= 2016 Baguio local elections =

15th Mayoral elections in Baguio

2016 Baguio mayoral election
← 2013	May 9, 2016	2019 →
- Turnout: 78.43%
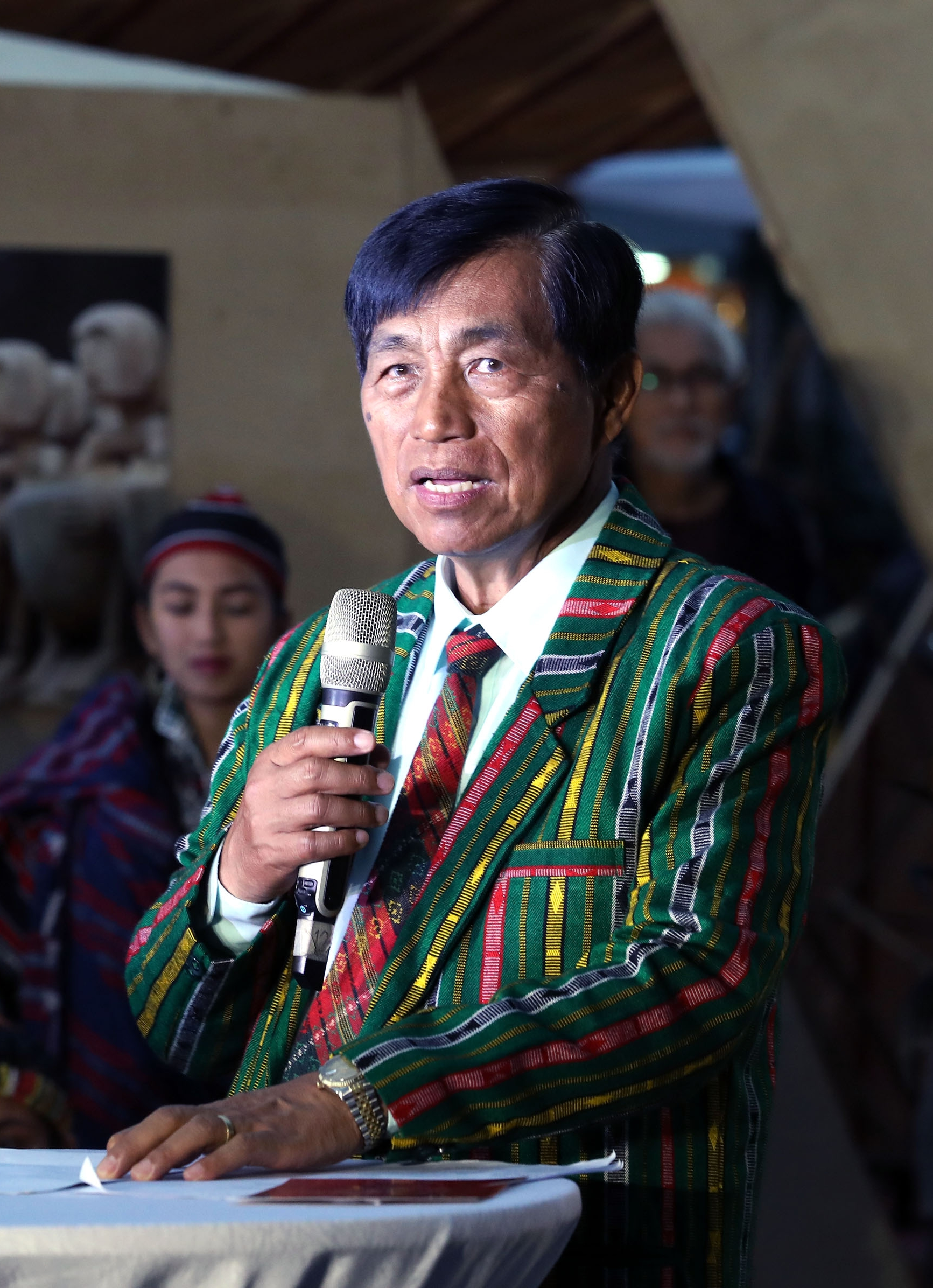

Nominee	Mauricio Domogan	Del Claravall	Jose Molintas
Party	UNA	Independent	NPC
Running mate	Betty Lourdes Tabanda	N/A	Edison Bilog
Popular vote	46,584	39,837	24,075
Percentage
Mayor before election
Mauricio Domogan
UNA
Elected mayor
Mauricio Domogan
UNA

Local elections were held in Baguio on Monday, May 9, 2016, as a part of the 2016 Philippine general election. Voters elected candidates for the local elective posts in the city: the mayor, vice mayor, the congressman, and the twelve councilors

Incumbent city mayor Mauricio Domogan ran and won the mayoralty seat for a third and final term in office. Incumbent vice mayor Edison Bilog also ran for a full term and won, after assuming the post following then-vice mayor Daniel Farinas' death.

== Mayoral and Vice Mayoral elections ==
=== Mayor ===
Incumbent mayor Mauricio Domogan is running for a third and final term.

Baguio mayoral election
Party	Candidate	Votes	%
UNA	Mauricio Domogan	46,584	41.92
Independent	Del Claravall	39,837	35.85
NPC	Jose Molintas	24,075	21.67
Independent	Guillermo Hernandez	627	.5
Valid ballots		111,123	95.85
Invalid or blank votes		4,806	4.15
Total votes		115,929	100.00
UNA hold			

=== Vice Mayor ===
Vice Mayor Edison Bilog is running for a full term as vice mayor, after assuming the post in 2014 following the death of then-vice mayor Daniel Farinas.

Baguio vice mayoral election
Party	Candidate	Votes	%
NPC	Edison Bilog	45,817	42.59
Liberal	Isabelo Cosalan Jr.	27,625	25.68
UNA	Betty Lourdes Tabanda	21,671	20.14
Independent	Fred Bagbagen	12,129	11.28
Independent	Jeffrey Pinic	325	.3
Valid ballots		107,567	92.77
Invalid or blank votes		8,362	7.21
Total votes		115,929	100.00
NPC hold			

== District representative ==
Incumbent Representative Nicasio Aliping Jr. is running for a second term. He was defeated by businessman Mark Go.

2016 Philippine House of Representatives election in the Lone District of Baguio
Party	Candidate	Votes	%
Nacionalista	Mark Go	45,482	41.28
Liberal	Nicasio Aliping Jr.	40,549	36.80
NPC	Bernardo Vergara	20,553	18.65
Independent	Rudy Aspilan	2,948	2.68
Independent	Edgardo Duque	647	.5
Valid ballots		110,179	95.04
Invalid or blank votes		5,750	4.96
Total votes		115,929	100.00
Nacionalista gain from Democratic Liberal			

== City Council ==
The 12 of 14 members of the Baguio City Council are elected at-large via multiple non-transferable vote, where each voter has 12 votes, and can vote up to 12 candidates. The 12 candidates with the highest number of votes are elected.

The other 2 members are elected in indirect elections from the results of barangay elections.

Party	Seats
Liberal Party	4
Nationalist People's Coalition	1
United Nationalist Alliance	6
Independent	1
Ex officio seats	2
Total	14

Here is a list of candidates

Baguio City Council Election
Party	Candidate	Votes	%
Liberal	Leandro Yangot Jr.	55,060	47.49
UNA	Edgar Avila	50,577	46.94
UNA	Roberto Ortega	54,349	46.88
Liberal	Joel Alangsab	53,141	45.84
NPC	Faustino Olowan	52,294	45.11
UNA	Elmer Datuin	49,491	42.69
Liberal	Maria Mylen Victoria Yaranon	48,387	41.74
UNA	Elaine Sembrano	47,161	40.68
Independent	Peter Fianza	43,937	37.90
UNA	Lilia Fariñas	41,676	35.95
Liberal	Arthur Allad-iw	41,046	35.41
UNA	Benny Bomogao	36,945	31.87
UNA	Erdolfo Balajadia	32,644	28.16
UNA	Bummy Bumanglag	31,392	27.08
Independent	Bong Mandapat	30,905	26.66
Liberal	Jojo Cabato	30,182	26.03
Liberal	Ronald Perez	29,803	25.71
Liberal	Jun Orca	29,094	25.10
UNA	Vladimir Cayabas	26,711	23.04
Independent	Ferdy Bayasen	25,294	21.82
Nacionalista	Grace Mayos	23,712	20.45
Liberal	Rudy Paraan	19,967	17.22
Independent	John Glenn Gaerlan	18,227	15.72
Independent	Jonathan Vergara	17,316	14.94
NPC	Gueliro Sugano	16,216	13.99
UNA	Marlene De Castro	14,422	12.44
UNA	Reenan Orate	13,365	11.53
Independent	Wida Ueda	12,807	11.05
Nacionalista	John Bagalawis	12,137	10.47
Independent	Benjamin Macadangdang	12,116	10.45
Nacionalista	Stanford Ang	11,620	10.02
NPC	Roberto Awingan	10,518	9.07
NPC	Carlos Ananayo	9,626	8.30
Independent	Derek Bautista	8,860	7.64
NPC	Nicanor Nialla	7,754	6.69
Independent	Connie Tongawan	5,662	4.88
Independent	Francis Padawil	5,634	4.86
Independent	Robin Coteng	5,168	4.46
Independent	Eddie Gapuz	4,590	3.96
Independent	Paul Batnag	4,542	3.92
Independent	Alan Antonio Mazo	4,116	3.55
Independent	Gerry Uy	3,696	3.19
Independent	Rose Abratique	3,679	3.17
Independent	Ed Apostol	3,136	2.71
Independent	Lalaine Estolas	2,783	2.40
NPC	Arturo Pajarillaga	1,290	1.11
Total votes		115,929	100.00
