= 2022 Baguio local elections =

17th Mayoral elections in Baguio

2022 Baguio mayoral election
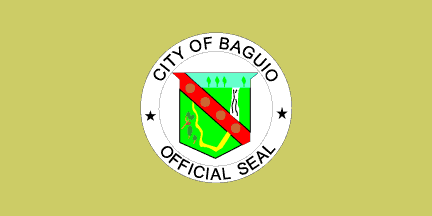
- May 9, 2022
- Registered: 168,218
- Turnout: 139,461 (82.9%) ▲13.51p.p.
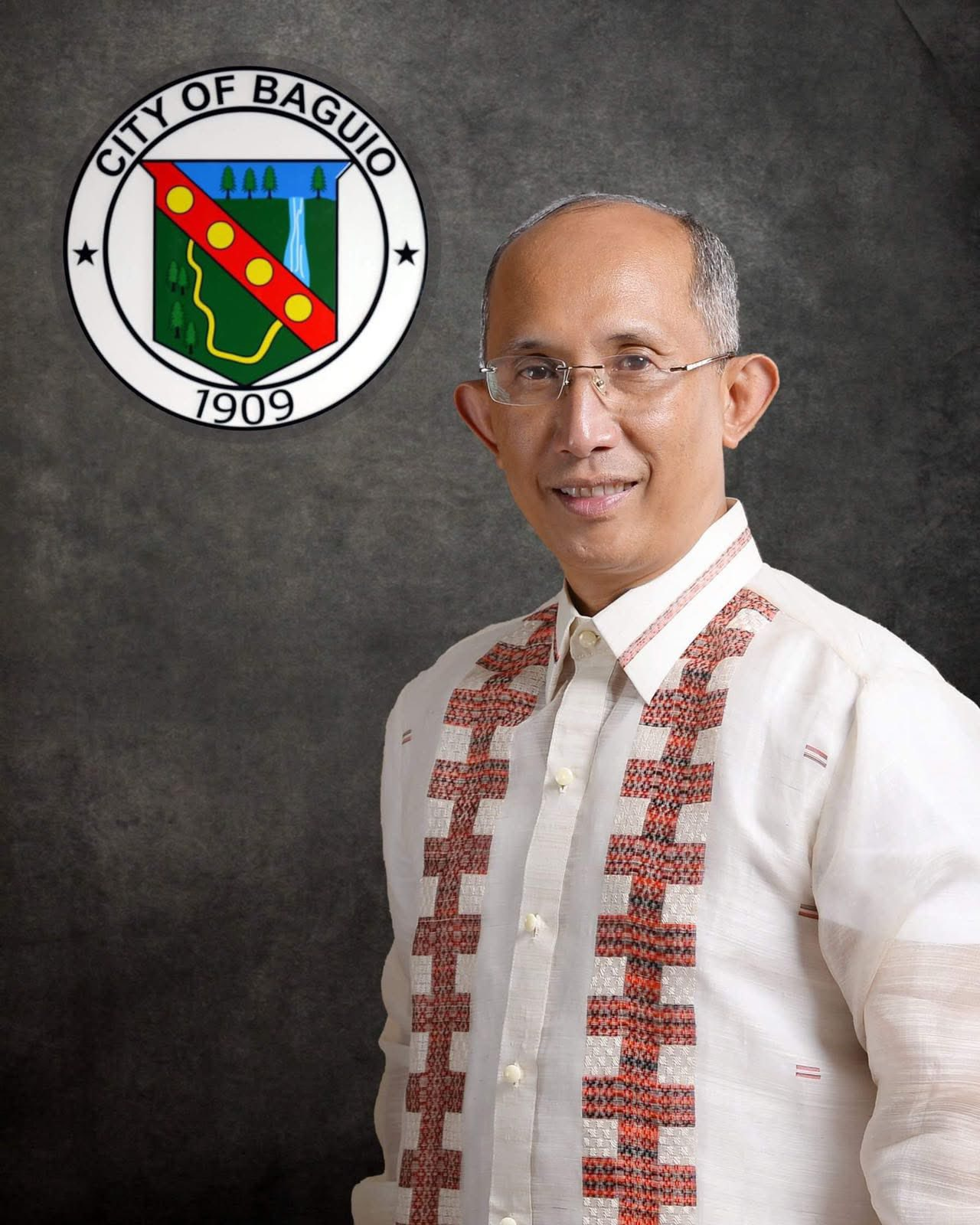

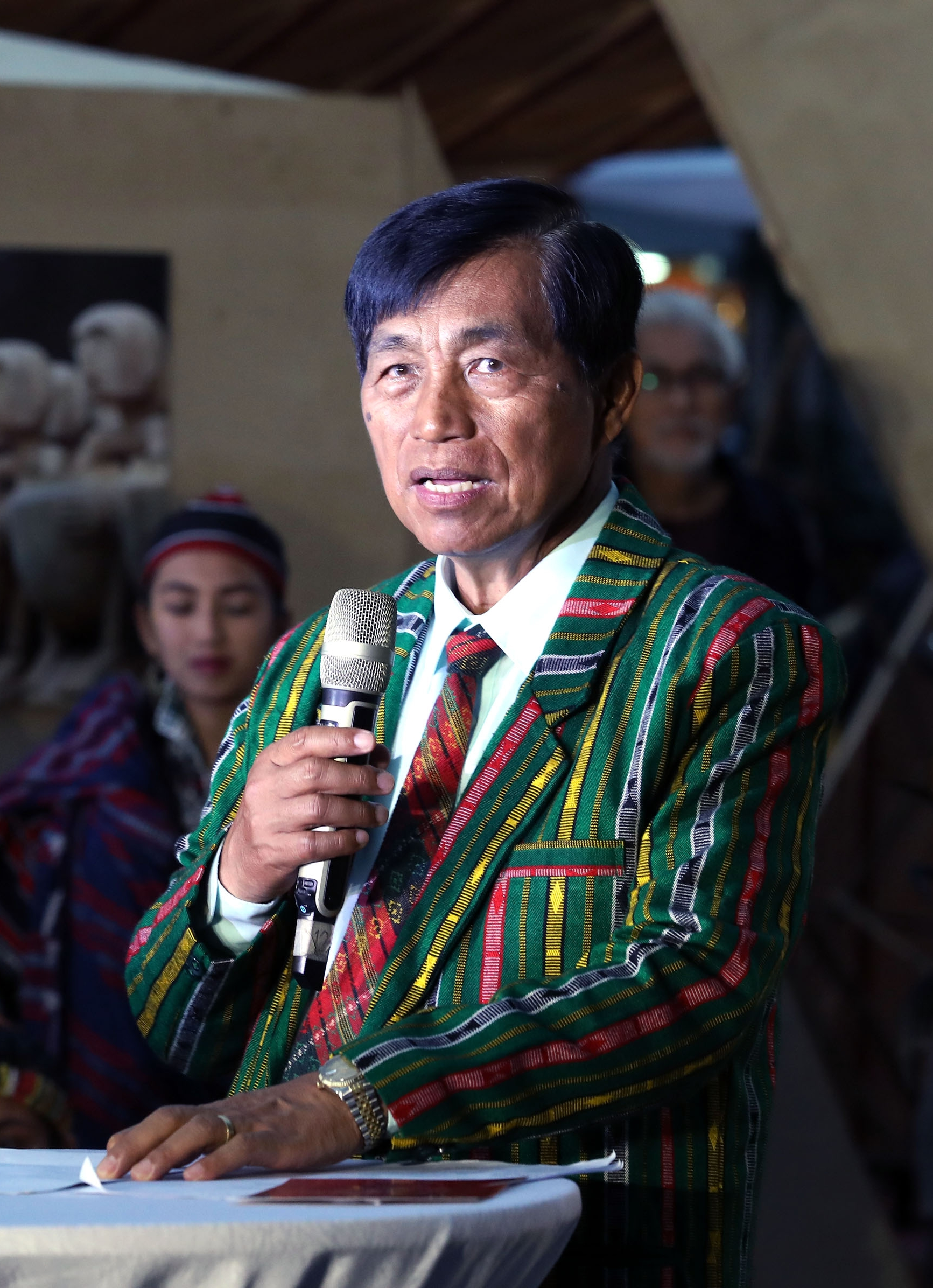

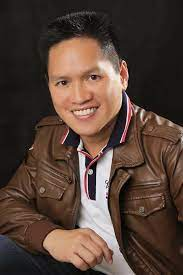
Nominee	Benjamin Magalong	Mauricio Domogan	Edison Bilog
Party	NPC	Lakas	PFP
Alliance	Team Magalong	Team Domogan	Team Bilog
Running mate	Faustino Olowan	Michael Lawana	Joel Alangsab
Popular vote	70,342	53,198	12,061
Percentage	51.75%	39.14%	8.87%
Mayor before election
Benjamin Magalong
NPC
Elected mayor
Benjamin Magalong
NPC
- Vice mayoral election
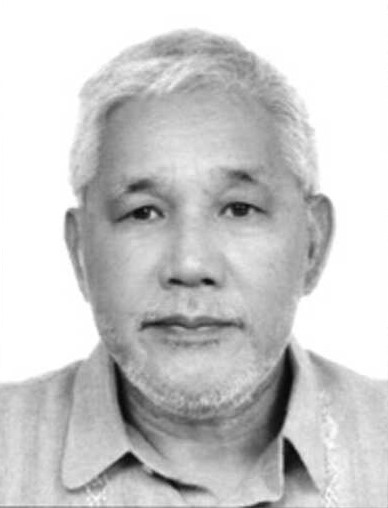
Candidate	Faustino Olowan	Michael Lawana
Party	Nacionalista	Independent
Alliance	Team Magalong	Team Domogan
Popular vote	65,897	27,177
Percentage	52.34%	21.58%
Vice Mayor before election
Faustino Olowan
Nacionalista
Elected Vice Mayor
Faustino Olowan
Nacionalista

Local elections were held in Baguio on Monday, May 9, 2022, as a part of the 2022 Philippine general election. Voters will elect candidates for the local elective posts in the city: the mayor, vice mayor, the congressman, and the twelve councilors.

Incumbent Mayor Benjamin Magalong won his re-election bid for the mayoralty race, beating former mayor Mauricio Domogan and former vice mayor Edison Bilog. Incumbent representative Mark Go, also won his bid for a third term. In the vice mayoral race, incumbent Vice Mayor Faustino Olowan also won his re-election bid, defeating incumbent Councilor and ABC President Michael Lawana, Councilor Joel Alangsab and Councilor Elaine Sembrano.

There were a total of 139,461 people who voted out of the 168,218 registered voters in the city.

== Background ==
Retired police general Benjamin Magalong won the mayoralty race in 2019, and is seeking re-election for a second term in office. Former mayor Mauricio Domogan, who ran for representative and lost to incumbent representative Mark Go, is seeking a political comeback and is running again for mayor.

During the onslaught of the COVID-19 pandemic, Magalong's government was highly praised for its efforts to contain the virus, and was even cited as a model city by the national government. Cities and municipalities around the country invited Magalong where he would share his government's best practices and case analysis approach towards combating the pandemic. In July 2020, President Duterte appointed Magalong as the country's contract tracing czar, tasked with training and intensifying the skillset of contact tracers as well as improve contract tracing systems in the county.

=== Electoral System ===
Local elections are held every three years, on the second Monday of May coinciding with the elections for the national positions. An individual may only be elected to an office for a maximum of three consecutive terms.

==== Mayoral and Vice Mayoral Elections ====
The first-past-the-post voting system is used to determine the mayor wherein the candidate with the most votes, whether or not one has a majority, wins the mayoralty.

The vice mayoral election is held separately but does observe the same rules. Voters are given the option to vote for candidates from different parties.

==== House of Representatives Elections ====
The city is a lone district and elects a representative through the first-past-the-post voting system wherein the candidate with the most votes, whether or not one has a majority, wins the seat.

==== City Council Elections ====
In the City Council, the city is represented by 12 councilors elected every three years. The twelve candidates with the most votes will be elected.

== Retiring and term-limited incumbents ==
=== City Councilors ===
- Joel Alangsab - running for Vice Mayor
- Elaine Sembrano - running for Vice Mayor
- Francisco Roberto Ortega VI - not term limited but not running for re-election

== Tickets ==
As the mayor, vice mayor and the members of the city council are elected on the same ballot, mayoral candidates may present or endorse a slate of city council candidates. These slates usually run with their respective mayoral and vice mayoral candidates along with the other members of their slate. A group of candidates independent of any mayoral or vice mayoral candidate may also form a slate consisting of themselves.

=== Administration coalition ===
Team Magalong
#	Name	Party
For Mayor
3.	Benjamin Magalong	NPC
For Vice Mayor
3.	Faustino Olowan	Nacionalista
For Councilor
3.	Arthur Allad-iw	Liberal
5.	Fred Bagbagen	Independent
9.	Pam Cariño	NPC
11.	Isabelo Cosalan Jr.	Liberal
13.	Marlene De Castro	NPC
16.	Lilia Fariñas	NPC
18.	Peter Fianza	Independent
22.	Vic Jimenez	Liberal
26.	Jose Molintas	Liberal
33.	Cricket Villareal	NPC
34.	Phillian Allan Weygan	Nacionalista

=== Primary opposition coalition ===
Team Domogan
#	Name	Party
For Mayor
2.	Mauricio Domogan	Lakas
For Vice Mayor
2.	Michael Lawana	Independent
For Councilor
7.	Benny Bomogao	Lakas
10.	Vladimir Cayabas	Independent
12.	Elmer Datuin	PFP
21.	Michael Humiding	PFP
24.	Ryan Mangusan	Lakas
25.	Murphy Maspil Sr.	Independent
28.	Levy Lloyd Orcales	PRP
29.	Emelyn Ortega	Lakas
32.	Betty Lourdes Tabanda	Nacionalista
35.	Leando Yangot Jr.	Nacionalista
36.	Maria Mylen Victoria Yaranon	Liberal

=== Secondary opposition coalition ===
Team Bilog
#	Name	Party
For Mayor
1.	Edison Bilog	PFP
For Vice Mayor
1.	Joel Alangsab	Independent
For Councilor
8.	Marica Carantes	PFP
14.	Mario Delos Reyes	Independent
17.	Rico John Ferrer	PFP
23.	Noel Mabutas	PFP
31.	Raymund Ruaro	PFP

=== Other tickets ===
Team GO Baguio
#	Name	Party
For House Of Representatives
2.	Mark Go	Nacionalista
For Vice Mayor
3.	Faustino Olowan	Nacionalista
For Councilor
19.	Glenn Gaerlan	Nacionalista
28.	Levy Lloyd Orcales	PRP
32.	Betty Lourdes Tabanda	Nacionalista
34.	Phillian Allan Weygan	Nacionalista
35.	Leando Yangot Jr.	Nacionalista

Team TRoPa Baguio
#	Name	Party
For Councilor
3.	Arthur Allad-iw	Liberal
11.	Isabelo Cosalan Jr.	Liberal
22.	Vic Jimenez	Liberal
26.	Jose Molintas	Liberal
36.	Maria Mylen Victoria Yaranon	Liberal

=== Non-independents not in Tickets ===
#	Name	Party
For House of Representatives
6.	Rafael Wasan	PDDS
For Councilor
2.	Regino Alambra	PDSP
19.	Richard Dollente	PFP

=== Independents not in tickets ===
#	Name	Party
For Vice Mayor
4.	Elaine Sembrano	Independent
For House of Representatives
1.	Alexis Abano	Independent
2.	Nicasio Aliping Jr.	Independent
3.	Reynaldo Diaz Jr.	Independent
4.	Edgardo Duque	Independent
For Councilor
1.	Gary Paul Abela	Independent
4.	Alfonso Aviles	Independent
6.	Pablo Batnag	Independent
20.	Eddie Gapuz	Independent
27.	Gordon Monserrate	Independent
30.	Mariano Perez III	Independent

== Mayoral election ==
Incumbent mayor Benjamin Magalong was elected in 2019 and is running for a second term.

=== Candidates ===
1. Edison Bilog, Vice Mayor of Baguio (2014-2019), Councilor (2010-2014)
2. Mauricio Domogan, Representative of Baguio (2001-2010), Mayor of Baguio (1992-2001;2010-2019), Vice Mayor of Baguio (1992), Councilor (1988-1992)
3. Benjamin Magalong, Mayor of Baguio (2019–present)
4. Jeffrey Pinic

=== Results ===
Baguio mayoral election
Party	Candidate	Votes	%
NPC	Benjamin Magalong	70,342	51.75
Lakas	Mauricio Domogan	53,198	39.14
PFP	Edison Bilog	12,061	8.87
Independent	Jeffrey Pinic	333	0.24
Valid ballots		135,934	97.47
Invalid or blank votes		3,527	2.53
Total votes		139,461	100
NPC hold			

== Vice mayoral election ==
Incumbent vice mayor Faustino Olowan is running for re-election.

=== Candidates ===
1. Joel Alangsab, Councilor (2013–present), ABC President (ex officio Councilor) (2008-2013)
2. Michael Lawana, ABC President (ex officio Councilor) (2016–present)
3. Faustino Olowan, Vice Mayor of Baguio (2019–present), Councilor (2013-2019)
4. Elaine Sembrano, Councilor (2001-2010; 2013–present)

=== Results ===
Baguio vice mayoral election
Party	Candidate	Votes	%
Nacionalista	Faustino Olowan	65,897	52.34
Independent	Michael Lawana	27,177	21.58
Independent	Joel Alangsab	19,465	15.46
Independent	Elaine Sembrano	13,368	10.62
Valid ballots		125,907	90.28
Invalid or blank votes		13,554	9.72
Total votes		139,461	100
Nacionalista hold			

== Congressional election ==
Incumbent Representative Mark Go is running for a third term.

=== Candidates ===
1. Alexis Abano
2. Nicasio Aliping Jr., Representative of Baguio (2013-2016)
3. Reynaldo Diaz Jr.
4. Edgardo Duque
5. Mark Go, Representative of Baguio (2016–present)
6. Rafael Wasan

=== Results ===
2022 Philippine House of Representatives election in Lone District of Baguio
Party	Candidate	Votes	%
Nacionalista	Mark Go	99,372	75.11
Independent	Nicasio Aliping Jr.	30,156	22.79
Independent	Edgardo Duque	982	0.74
PDDS	Rafael Wasan	729	0.55
Independent	Reynaldo Diaz Jr.	689	0.52
Independent	Alexis Abano	375	0.28
Valid ballots		132,303	94.87
Invalid or blank votes		7,158	5.13
Total votes		139,461	100
Nacionalista hold			

== City Council election ==
The 12 of 14 members of the Baguio City Council are elected at-large via multiple non-transferable vote, where each voter has 12 votes, and can vote up to 12 candidates. The 12 candidates with the highest number of votes are elected.

The other 2 members are elected in indirect elections from the results of barangay elections.

Party	Votes	%	Seats
Liberal Party	285,599	23.04	4
Nacionalista Party	217,642	17.56	2
Lakas-CMD	173,889	14.03	1
Nationalist People's Coalition	139,057	11.22	1
Partido Federal ng Pilipinas	138,688	11.19	1
People's Reform Party	29,473	2.38	0
Partido Demokratiko Sosyalista ng Pilipinas	5,086	0.41	0
Independent	250,277	20.19	3
Ex officio seats			2
Total	1,239,711	100.00	14

=== Results ===
Baguio City Council Election
Party	Candidate	Votes	%
Lakas	Benny Bomogao	71,441	51.23
Liberal	Jose Molintas	69,862	50.09
Liberal	Arthur Allad-iw	68,923	49.42
Nacionalista	Betty Lourdes Tabanda	67,108	48.12
Nacionalista	Leandro Yangot Jr.	66,130	47.42
Liberal	Isabelo Cosalan Jr.	65,398	46.89
Liberal	Maria Mylen Victoria Yaranon	62,408	44.75
PFP	Elmer Datuin	60,844	43.63
Independent	Peter Fianza	60,283	43.23
Independent	Vladimir Cayabas	58,783	42.15
Independent	Fred Bagbagen	58,300	41.80
NPC	Lilia Fariñas	58,145	41.69
Lakas	Emelyn Ortega	54,223	38.88
Lakas	Ryan Mangusan	48,225	34.58
Nacionalista	Philian Louise Weygan Allan	45,275	32.46
Nacionalista	John Glenn Gaerlan	35,234	25.26
NPC	Angeline Pamela Cariño	34,860	25.00
PRP	Levy Lloyd Orcales	29,473	21.13
PFP	Michael Humiding	24,485	17.56
NPC	Marlene de Castro	23,959	17.18
NPC	Chrisitan Villareal	22,093	15.84
Liberal	Vic Jimenez	19,008	13.63
Independent	Murphy Maspil Sr.	17,865	12.81
PFP	Marica Carantes	17,667	12.67
Independent	Mario Delos Reyes	14,797	10.61
PFP	Rico John Ferrer	12,946	8.96
PFP	Noel Mabutas	10,911	7.82
Independent	Gary Paul Abela	9,497	6.81
Independent	Mariano Perez III	9,063	6.50
Independent	Edilberto Gapuz	8,632	6.19
Independent	Pablo Batnag	7,720	5.54
PFP	Richard Dollente	5,981	4.29
PFP	Raymund Ruaro	5,854	4.20
Independent	Alfonso Aviles	5,337	3.83
PDSP	Regino Alambra	5,086	3.65
Independent	Gordon Monserrate	3,895	2.79
Total votes		1,239,711	100
