= 2010 Philippine House of Representatives elections in the Cordillera Administrative Region =

Philippine House of Representatives elections in the Cordillera Administrative Region, 2010
- May 10, 2010

7 seats of the Cordillera Administrative Region in the House of Representatives
	First party	Second party	Third party
Party	Lakas–Kampi	Liberal	PDSP
Seats won	4	2	1
Popular vote	231,616	111,454	46,536
Percentage	35.49%	17.08%	7.13%
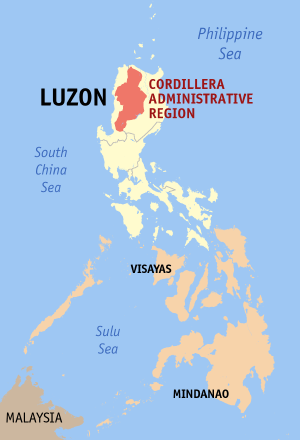
- Location of the Cordillera Administrative Region within the country.

Elections were held in Cordillera Administrative Region for seats in the House of Representatives of the Philippines on May 10, 2010.

The candidate with the most votes won that district's seat for the 15th Congress of the Philippines.

== Summary ==
Party	Popular vote	%	Seats won
Lakas–Kampi	231,616	35.49%	4
Liberal	111,454	17.08%	2
Nacionalista	84,957	13.02%	0
PDSP	46,536	7.13%	1
PDP–Laban	34,707	5.32%	0
PMP	29,252	4.48%	0
Aksyon	18,792	2.88%	0
NPC	10,606	1.63%	0
LDP	9,774	1.50%	0
KBL	5,598	0.86%	0
Independent	69,292	10.62%	0
Valid votes	652,584	95.70%	7
Invalid votes	29,333	4.30%	
Turnout	681,917	75.35%	
Registered voters	909,944	100.00%	

== Abra ==
In the province of Abra, once an election hot spot, governor Eustaquio Bersamin has called on candidates to strictly adhere to the manifesto they signed and respect the rule of law. Incumbent representative Cecilia Seares-Luna has three opponents: Ma. Zita Valera, the wife of detained former Gov. Vicente Valera; Joy Bernos-Valera, Bangued mayor Dominic Valera's daughter, and former ranking official of the Cordillera People's Liberation Army (CPLA) Mailed Molina. Abra police managed to facilitate an "agreement" in which politicians will not field candidates against one another, although it was not followed as politicians started to jockey for positions.

As a result of the tension in the province, the Commission on Elections has placed the province under its watch list.

The result of the election is under protest in the House of Representatives Electoral Tribunal.

Candidate	Party	Votes	%
Joy Bernos	Partido Demokratiko Sosyalista ng Pilipinas	46,536	40.85
Cecilia Seares-Luna (incumbent)	Lakas–Kampi–CMD	45,454	39.90
Ma. Zita Valera	Nacionalista Party	11,249	9.87
Mailed Molina	Pwersa ng Masang Pilipino	10,677	9.37
Total		113,916	100.00
Valid votes		113,916	95.21
Invalid/blank votes		5,735	4.79
Total votes		119,651	100.00
Partido Demokratiko Sosyalista ng Pilipinas gain from Lakas–Kampi–CMD			
Source: Commission on Elections

== Apayao ==
Incumbent Elias Bulut, Jr. is on his third consecutive term already and is ineligible for election. He will run for the provincial governorship and his fellow Bulut family member Eleanor Begtang will run as his party's nominee.

Candidate	Party	Votes	%
Eleanor Begtang	Lakas–Kampi–CMD	37,006	86.86
Amado Almazan	Kilusang Bagong Lipunan	5,598	13.14
Total		42,604	100.00
Valid votes		42,604	89.95
Invalid/blank votes		4,758	10.05
Total votes		47,362	100.00
Lakas–Kampi–CMD hold			
Source: Psephos

== Baguio ==
Incumbent Mauricio Domogan of Lakas-Kampi-CMD is in his third consecutive term and thus ineligible for reelection. Former Baguio mayor and Nationalist People's Coalition regional chair Bernardo Vergara is the party's nominee for the city's Congressional seat, although Vergara is also nominated by Lakas-Kampi-CMD.

Candidate	Party	Votes	%
Bernardo Vergara	Lakas–Kampi–CMD	27,020	25.88
Rocky Thomas Balisong	Nacionalista Party	17,965	17.21
Leandro Yangot Jr.	Liberal Party	16,639	15.94
Edgar Avila	Pwersa ng Masang Pilipino	15,395	14.75
Reinaldo Bautista Jr.	Independent	12,833	12.29
Braulio Yaranon	Laban ng Demokratikong Pilipino	9,774	9.36
Rabinrandranah Quilala	PDP–Laban	3,819	3.66
Dwight Nicolas Bello III	Independent	793	0.76
Felipe Ramos	Independent	155	0.15
Total		104,393	100.00
Valid votes		104,393	96.65
Invalid/blank votes		3,618	3.35
Total votes		108,011	100.00
Lakas–Kampi–CMD hold			
Source: Commission on Elections

== Benguet ==
Incumbent Samuel Dangwa is on his third consecutive term already and is ineligible for election. He will run for the provincial governorship.

Candidate	Party	Votes	%
Ronald Cosalan	Liberal Party	48,732	33.37
Jack Dulnuan	Nacionalista Party	37,992	26.02
Liso Agpas	PDP–Laban	30,888	21.15
Mario Godio	Lakas–Kampi–CMD	20,075	13.75
Ricardo Angluben	Independent	6,178	4.23
Thomas Chamos	Independent	1,945	1.33
Bedis Guznian	Independent	210	0.14
Total		146,020	100.00
Valid votes		146,020	94.48
Invalid/blank votes		8,529	5.52
Total votes		154,549	100.00
Liberal Party gain from Lakas–Kampi–CMD			
Source: Commission on Elections

== Ifugao ==
Incumbent Solomon Chungalao of Lakas Kampi CMD is in his third consecutive term already and is barred from seeking reelection; he is running for the provincial governorship as his party nominated Nelson Allaga in his place.

Candidate	Party	Votes	%
Teddy Baguilat	Liberal Party	22,314	28.88
Denis Habawel	Nacionalista Party	17,751	22.97
Jonathan Cuyahon	Independent	13,250	17.15
Justinian Licnachan	Nationalist People's Coalition	10,606	13.73
Nelson Allaga	Lakas–Kampi–CMD	6,082	7.87
Albert Pawingi	Independent	4,090	5.29
Placido Wachayna Jr.	Pwersa ng Masang Pilipino	3,180	4.12
Total		77,273	100.00
Valid votes		77,273	96.65
Invalid/blank votes		2,681	3.35
Total votes		79,954	100.00
Liberal Party gain from Lakas–Kampi–CMD			
Source: Commission on Elections

== Kalinga ==
Candidate	Party	Votes	%
Manuel Agyao (incumbent)	Lakas–Kampi–CMD	71,255	74.99
James Bejarin	Liberal Party	23,769	25.01
Total		95,024	100.00
Valid votes		95,024	97.36
Invalid/blank votes		2,575	2.64
Total votes		97,599	100.00
Lakas–Kampi–CMD hold			
Source: Commission on Elections

== Mountain Province ==
Incumbent Victor Dominguez (KAMPI) died on February 8, 2008. Incumbent governor Maximo Dalog is in his third consecutive term and is ineligible for election, and is instead running for Congress under Lakas Kampi CMD, the successor party of KAMPI.

The result of the election is under protest in the House of Representatives Electoral Tribunal.

Candidate	Party	Votes	%
Maximo Dalog	Lakas–Kampi–CMD	24,724	33.71
Jupiter Dominguez	Nacionalista Party	23,973	32.68
Franklin Odsey	Aksyon Demokratiko	18,792	25.62
Thomas Perry Killip	Independent	5,865	8.00
Total		73,354	100.00
Valid votes		73,354	98.08
Invalid/blank votes		1,437	1.92
Total votes		74,791	100.00
Lakas–Kampi–CMD hold			
Source: ibanangayon.ph
