= Baguio anti-profanity ordinance =

Local legislation in the Philippines

Baguio City Council
- Citation: Ordinance No. 550
- Territorial extent: Baguio
- Signed by: Mayor Mauricio Domogan
- Signed: September 24, 2018

Amended by
- Ordinance No. 118 S-2018
- Status: In force

The Baguio anti-profanity ordinance is an ordinance enacted by the Baguio City Council discouraging the act of expressing profanities in certain public spaces in Baguio.

== Legislative history ==
The anti-profanity ordinance in Baguio was first proposed by city councilor Lilia A. Fariñas. The ordinance passed on the first reading on January 16, 2017. The ordinance was signed into law by Mayor Mauricio Domogan on September 24, 2018.

== Ordinance ==
External video
- Anti-profanity ordinance sa Baguio, mabisa nga ba? (lit. 'Is the anti-profanity ordinance in Baguio effective?') from GMA Public Affairs (in Filipino)

The ordinance is in force on public places frequented by the students up to the college level. This includes all schools, computer shops, arcades and other places frequented by the youth.

Profanity under the local law is "blasphemous or obscene language, regular or irreverent speech or action, expletives, oath, swearing, cussing, profane, or obscene expressions, usually of surprise or anger". It does not take into account the context, on why profanity is uttered.

While the ordinance has no provisions to impose criminal liabilities to violators. It explicitly does provide for administrative sanctions for violations committed inside schools. The most serious sanction is expulsion of an erring student under the prerogative of the school.

Teachers and guidance counselors are encouraged to summon parents of erring students to tackle about the matter.

Establishments are encouraged to put up signages about the ordinance as well.

== Reception ==
According to Salvador Panelo, the ordinance if challenged legally will likely be deemed unconstitutional since it is at odds against freedom of speech. He insist that profanities should be okay if its not meant to injure another person and is merely meant as an impression.

Georaloy Palao-a, a public affairs officer in the Department of Education (DepEd) Cordillera office, lauded the ordinance saying it will strengthen the educational body's existing policy to discourage swearing among the youth.
