= 1988 Philippine local elections =

1988 Philippine local election
- January 18, 1988

Elections for a new set of provincial and local city and municipal officials were held in the Philippines on January 18, 1988 under the new Constitution of the Philippines which was ratified in 1987.

== Background ==
The local elections of January 18, 1988, were the third nationwide electoral exercise held under the presidency of Corazon Aquino. In February 1987, a new constitution was ratified in a plebiscite. In May, an election for a new congress was held, which was dominated by allies of the president. Barangay elections were held in 1989. On the other hand, these were also the first since 1980, the only such elections during the nationwide martial law under the presidency of Ferdinand Marcos.

After Marcos was ousted in the 1986 People Power Revolution, public offices were subjected to the reforms under the "Freedom Constitution" in the Aquino administration's effort to weaken the political machine of Marcos' political party Kilusang Bagong Lipunan (KBL) and his allies in the country. A two-year political process began with Proclamation No. 3, issued by Aquino on March 25 which, among other orders, effectively abolishing all elective positions nationwide; all elected local government officials were removed, particularly (or most of) those affiliated either with the Marcoses or with the KBL. The Ministry of Local Government, through an executive order, later appointed Officers-in-Charge to take over local government offices. This caused yet little opposition, mainly by vice president Salvador Laurel, and confusion among these units. Moreover, the local government's failure to deliver goods and services only resulted to the continued communist insurgency.

Meanwhile, local elections were originally set in May but were delayed twice, first for a year pending the constitutional plebiscite. Aquino said that the elections would "complete the cycle" of restoration of democracy in the country.

== Pre-election events ==
The 45-day campaign period started on December 1, 1987. Between 150,000 and 160,000 candidates sought for 15,946 local positions, (Note: The Commission on Elections (COMELEC) initially estimated the total number of positions at stake "probably" between 14,000 and 16,000. The Los Angeles Times placed this at 16,454.) which included 73 provincial governors and 1,564 city and town mayors. Continued rivalry and popularity were much observed, rather than issues to be raised.

The administration's "people power" coalition, in an effort to control over regions controlled either by the radical left or right, had political alliances with candidates philosophically opposed to the president. It was observed that politicians, belonged to many former Marcos kingpins and some right-wing warlords with loyalty issues and mostly removed by Aquino, were among those endorsed either by the administration or by one of its coalition's parties, over candidates who had been pro-Aquino. Such decision subjected the president to criticism; and was charged by critics as simply returning to the pre-martial law local dynastic politics. On the other hand, the family backed some new candidates in several regions. As a result, almost all candidates claimed themselves pro-Aquino, while some of the president's critics ran as independents. Aquino personally endorsed only few candidates and limited her campaigning mainly to Metro Manila. Various political parties openly supported candidates, either independents or from another party.

President Aquino appealed for an end to the violence and for "peaceful and honest elections." Manila Archbishop Cardinal Jaime Sin and the Makati Business Club joined such calls. On the other hand, Vice President Laurel called for a postponement of elections in areas with strong influence by the communist rebels.

The Commission on Elections (COMELEC) declared more than a third of 103,000 precincts "hot spots;" same declaration by the military on at least 930 areas where violence is possible. The COMELEC took over direct supervision of the polls in 30 identified areas; and postponed the elections in eleven of the 73 provinces until February 15 due to security reasons to give way for the implementation of special measures against fraud and violence. Election officials placed cadets, college students in the Reserve Officers' Training Corps and local officers of Jaycees as official poll monitors.

Areas where elections were suspended
New dates	Local entities
Jan. 25	Abra; Quezon; Ilocos Sur; Ifugao; Maguindanao (including Cotabato City)
Feb. 1	Lanao del Sur; Lanao del Norte; Northern Samar; Leyte
Feb. 8	Tawi-Tawi; Santa Ana, Pampanga
Feb. 15	Sulu

All security forces were placed on the alert, particularly to potential trouble areas. The Armed Forces of the Philippines (AFP) deployed all 159,000 combat troops and 65,000 police personnel. On the eve of the elections, its chief of staff Gen. Fidel V. Ramos ordered all regional commanders on maximum alert following intelligence reports on plans by renegade, right-wing military squads to disrupt the elections.

== Election day ==
Elections first proceeded in 62 provinces on January 18. In general, there were 27 million eligible voters; the voter turnout was 80%.

Unlike previous elections, no independent poll-watcher groups performed "quick counts"; final results would be made available until two days later as many precincts were situated in remote areas.

=== Candidates ===
Early, unofficial returns showed some candidates endorsed by the administration or her coalition leading in key positions; but same to several veteran politicians particularly in Metro Manila and the provinces. The elections reportedly reinforced traditional and patronage politics. Popular candidates were elected in the urban areas; voters in the rural areas supported their relatives and friends. "Show business" candidates emerged likewise.

In northern Luzon where former president Marcos was still being supported, pro-Marcos candidates were elected particularly in three provinces and in Baguio.

Meanwhile, among those president's relatives, in Quezon City, Mila Aquino–Albert, her sister-in-law, placed third behind two veteran politicians, one being accused of graft. In Rizal, Vic Sumulong, her nephew, lost in the gubernatorial race; while her two other cousins were leading in mayoral races.

Candidates from the dynasties lost in Pampanga, Iloilo and Agusan del Sur; but won in Negros Occidental and Cebu City.

==== Elected candidates by political party ====
In preparation for the 1992 elections, pro-administration politicians led by House Speaker Ramon Mitra Jr. initiated the merger of all supporting political parties into a single party. For this elections, an alliance was forged between PDP–Laban and Lakas ng Bansa (LnB), then headed by president's brother Representative Jose Cojuangco and president's brother-in-law Paul Aquino, respectively. A common slate was fielded in 53 of 73 provinces, including politicians formerly affiliated with the KBL.

By January 23, the LnB reported securing 42 gubernatorial seats and 41 city mayoral seats. On the other hand, the Liberal Party, while securing 6 gubernatorial and 7 mayoral victories, claimed that they would win 20 of 25 gubernatorial seats, aside from what they said were "secret bets" who joined the administration coalition. Independent candidates reportedly won in 15 provinces and 17 cities.

Breakdown of winning candidates per party
Party		No. and % of seats	
Pro-administration	Lakas ng Bansa	2,134	13.38%
Pro-administration	PDP–Laban	2,959	18.56%
Pro-administration	Liberal	1,259	7.9%
Pro-administration	UNIDO	591	3.71%
Pro-administration	Coalitions	2,634	16.52%
Pro-administration	Unknown	53	0.33%
Pro-administration	Total	9,630	60.39%
Opposition	Nacionalista	583	3.66%
Opposition	KBL	151	0.95%
Opposition	GAD	1	0.01%
Opposition	Partido ng Bayan	17	0.11%
Opposition	Coalitions	309	1.94%
Opposition	Total	1,061	6.65%
Independents or regional/local parties		5,255	32.95%
Total		15,946	100%
SOURCE: COMELEC

Among those elected candidates, three-fifths were from pro-administration parties, while only almost 7% were from the opposition.

==== Partial list of elected governors and vice governors ====
- In Ilocos Norte, Marcos' home province, his loyalists were leading the races in key positions. Rodolfo Fariñas, former Laoag mayor, led the governorship by a wide margin over Manuela Ablan, who was endorsed by the president. On the other hand, Rolando Abadilla, former head of Marcos' intelligence service, was endorsed by the ruling party and was later elected vice governor. He had been detained since July 1987 for his involvement in at least three coup attempts; from Fort Bonifacio, he was flown to Laoag to vote.
- Gonzalo Duque (LP), vice governor of Pangasinan
- Former Lt. Col. Rodolfo Aguinaldo, who had left the Philippine Constabulary and had been dismissed from the army after taking part in the serious August 1987 coup attempt, was elected governor of Cagayan.
- Pro-Marcos candidate Orlando Dulay, detained since 1987 for being the alleged mastermind of the murder of three pro-Aquino campaign workers during the 1986 election, was elected governor of Quirino.
- Faustino Dy (PDP–LnB), governor of Isabela
- Leonardo Roman (PDP–LnB), governor of Bataan
- Roberto Pagdanganan (PDP–LnB), governor of Bulacan
- Marciano Ocampo (PDP–LnB), governor of Tarlac
- Amor Deloso (PDP–LnB), governor of Zambales
- Vicente Mayo (PDP–LnB), governor of Batangas; defeating Benjie Laurel, nephew of vice president Laurel
- Felicisimo San Luis (PDP–LnB), governor of Laguna
- Rey San Juan (LP), governor of Rizal
- Romeo Salalima (LP), governor of Albay
- Roy Padilla Jr. (PDP–LnB), governor of Camarines Norte
- Luis Villafuerte (PDP–LnB), governor of Camarines Sur
- Simplicio Griño (PDP–LnB, LP), governor of Iloilo
- Daniel Lacson (PDP–LnB), governor of Negros Occidental
- Ben Aquino (PDP–LnB), governor of Siquijor
- Lutgardo Barbo (LP), governor of Eastern Samar
- In Leyte, Adelina Larrazabal (PDP–LnB), governor; Leopoldo Petilla, vice governor (Note: Leyte: The proclamation of Adelina Larrazabal as provincial governor by the Commission on Elections (COMELEC) was prevented by the Supreme Court on February 4. In 1991, the COMELEC disqualified Larrazabal; and later disallowed the proclamation of her opponent, Benjamin Abella (LP). Provincial vice-governor Leopoldo Petilla assumed the governorship for almost the entire term.)
- Oscar Tan (PDP–LnB), governor of Southern Leyte
- Gerry Salapuddin, former Moro National Liberation Front guerrilla, governor of Basilan
- Douglas Cagas (PDP–LnB), governor of Davao del Sur
- Leopoldo Lopez (PDP–LnB), governor of Davao Oriental
- Nestor Gumana (LP), governor of Sultan Kudarat

==== Partial list of elected municipal and city officials ====
- Prospero Oreta (PDP–LnB), mayor of Malabon
- Benjamin Abalos (PDP–LnB), former OIC, mayor of Mandaluyong
- Felipe del Rosario (PDP–LnB), mayor of Navotas
- In Manila, administration mayoral candidate Gemiliano Lopez was leading.
- Television comedian Tito Sotto, vice mayor of Quezon City
- Abe King and Philip Cezar, professional basketball players for the Great Taste Coffee team, won seats on the councils of Pasay and San Juan, respectively.
- Jun Labo, popular faith healer, mayor of Baguio
- Liberato Reyna (PDP–LnB), mayor of Dagupan
- Felixberto Olivares Sr. (PDP–LnB), mayor of Puerto Princesa
- Pablo Magtajas (PDP–LnB), mayor of Cagayan de Oro
- Manuel Torres (PDP–LnB), mayor of Bago
- Juancho Torre (PDP–LnB), mayor of La Carlota
- Benjamin Arao, mayor of Pagadian (Note: Pagadian: Warlito Pulmones filed an election protest after the proclamation of Benjamin Arao, alleging fraud and irregularities. After examination of ballots, on January 23, 1992, the COMELEC declared Pulmones the winner.)
- Percival Catane (PDP–LnB), mayor of Oroquieta
- Arturo Lugod (PDP–LnB), mayor of Gingoog

=== Related incidents ===
The six-week campaign and the elections were both marred by violence, mainly caused by political rivalries. Nevertheless, election officials said that both were peaceful. The campaign was described by The Philippine Star publisher Max Soliven in his column as "a survival course" with "the candidate still alive [until the counting of ballots be the] most likely to win."

In the entire campaign period, at least 87, including 39 candidates, were killed; 52 were left wounded; and by January 14, there were 24 candidates kidnapped; 15 of them were freed. At least a candidate committed suicide. The incidents were mostly blamed by the military on the New People's Army (NPA), which presumably perpetrated the kidnappings; but observers said some or most may be political killings done by private armies and hired assassins. However, the military stressed that the toll was fewer than those of the previous elections since under Marcos leadership. (Note: According to the Armed Forces of the Philippines, there were 97 election-related deaths in total. Another source reported 93. Comparison to prior elections is shown: In 1971: 905 (AFP) — in local elections, 155 during a four-month campaign; 49 on election day.; 1980 local elections: 130 (AFP); 1984 parliamentary elections: 154 (AFP); 1986 presidential election: 95 to 141 (AFP); 1987 legislative elections: 50 to 104 (AFP)) Meanwhile, Gen. Ramos reported more than 20 violent incidents during the polling which included "snatchings" of ballot box, "strafings" of polling places, and voter harassment.

In Mindanao, from December 31 to January 1, eight were killed in six incidents, including the acting mayor of San Miguel, Zamboanga del Sur, on Jan. 1. On Jan. 2, a pro-administration town council candidate in Escalante, Negros Occidental; a KBL mayoral candidate and former mayor of Roxas, Zamboanga del Norte; and a police detective in Bacolod, were shot dead. In Nueva Vizcaya, an administration mayoral candidate was reported missing and later found beheaded. A political leader, kidnapped by five masked men in Mindanao on Jan. 9, was found dead three days later. On Jan. 11, an opposition mayoral candidate was shot at a campaign rally in Saint Bernard, Southern Leyte. On Jan. 12, two gunmen shot to death a town council candidate in Zamboanga del Sur. A shooting incident occurred in Manila on Jan. 14. Three days prior to elections, a land mine explosion in Kapatagan, Lanao del Norte, killed four people, including KBL mayoral and vice-mayoral candidates. On the eve of elections, administration gubernatorial candidate Roy Padilla was shot dead during a rally in Camarines Norte; seven were killed in grenade attacks in Surigao City, Quezon, and Nueva Ecija where two died in a pro-administration rally.

On election day in Bacolod, an election worker was shot dead while trying to prevent stealing of ballot boxes. Three separate clashes with communist rebels resulted in the deaths of at least nine soldiers. A shooting incident was reported in Makati. In Cebu, on January 21, Thaddeus Durano, a defeated candidate in Danao, was shot and injured. Charges of attempted murder were filed against his elder brother, Jesus. Thaddeus accused his opponents, Jesus and their father, Ramon, both who had run the city for decades, of vote buying and fraud.

Meanwhile, there were several reports of fraud; most opposition candidates alleged such due to inaccurate registration lists. In one incident prior to the elections, officials found a ballot box already stuffed with 250 votes. In Iloilo, the communists were involved in ballot snatching in a raid.

It was reported that for the first time in the communist insurgency, the election was used by the guerrillas to raise funds for arms purchases abroad and consolidated local power bases through kidnappings and selective support for hundreds of candidates. Hence, these contributed to the decrease of violence. Nevertheless, the NPA, whose rebel forces said to be active in three-fourths of the provinces, stepped up its guerrilla attacks including murdering right-wing candidates.

Guerrilla leaders confirmed accusations by Ramos that they had been charging candidates for "safe-conduct passes," reportedly cost a total of ₱10,000 (about $500) each, allowing the latter to campaign without being harmed in guerrilla zones. The nationwide total reportedly reached $2 million; for instance, in the Bicol Region, more than $150,000 was collected. COMELEC said the communists were supporting a tenth of the candidates.

=== Aftermath ===
Before the proclamation of all the winners, Aquino, in her weekly program, said the election would help stabilize the country as voters were expected to be cooperative with candidates.

The alliance between the PDP–Laban and the LnB gave way to the establishment of the Laban ng Demokratikong Pilipino in 1988, merging all pro-administration political parties and groups. With this, the administration's strength in the then 200-member House of Representatives grew from more than 60 (combined) in 1987 to 158 in 1991.

== See also ==
- Commission on Elections
- Politics of the Philippines
- Philippine elections
