= Baguio's at-large congressional district =

House of Representatives of the Philippines legislative district

- Constituency for the House of Representatives of the Philippines
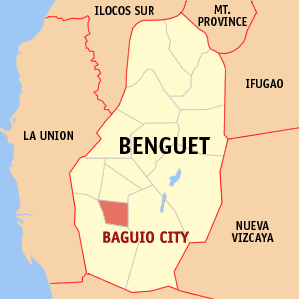
- Location of Baguio within Benguet
- City: Baguio
- Region: Cordillera Administrative Region
- Population: 366,358 (2020)
- Electorate: 166,416 (2025)
- Area: 57.51 km^{2} (22.20 sq mi)

Current constituency
- Created: 1992
- Representative: Mauricio Domogan
- Political party: Lakas
- Congressional bloc: Majority

Baguio's at-large congressional district refers to the lone congressional district of the Philippines in the city of Baguio. It has been represented in the House of Representatives of the Philippines since 1992. It was previously included or known as Benguet's 1st congressional district from 1987 to 1995. The district is currently represented in the 20th Congress by Mauricio Domogan of the Lakas–CMD.

== List of members representing the district ==
=== National Assembly (1935–1945) ===
==== Second Republic ====
Seat A						Seat B						Legislature	Constituent LGUs
Portrait	Member	Term of office		Party	Electoral history	Portrait	Member	Term of office		Party	Electoral history	Legislature	Constituent LGUs
Portrait	Member	Start	End	Party	Electoral history	Portrait	Member	Start	End	Party	Electoral history	Legislature	Constituent LGUs
District re-created September 7, 1943.
	Florendo Aquino	September 25, 1943	February 2, 1944	KALIBAPI	Elected in 1943.		Nicasio Valderrosa	September 25, 1943	February 2, 1944	KALIBAPI	Appointed as an ex officio member. (Note: As Mayor of Baguio.)	National Assembly (Second Republic)	1943–1944; Baguio
District dissolved into Benguet's at-large district for the House of Representatives.

=== Batasang Pambansa (1978–1986) ===
Portrait	Member	Term of office		Legislature	Party	Electoral history	Constituent LGUs
Portrait	Member	Start	End	Legislature	Party	Electoral history	Constituent LGUs
District re-created February 1, 1984.
	Honorato Aquino	June 30, 1984	March 25, 1986	Regular Batasang Pambansa	UNIDO	Elected in 1984.	1984–1986; Baguio

=== House of Representatives (1987–present) ===
==== As Benguet's 1st district ====
Portrait	Member	Term of office		Legislature	Party	Electoral history	Constituent LGUs
Portrait	Member	Start	End	Legislature	Party	Electoral history	Constituent LGUs
District re-created February 2, 1987.
	Honorato Aquino	June 30, 1987	June 30, 1992	8th Congress	LnB	Elected in 1987.	1987–1995; Baguio
	Honorato Aquino	June 30, 1987	June 30, 1992	8th Congress	LDP	Elected in 1987.	1987–1995; Baguio
	Bernardo Vergara	June 30, 1992	June 30, 1995	9th Congress	NPC	Elected in 1992.	1987–1995; Baguio
District designated as Baguio's at-large district.

==== As Baguio's at-large district ====
Portrait	Member	Term of office		Legislature	Party	Electoral history	Constituent LGUs
Portrait	Member	Start	End	Legislature	Party	Electoral history	Constituent LGUs
	Bernardo Vergara	June 30, 1995	June 30, 2001	10th Congress	Lakas	Redistricted from Benguet's 1st district and re-elected in 1995.	1995–present Baguio
	Bernardo Vergara	June 30, 1995	June 30, 2001	11th Congress	Lakas	Re-elected in 1998.	1995–present Baguio
	Mauricio Domogan	June 30, 2001	June 30, 2010	12th Congress	Lakas	Elected in 2001.	1995–present Baguio
	Mauricio Domogan	June 30, 2001	June 30, 2010	13th Congress	Lakas	Re-elected in 2004.	1995–present Baguio
	Mauricio Domogan	June 30, 2001	June 30, 2010	14th Congress	Lakas	Re-elected in 2007.	1995–present Baguio
	Bernardo Vergara	June 30, 2010	June 30, 2013	15th Congress	Lakas	Elected in 2010.	1995–present Baguio
	Nicasio Aliping Jr.	June 30, 2013	June 30, 2016	16th Congress	Independent	Elected in 2013.	1995–present Baguio
	Mark Go	June 30, 2016	June 30, 2025	17th Congress	Nacionalista	Elected in 2016.	1995–present Baguio
	Mark Go	June 30, 2016	June 30, 2025	18th Congress	Nacionalista	Re-elected in 2019.	1995–present Baguio
	Mark Go	June 30, 2016	June 30, 2025	19th Congress	Nacionalista	Re-elected in 2022.	1995–present Baguio
	Mauricio Domogan	June 30, 2025	Incumbent	20th Congress	Independent	Elected in 2025.	1995–present Baguio
	Mauricio Domogan	June 30, 2025	Incumbent	20th Congress	Lakas	Elected in 2025.	1995–present Baguio

== Election results ==
=== 1984 ===
1984 Philippine parliamentary election in Baguio
Party	Candidate	Votes	%
UNIDO	Honorato Aquino	18,346	23.35
KBL	Luis Lardizabal	16,785	21.37
KBL	Ramon Labo Jr.	14,490	18.44
KBL	Jaime Bugnosen	12,323	15.69
Independent	Leonides Bautista	8,482	10.80
Independent	Benjamin Rillera	3,145	4.00
Nacionalista	Galleazo Bucaycay	2,540	3.23
Independent	Pedro Claravall	842	5.73
KBL	Teopisto Rondez	665	0.85
Social Democratic Party (Philippines)	Rafaels Wasan	497	0.55
Independent	George Angel	200	0.13
Independent	Jeorge Manalo	155	0.20
Independent	Melchor Paras	200	0.12

=== 1995 ===
1995 Philippine House of Representatives elections in Baguio
Party	Candidate	Votes	%
Lakas	Bernardo Vergara (incumbent)	48,535	95.35
NPC	Zosimo Paredes	1,431	2.81
LDP	Honorato Aquino	914	1.80
Independent	Felipe Ramos	23	0.05
Total votes		50,903	100.00
Lakas hold			

=== 1998 ===
1998 Philippine House of Representatives elections in Baguio
Party	Candidate	Votes	%
Lakas	Bernardo Vergara (incumbent)	63,597	73.15
LAMMP	Honorato Aquino	22,119	25.44
LM	Felipe Ramos	1,220	1.40
Total votes		86,936	100.00
Lakas hold			

=== 2010 ===
2010 Philippine House of Representatives elections in Baguio
Party	Candidate	Votes	%
Lakas–Kampi	Bernardo Vergara	27,020	25.88
Nacionalista	Rocky Thomas Balisong	17,965	17.21
Liberal	Leandro Yangot Jr.	16,639	15.94
PMP	Edgar Avila	15,395	14.75
Independent	Reinaldo Bautista Jr.	12,833	12.29
LDP	Braulio Yaranon	9,774	9.36
PDP–Laban	Rabindranath Quilala	3,819	3.66
Independent	Dwight Bello	793	0.76
Independent	Felipe Ramos	155	0.15
Valid ballots		104,393	96.65
Invalid or blank votes		3,618	3.35
Total votes		108,011	100.00
Lakas–Kampi hold			

=== 2013 ===
2013 Philippine House of Representatives elections in Baguio
Party	Candidate	Votes	%
Independent	Nicasio Aliping Jr.	33,402	38.40
Liberal	Mark Go	31,529	36.25
UNA	Bernardo Vergara (incumbent)	20,902	24.03
Independent	Miguel Arvisu	576	0.66
Independent	Richard Zarate	478	0.55
Independent	Roam Manuel	89	0.10
Total votes		86,976	100.00
Independent gain from UNA			

=== 2016 ===
2016 Philippine House of Representatives elections in Baguio
Party	Candidate	Votes	%
Nacionalista	Mark Go	45,687	41.27
Independent	Nicasio Aliping Jr. (incumbent)	40,766	36.82
NPC	Bernardo Vergara	20,649	18.65
Independent	Rudy Aspilan	2,957	2.67
Independent	Edgardo Duque	648	0.59
Valid ballots		110,707	95.50
Invalid or blank votes		5,222	4.50
Total votes		115,929	100.00
Nacionalista gain from Independent			

=== 2019 ===
2019 Philippine House of Representatives elections in Baguio
Party	Candidate	Votes	%
Nacionalista	Mark Go (incumbent)	58,603	52.65
UNA	Mauricio Domogan	30,443	27.35
Liberal	Nicasio Aliping Jr.	17,134	15.39
Lakas	Reinaldo Bautista Jr.	4,447	3.99
PDDS	Rama Krishna Rosalin-Wasan	689	0.62
Total votes		111,316	100.00
Nacionalista hold			

=== 2022 ===
2022 Philippine House of Representatives elections in Baguio
Party	Candidate	Votes	%
Nacionalista	Mark Go (incumbent)	99,372	75.11
Independent	Nicasio Aliping Jr.	30,156	22.79
Independent	Edgardo Duque	982	0.74
PDDS	Rafael Wasan	729	0.55
Independent	Reynaldo Diaz Jr.	689	0.52
Independent	Alexis Abano	375	0.28
Valid ballots		132,303	94.87
Invalid or blank votes		7,158	5.13
Total votes		139,461	100.00
Nacionalista hold			

=== 2025 ===
2025 Philippine House of Representatives elections in Baguio
Party	Candidate	Votes	%
Independent	Mauricio Domogan	99,372	75.11
PFP	Isabelo Cosalan Jr.	32,690	25.49
Lakas	Sol Go	20,149	15.71
Independent	Nicasio Aliping Jr.	17,551	13.68
NPC	Gladys Vergara	10,624	8.28
Independent	Francis Rae Camtugan II	1,258	0.98
Independent	Win-Win Demoni	228	0.18
Total votes		128,267	100.00
Independent gain from Nacionalista			
