= Benjamin Magalong =

Filipino politician and retired police officer (born 1960)

Benjamin B. Magalong
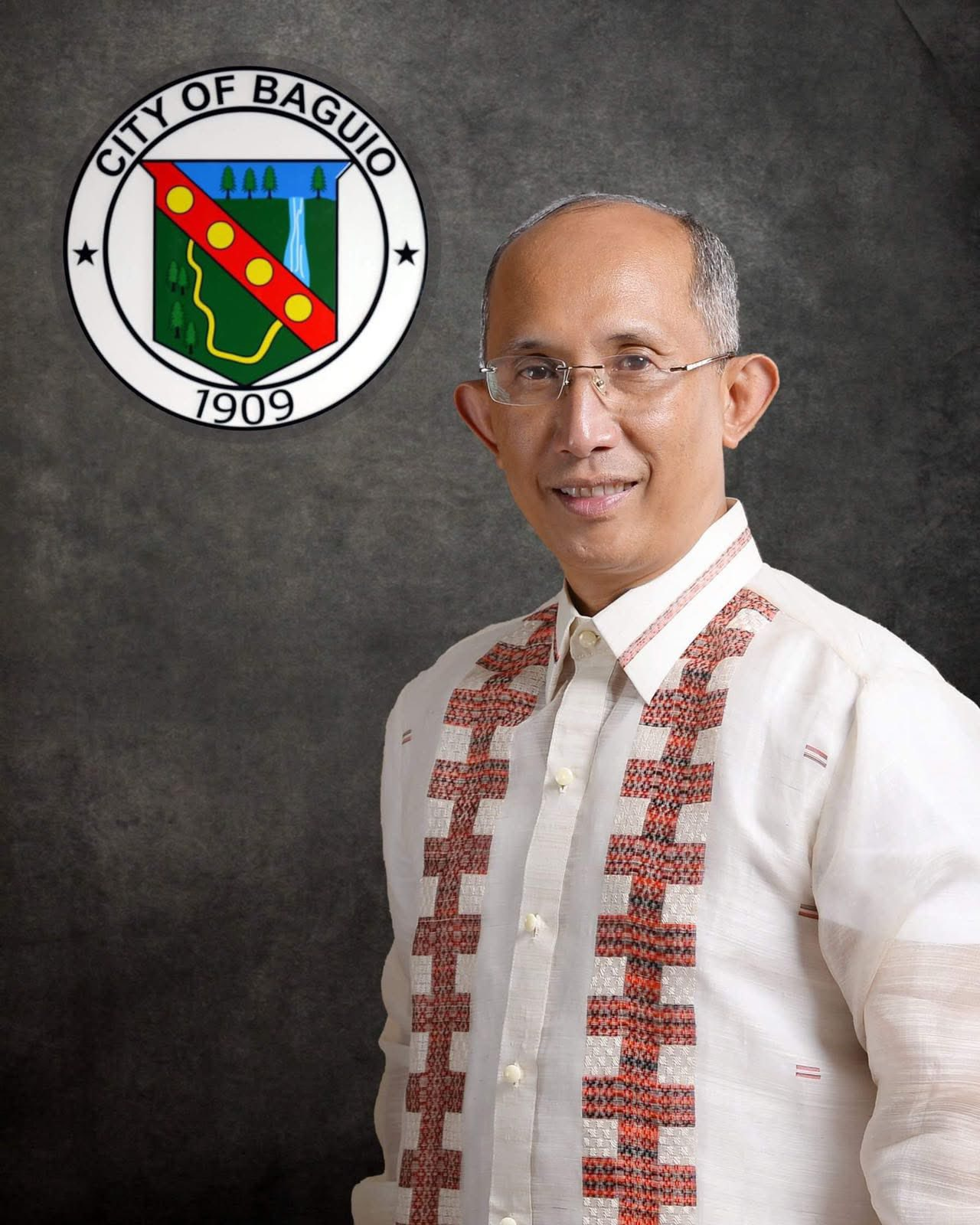
- Official portrait, 2021

27th Mayor of Baguio
- Incumbent
- Assumed office June 30, 2019
- Vice Mayor: Faustino A. Olowan
- Preceded by: Mauricio Domogan

Special Adviser and Investigator of the Independent Commission for Infrastructure
- In office September 15, 2025 – September 26, 2025
- President: Ferdinand R. Marcos Jr.
- Preceded by: Position established
- Succeeded by: Rodolfo Azurin Jr.

IATF-EID Contact Tracing Czar
- In office March 16, 2020 – January 29, 2021
- President: Rodrigo Duterte
- Preceded by: Position established
- Succeeded by: Vacant

Deputy Chief for Operations of the Philippine National Police
- In office July 1, 2016 – December 15, 2016
- President: Rodrigo Duterte
- Preceded by: PDDG. Danilo S. Constantino
- Succeeded by: PDDG. Ramon C. Apolinario

Director of the Directorate for Investigation and Detective Management
- In office July 11, 2015 – July 1, 2016
- President: Benigno Aquino III
- Preceded by: PDir. Francisco Don C. Montenegro
- Succeeded by: C/Supt. Augusto M. Marquez Jr.

Director of the Criminal Investigation and Detection Group
- In office December 7, 2013 – July 11, 2015
- President: Benigno Aquino III
- Preceded by: Dir. Francisco A. Uyami Jr.
- Succeeded by: C/Supt. Victor P. Deona

Regional Director of Police Regional Office Cordillera
- In office October 29, 2011 – December 7, 2013
- President: Benigno Aquino III
- Preceded by: C/Supt. Villamor C. Bumanglag
- Succeeded by: C/Supt. Isagani R. Nerez

Personal details
- Born: Benjamin Bañez Magalong; December 15, 1960 (age 65) Baguio, Philippines
- Party: NPC (2018–present)
- Other political affiliations: AKAY (2024)
- Spouse: Arlene Saneo
- Children: 3
- Education: Saint Louis University (secondary)
- Alma mater: Philippine Military Academy (BS); FBI National Academy (short course)
- Occupation: Retired Police Officer
- Website: benjaminmagalong.com
- Police career
- Service: Philippine National Police
- Allegiance: Philippines
- Divisions: Deputy Chief for Operations, PNP; Directorate for Investigation and Detective Management; Criminal Investigation and Detection Group; Police Regional Office Cordillera
- Service years: 1982–2016
- Rank: Police Deputy Director General

Benjamin "Benjie" Bañez Magalong (born December 15, 1960) is a Filipino politician and retired police officer serving as the mayor of Baguio since 2019. Before entering politics, he served in the Philippine Constabulary and Philippine National Police (PNP) for 38 years. He was the chief of the Cordillera regional police office, the Criminal Investigation and Detection Group (CIDG), and the Directorate for Investigation and Detective Management (DIDM). He retired with the rank of Police Deputy Director General as the PNP's Deputy Chief for Operations.

Born and raised in Baguio, Magalong graduated from the Philippine Military Academy in 1982. He first served in Abra and Agusan del Norte before joining the Special Action Force (SAF) and heading its Special Operations Battalion from 1997 to 2001. He was accused of plotting to assassinate President Gloria Macapagal Arroyo in 2001 but was later cleared in 2005. He then led the quelling of the March 2005 prison riot in Camp Bagong Diwa. In 2006, he was detained for three months after joining an alleged failed coup attempt against Arroyo. After his reinstatement, he was assigned to the Philippine Drug Enforcement Agency (PDEA) and the Quezon City police office. He then became the director of the CIDG and chairman of the PNP Board of Inquiry on the Mamasapano Incident. Magalong published the investigation report on March 13, 2015, which implicated PNP chief Alan Purisima and President Benigno Aquino III of misconduct leading to the deaths of 44 SAF troopers.

In 2019, Magalong testified before the Senate accusing PNP chief Oscar Albayalde of protecting police officers involved in the drug trade.

He served as the contact tracing czar of the Philippine government's response to the COVID-19 pandemic from July 2020 until his resignation on January 29, 2021.

He also led the formation of Mayors for Good Governance (M4GG).

== Early life and education ==
Benjie Magalong was born in Baguio on December 15, 1960, to Severiano Magalong Sr. (1929–2021) and Fortunata Bañez of San Carlos, Pangasinan.

He spent his elementary days at Saint Louis University Laboratory Elementary School. He finished high school at what was then-Saint Louis Boys' High School (now Saint Louis University Laboratory High School).

He entered Saint Louis University for one-year, before entering the Philippine Military Academy, where he graduated as Magna cum laude in 1982's Sandigan class.

During his career, he graduated from the FBI National Academy. He also completed the Counter Terrorists Operation Course in Louisiana, USA, and the Senior Crisis Management Course in Washington, DC.

== Police career ==
=== Philippine Constabulary ===
Upon graduating in 1982, he joined the Philippine Constabulary and was assigned to its 62nd Battalion in Abra. During his stay there he was later promoted to the rank of captain. He would later on be assigned to Agusan del Norte.

==== 1986 People Power Revolution in Baguio ====
Magalong, who was then a lieutenant in command of the Philippine Constabulary detachment in Buguias, Benguet, played a key part in 1986 People Power Revolution in the Cordillera, as the first officer to defect from the administration of Ferdinand Marcos. He left a skeletal force in command of their post in northern Benguet and left for Baguio on the evening of February 23, going to the Baguio City Police station where he disarmed the station personnel to prevent any untoward incident. They were then welcomed upon proceeding to the Baguio Cathedral, where residents had gathered to protest the abuses of the Marcos administration.

=== Philippine National Police ===
During the early days of the merger of the Philippine Constabulary and the Integrated National Police, Magalong experienced the CIDG for the first time. He later on described it as "not his world". He was transferred to the Special Action Force (SAF) of the PNP, founded in 1983 by then Gen. (later President) Fidel Ramos of the PC. From 1997 to 2001, he headed its Special Operations Battalion, which is PNP's counterterrorism group.

==== 2001 EDSA Revolution ====
Vice President Gloria Macapagal Arroyo ascended to the presidency after President Joseph Estrada was removed from power in the Second EDSA Revolution. Magalong was later accused of plotting to assassinate Arroyo. Magalong described it as "a false charge; my name was used by some parties who wished to ingratiate themselves with the new administration." While he was under investigation, he was assigned to hazardous areas, to the Cordilleras in 2001 and back to Mindanao in 2003. He was absolved of the charges against him in March 2025.

==== 2005 Bicutan Siege ====
On March 14, 2005, inmates in Camp Bagong Diwa seized weapons from the guards. Magalong led the assault on the Camp, with 64 other SAF troopers. It resulted in 27 dead inmates and the surviving inmates accusing the SAF of committing a massacre and human rights violations. It was during this siege that Magalong almost died, evidenced by his kevlar helmet with two bullets embedded in it. He keeps it in his office as a reminder.

==== 2006 State of Emergency ====
On February 24, 2006, President Gloria Macapagal Arroyo issued Proclamation 1017, declaring a state of emergency existed in the country. Malacañang justified this as they claimed to have foiled a coup d'état attempt, involving several members of the Armed Forces of the Philippines and the Philippine National Police. Among those alleged perpetrators was Supt. Benjamin Magalong, alleged to have been participating in the destabilization efforts and attempting to recruit men to beef up the main destabilization force. He later on admitted his role in the plot and was imprisoned for three months.

==== Police Regional Office Cordillera (PRO-COR) ====
Magalong was appointed as head of the Regional Office of the PNP in Cordillera or PRO-COR on October 29, 2011, succeeding C/Supt. Villamor Bumanglag. Under his administration, several advances were made, such as a purchase of ammo reloading machines, which cut the costs for reloading slug and a GIS-based crime mapping system was launched, which tracks hazard-prone areas and recent crime data in the region. Abra and Kalinga also experienced its most peaceful elections in 2013. He was succeeded by C/Supt. Isagani Nerez

==== Criminal Investigation and Detection Group (CIDG) ====
In December 2013, he returned for the second time to the CIDG and this was appointed as its new chief, succeeding Dir. Francisco Uyami Jr. The CIDG is the PNP's primary investigation arm. Magalong was originally intended to head the Directorate for Intelligence (DI), but was instead appointed to the CIDG. He said in an interview for the Asian Dragon Magazine that he did not want the post due to its highly politicized nature and that he even tried to exchange commands with Gen. Calima who was appointed in his stead as DI Chief, but Gen. Calima did not want anything to do with the post. He assumed the post and afterwards worked with the 14-man National Advisory Council, with the goal of the PNP transformation program known as "PATROL PLAN 2030".

==== 2015 Mamasapano crisis ====
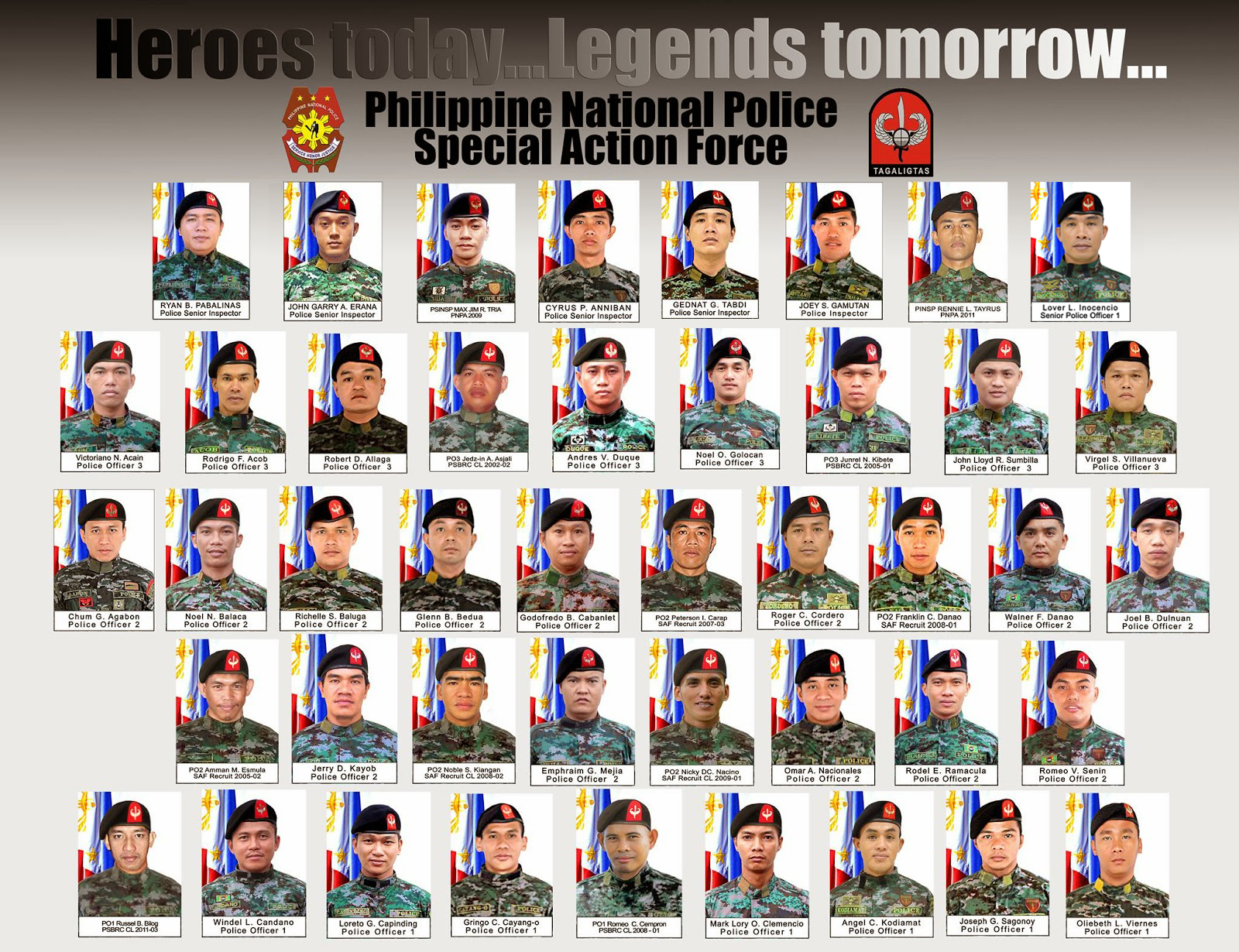
The Fallen 44 of the Special Action Forces

Gen. Magalong led the Board of Inquiry (BOI) on the Mamasapano incident. Pressure came from various groups telling him to either soften the president's liability or to not release the report at all. On March 13, 2015, the BOI released their report on the incident. It indicted President Benigno Aquino III, Gen. Alan Purisima, and SAF Chief Getulio Napeñas as liable for the deaths of the 44 SAF troopers for bypassing the chain of command.

==== Post-Mamasapano inquiry ====
After the report had been released, he was transferred to the PNP Directorate for Investigation and Detective Management in July 2015 by the new PNP Chief Ricardo Marquez, his classmate in the 1982 Sandigan Class, succeeding Dir. Francisco Montenegro.

In 2016, incoming PNP Chief Ronald "Bato" Dela Rosa said that he will appoint Magalong as his Deputy Chief of Operations.

==== Retirement from the PNP ====
After reaching the mandatory retirement age of 56, Gen. Magalong retired on December 15, 2016, from the Philippine National Police, as the Deputy Chief of Operations, having served for more than 38 years. He received 166 military and PNP achievement and merit medals for his combat and law enforcement accomplishments, among which, are the Distinguished Conduct Star, the Distinguished Service Star, the PNP Gold Cross and 15 Outstanding Achievement Medals. He was succeeded by PDDG. Ramon Apolinario.

== Post-retirement ==
Since his retirement, Magalong has served as Senior Vice president for Operations of Steel Asia, one of the largest steel manufacturers in Asia until November 1, 2018. On January 5, 2018 President Duterte appointed him to serve as a director of the Philippine National Oil Company or PNOC, to serve the unexpired term of Bruce Concepcion until June 30, 2018.

== Political career ==
=== Mayor of Baguio (2019–present) ===
==== 2019 election ====
On October 17, 2018, Magalong filed his certificate of candidacy for the mayoralty post of Baguio. He ran under a platform of speedy government action, revitalizing the environment, innovating peace and order condition, aggressive traffic management, empowering the youth and a responsive education program. He would go against 8 others, mostly veteran politicians including Vice Mayor Edison Bilog, councilors Ed Avila and Leandro Yangot Jr. and former councilor Jose Molintas.

On the night of May 13, 2019, election day, he was declared as the winner of the 2019 mayoral polls garnering 41,482 votes, a large margin over his closest contender, Vice Mayor Bilog, who garnered 22,670 votes. He was proclaimed along with re-elected Congressman Marquez Go and Vice Mayor-elect Faustino A. Olowan. He succeeded outgoing three-term Mayor Mauricio Domogan.

A month after his proclamation as the winner in the mayoral elections, Magalong warned establishments in the city of the existence of several persons using his name to supposedly extort money or place food orders, mostly in restaurants he and his family frequents.

==== Mayoralty ====
===== 2019 =====
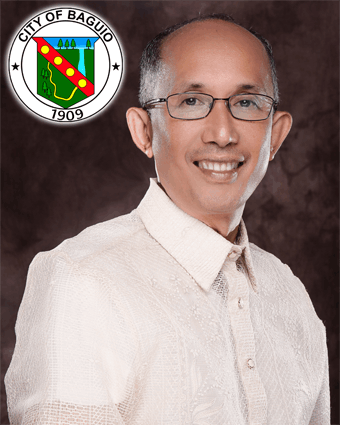
Official portrait, 2019

During his inauguration on June 30, 2019, Magalong outlined his 10-point agenda for Baguio for the next three years. The list included:

- Speeding Up Government Action
- Revitalizing The Environment
- Innovating Peace and Order Condition
- Aggressive Traffic Management
- Responsive Education Program
- Empowering the Youth
- Expanding Health and Social Services
- Responsible Tourism
- Enlivened Culture, Arts, Crafts, and Heritage
- Market Modernization

Faced with the city's massive waste problem, he began office by temporarily halting the collection of biodegradable waste due to the malfunction of the city's waste-to-fertilizer machines. According to him, a possible solution to would be waste-to-energy technology, which will be initially tested by PNOC. He also ordered Baguio's dumpsite in Irisan be converted into an ecopark by 2020.

Several establishment were closed due to lacking or erroneous permits. Massive cleanup drives of the city began since he took office. In accordance with President Duterte's order to clear public roads, several obstructions in the city's roads such as construction and advertising materials were ordered immediately removed.

He further expanded his 10-point agenda to 15 points, adding the following to his agenda:

- Efficient Disaster Management
- Empowered and Accountable Barangay Governance
- Strengthened Livelihood and Entrepreneurial Services
- Unemployment Reduction
- Resolution of IP clans and claims

In a move to revitalize the air quality in the city's main thoroughfare, the ascending lane (right side) of Session Road will be closed to traffic every Sunday beginning August 4 for 4 weeks thereafter. However, due to concerns aired, the implementation was postponed to August 18. The closure was extended for up to 6 months every Sunday, beginning August 18, 2019.

In September 2019, he expressed his dismay over the ongoing rehabilitation of the Baguio Convention Center, and has since then vowed that he will not tolerate substandard work adding it was about time these contractors became answerable to the people.

He also testified before a Senate hearing on "ninja cops", accusing then-PNP General Oscar Albayalde of blocking the dismissal of 13 policemen involved in an irregular drug raid in 2013, from which some policemen had allegedly profited from. In October 2019, days after his testimony at the Senate, Magalong revealed that he has been receiving death threats and is worried for his family.

In November 2019, Magalong supported one of the city's POSD officer for performing his task impartially. Judge Nelson Largo of Cabanatuan parked his car in a no parking area, causing the officer to issue him a parking ticket and have the license plate of the car removed, to which Largo retaliated by issuing a subpoena, calling the act of removing the license plates as a violation of due process. Magalong called Judge Largo's actions of having the enforcers subpoenaed as unprofessional and arrogant and said he himself was prepared to accompany the enforcers involved. Days later, during a probe launched by the Supreme Court, Largo retracted the subpoena. The Baguio City Council declared Largo as persona non grata.

===== 2020 =====
In December 2019, amidst the influx of tourists into the city, Magalong ordered an aggressive anti-littering campaign, leading to the arrest of 49 people as of January 2020 and has promised that he will continue such campaign.

In January 2020, Magalong, along with DILG Secretary Eduardo Año and DOT Secretary Bernadette Romulo-Puyat officially launched the rehabilitation of the city, which they estimate may last more than three years. The city, however, will not be closed to the public, unlike the rehabilitation efforts done in Boracay.

During a top level meeting on the problems hounding the city, specifically on its air quality, solid waste management and water pollution and supply, Magalong said in jest that the water used to grow the famous strawberries come from the cesspool of Baguio, which is illegally discharged into the Balili River. The statement caused disdain to La Trinidad and Benguet officials. La Trinidad Mayor Romeo Salda disproved Magalong's statement, saying that no irrigation comes from the Balili River as they only source it from the creek of Pico and Puguis. Magalong later issued a statement of apology, saying, "I came up with uncalled for statement that I should have not said at all. I was wrong and I apologize," emphasizing that he was pertaining to the issue of the city's guilt of polluting the river which flows into the municipality of La Trinidad.

In late January, due to the threat posed by the COVID-19 pandemic, Magalong canceled the opening parade of the Panagbenga Festival and other major events within the next three weeks, also affecting the CARAA Games. In an interview, Magalong stated that "the tourism revenues are the least of my concerns. My main priorities are the health of my constituents," which earned him praise from all sectors, especially from the residents of Baguio. The Panagbenga Festival was later rescheduled to late March 21–29, a month from the original scheduled date, but was scrapped altogether due to the ensuing COVID-19 lockdown.

=== COVID-19 National Chief Tracing Czar ===
On July 13, Magalong was appointed by the national government as the chief of contact tracing efforts (Contact Tracing Czar) of the Philippine government's response to the COVID-19 pandemic, overseeing and recommending contact tracing efforts on a national basis. Magalong's COVID-19 testing and tracing policies in Baguio were hailed by medical experts as a model that the whole country should follow.

Six months later, he and his wife Arlene were seen together with other celebrities and high society personalities in a "super-spreader" birthday party hosted by socialite and eventologist Tim Yap at The Manor at Camp John Hay on January 17, 2021. Despite the prevalent lockdown, evident quarantine violations were observed, among others nil social distancing and guests not wearing face masks. Magalong acknowledged the lapses and his presence in that event, and on January 29, he announced his immediate resignation as the country's contact tracing czar. Despite the Duterte administration rejecting it, he insisted that the resignation is irrevocable, but will still help the task force in its COVID-19 response efforts.

==== 2022 election ====
On October 5, 2021, Magalong filed his COC for re-election for a second term. He faced off against former Mayor Mauricio Domogan, former Vice Mayor Edison Bilog and perennial candidate Jeffrey Pinnic. As of 3:18 PM of May 13, when 100% of the votes were already canvassed, Magalong garnered 70,342 votes, Narrowly beating former Mayor Mauricio Domogan by a small margin of 17,144 votes, both Domogan and Bilog would concede a day after the election. Magalong would then continue to serve as Mayor of Baguio with his second term starting on June 30, 2022.

=== Flood-control controversy ===
On September 15, 2025, he was appointed by President Bongbong Marcos as the special adviser and investigator of the Independent Commission for Infrastructure, which is mandated to investigate anomalous infrastructure projects. On September 26, 2025, he resigned as the special adviser and investigator due to conflict of interest. He clarified there was no such conflict of interest.

== Awards and honors ==
=== Decorations ===
Among his decorations include:

- Medalya ng Kabayanihan (PNP Distinguished Conduct Medal)
- Medalya ng Katapatan sa Paglilingkod (PNP Distinguished Service Medal)
- Medalya ng Katangitanging Gawa (PNP Outstanding Achievement Medal)
- Medalya ng Kagitingan (PNP Medal of Valor)
- Medalya ng Katapangan (PNP Bravery Medal)
- Medalya ng Pambihirang Paglilingkod (PNP Special Service Medal)
- Medalya ng Paglilingkod (PNP Service Medal)
- Medalya ng Kasanayan (PNP Efficiency Medal)
- Medalya ng Paglilingkod sa Luzon (PNP Luzon Campaign Medal)
- Medalya ng Pagtulong sa Nasalanta (PNP Disaster Relief and Rehabilitation Operations Campaign Medal)
- Medalya ng Papuri (PNP Commendation Medal)
- Medalya ng Mabuting Asal (PNP Good Conduct Medal)
- Medalya ng Paglaban sa Manliligalig (PNP Anti-dissidence Campaign Medal)
- Bronze Cross Medal
- Military Merit Medal
- Wounded Personnel Medal
- Silver Wing Medal
- Military Commendation Medal
- Military Civic Action Medal

=== Presidential Lingkod Bayan Award ===
In 2013, Magalong was conferred the Presidential Lingkod Bayan award for his peacekeeping initiatives in Kalinga and Abra; GIS-based crime mapping system; PNP 2030 patrol initiatives; human resource development program; and environment advocacy, among others.

=== Outstanding Citizen of Baguio ===
During the celebration of the city's founding anniversary on September 1, 2017, Magalong was awarded as an outstanding citizen of Baguio, along with Joanne Jularbal Balderas and Dionisio R. Claridad Jr.

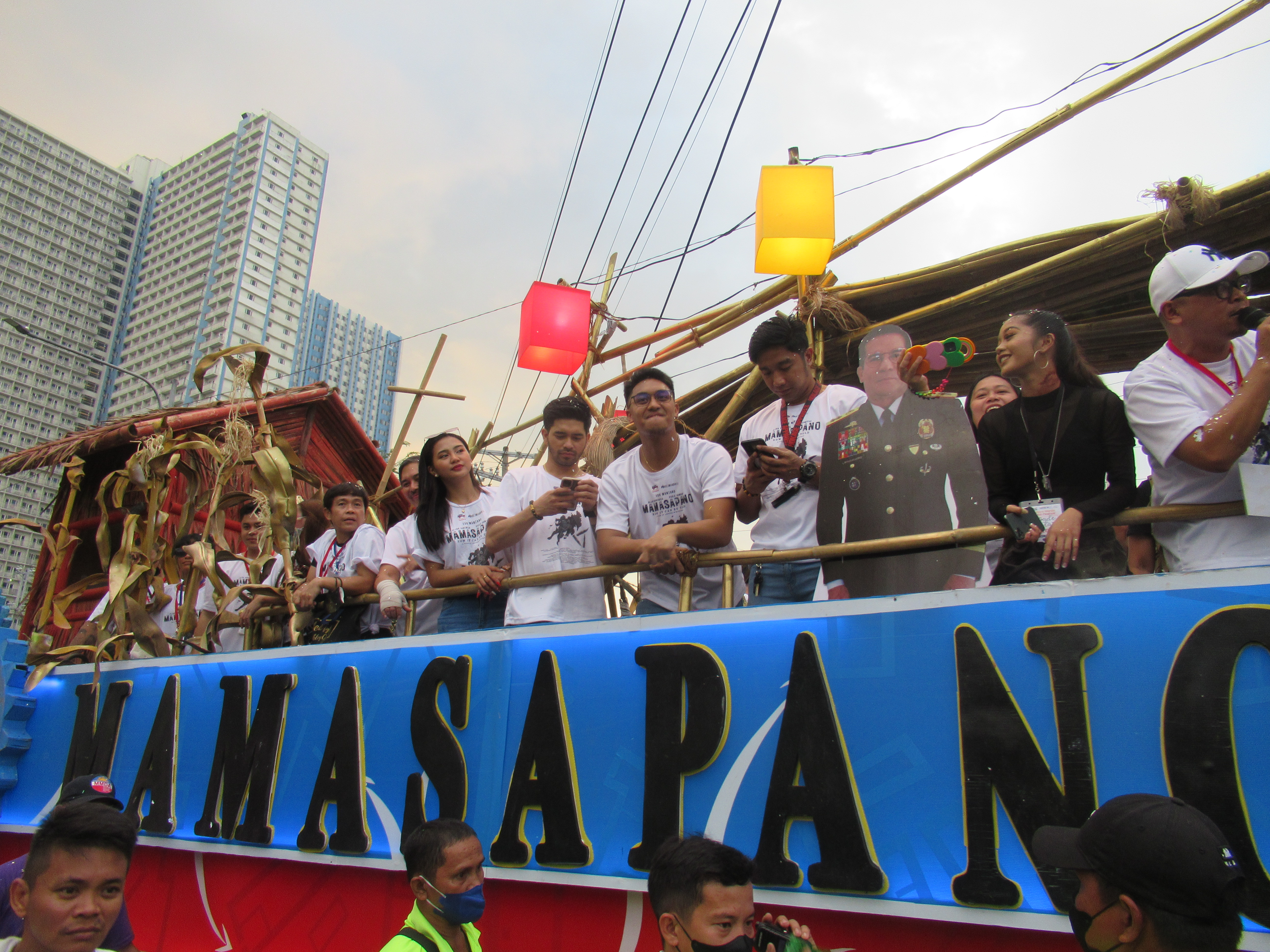
Magalong at the 2022 Metro Manila Film Festival

== Personal life ==
=== In popular culture ===
Magalong was portrayed by Edu Manzano in the 2023 film Mamasapano: Now It Can Be Told, of the 2022 Metro Manila Film Festival directed by Lester Dimarana, and based on Mamasapano clash.

== Electoral history ==
Electoral history of Benjamin Magalong
Year	Office	Party	Votes received				Result
Year	Office	Party	Total	%	P.	Swing	Result
2019	Mayor of Baguio	NPC	41,482	37.29%	1st	—N/a	Won
2022	Mayor of Baguio	NPC	70,342	51.75%	1st	+14.46	Won
2025	Mayor of Baguio	NPC	55,497	42.80%	1st	-8.95	Won

Police appointments
Preceded by PDDG. Danilo S. Constantino	Deputy Chief for Operations of the Philippine National Police	Succeeded by PDDG. Ramon C. Apolinario
Preceded by PDir. Francisco Don C. Montenegro	Director of the Directorate for Investigation and Detective Management	Succeeded by C/Supt. Augusto M. Marquez Jr.
Preceded by Dir. Francisco A. Uyami Jr.	Director of the Criminal Investigation and Detection Group	Succeeded by C/Supt. Victor P. Deona
Preceded by C/Supt. Villamor C. Bumanglag	Regional Director of Police Regional Office Cordillera	Succeeded by C/Supt. Isagani R. Nerez
