= Bernardo Vergara =

Filipino politician and professional civil engineer

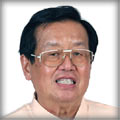
- Official portrait, 2010

Member of the Philippine House of Representatives from Baguio's Lone District
- In office June 30, 2010 – June 30, 2013
- Preceded by: Mauricio Domogan
- Succeeded by: Nicasio M. Aliping, Jr.
- In office June 30, 1992 – June 30, 2001
- Preceded by: Honorato Aquino
- Succeeded by: Mauricio Domogan

24th Mayor of Baguio
- In office June 30, 2001 – June 30, 2004
- Vice Mayor: Betty Lourdes F. Tabanda
- Preceded by: Mauricio Domogan
- Succeeded by: Braulio Yaranon

Personal details
- Born: Bernardo Mangaoang Vergara; December 4, 1937 (age 88) Tubao, La Union, Philippine Commonwealth
- Party: NPC (1992–1995; 2015–present); Timpuyog Ti Baguio (local party)
- Other political affiliations: UNA (2012–2015); Lakas (1995–2012)
- Spouse: Gloria A. Vergara
- Children: James, Gladys, Jun, Jona, Gay, Glenda
- Education: National University (BS)
- Occupation: Civil engineer
- Profession: Politician

Bernardo "Bernie" Mangaoang Vergara (born December 4, 1937) is a Filipino politician and professional civil engineer. He served as Congressman from the lone district of Baguio for three terms from 1992 to 2001, 2010-2013 and as mayor of Baguio for one term from 2001 to 2004.

== Early and political career ==
Vergara is a former Department of Public Works and Highways District Engineer. At a young age of 30, he has been known as the country's youngest District Engineer. He has been in public service since the 1960s and has catapulted the Northern Philippines in particular the La Union and Ilocos areas to its premier state, as it is now today. As District Engineer for La Union, he was then tapped by Former President Ferdinand E. Marcos and Former Tourism Secretary Jose D. Aspiras to lead the Philippine Tourism Authority which he served as general manager from 1978 to 1986.

Through his leadership as congressman, he has been instrumental in the upliftment of Baguio ruined by the July 1990 devastating earthquake. He was awarded as the Philippines' Ten Most Outstanding Congressman for two times during his 9 year-tenure. He is most known for his involvement in the reconstruction of Marcos Highway and magnanimous efforts to improve Baguio's economy by way of extensive infrastructure projects.

Vergara won his 4th term as Congressman for the lone Legislative district of Baguio this 2010 elections, as the candidate of Lakas-Kampi-CMD. His 4th term from 2010 to 2013, makes his over-all tenure 12 years as legislator

== Personal life ==
Vergara lives in Baguio with his wife, Gloria, and their six children.
