= Baguio City Council =

Legislative body of the city of Baguio, Philippines

Baguio City Council Sangguniang Panlungsod ng Baguio

Type
- Type: Unicameral
- Term limits: 3 terms (9 years)

Leadership
- Presiding Officer: Faustino A. Olowan, PDP-Laban

Structure
- Seats: 12 councilors (including 2 ex officio members); 1 ex officio presiding officer
- Political groups: UNA (5) Liberal (3) PDP-Laban (2) NUP (1) Nacionalista (1) Nonpartisan (2)
- Length of term: 3 years
- Authority: Baguio City Charter; Local Government Code of the Philippines

Elections
- Voting system: Plurality-at-large voting (10 seats); Indirect elections (2 seats)
- Last election: May 13, 2019
- Next election: May 9, 2022

The Baguio City Council (Filipino: Sangguniang Panlungsod ng Baguio) is Baguio's Sangguniang Panlungsod or legislative body. The council has 15 members consisting of 12 councilors, one ex officio member elected from the ranks of barangay (neighborhood) chairmen, one ex officio member elected from the ranks of Sangguniang Kabataan (youth council) chairmen and one presiding officer. The Vice-mayor of the city is the presiding officer of the council, who is elected citywide.

The council is responsible for creating laws and ordinances under the city's jurisdiction. The mayor can veto proposed bills, but the council can override it with a two-thirds supermajority.

== Powers, duties and functions ==
The Sangguniang Panlungsod, as the legislative body of the city, is mandated by the Local Government Code of 1991 (Republic Act No. 7160) to:

- Enact ordinances;
- Approve resolutions;
- Appropriate funds for the general welfare of the city and its inhabitants; and
- Ensure the proper exercise of the corporate powers of the city as provided for under Section 22 of the Local Government Code.

Furthermore, the following duties and functions are relegated to the Sangguniang Panlungsod:

- Approve ordinances and pass resolutions necessary for an efficient and effective city government;
- Generate and maximize the use of resources and revenues for the development plans, program objectives and priorities of the city as provided for under section 18 of the Local Government Code of 1991, with particular attention to agro-industrial development and citywide growth and progress;
- Enact ordinances granting franchises and authorizing the issuance of permits or licenses, upon such conditions and for such purposes intended to promote the general welfare of the inhabitants of the city but subject to the provisions of Book II of the Local Government Code of 1991;
- Regulate activities relative to the use of land, buildings, and structures within the city in order to promote the general welfare of its inhabitants;
- Approve ordinances which shall ensure the efficient and effective delivery of the basic services and facilities as provided for under Section 17 of the Local Government Code; and
- Exercise such other powers and perform such other duties and functions as may be prescribed by law or ordinance.

== Membership ==
The city elects twelve members of the council at-large. In plurality-at-large voting, a voter may vote for up to ten candidates and the candidates with the ten highest numbers of votes are elected. Barangay and SK chairs throughout the city each elect a representative to the council, for a total of 14 councilors. City-council elections are synchronized with other elections in the country, which have been held on the second Monday of May every third year since 1992.

=== 2019 - 2022 membership ===
These are the members after the 2019 local elections, and 2018 barangay and SK elections:

Position	Name	Party
Presiding Officer	Faustino A. Olowan	PDP–Laban
City; Councilors	Joel A. Alangsab	PDP–Laban
City; Councilors	Benny O. Bomogao	UNA
City; Councilors	Betty Lourdes F. Tabanda	UNA
City; Councilors	Elaine D. Sembrano	PDP–Laban
City; Councilors	Maria Mylen Victoria G. Yaranon	Liberal
City; Councilors	Isabelo B. Cosalan, Jr.	Liberal
City; Councilors	Francisco Roberto A. Ortega VI	UNA
City; Councilors	Arthur L. Allad-iw	Liberal
City; Councilors	Vladimir D. Cayabas	UNA
City; Councilors	Fred L. Bagbagen	NUP
City; Councilors	Lilia A. Fariñas	UNA
City; Councilors	Philian Louise Weygan-Allan	Nacionalista
ABC President	Michael L. Lawana	Nonpartisan
SK Federation President	Levy Lloyd B. Orcales	Nonpartisan
Indigenous Peoples Mandatory Representation	Maximo Hilario Edwin Bugnay Jr.	Nonpartisan

=== IP representation ===
The Baguio City Council has an Indigenous People's Mandatory Representative (IPMR) as a member in compliance with the Indigenous Peoples' Rights Act of 1997. It was only on February 3, 2023 that the IPMR seat would be filled for the very first time. Maximo Hilario Edwin Bugnay Jr., was elected by the Ibaloy, Kankanaey and Kalanguya clans.

== Former councils ==
2016-2019 Membership
Position	Name
Presiding Officer	Edison R. Bilog
City; Councilors	Leandro B. Yangot Jr.
City; Councilors	Edgar M. Avila
City; Councilors	Joel A. Alangsab
City; Councilors	Faustino A. Olowan
City; Councilors	Elmer O. Datuin
City; Councilors	Maria Mylen Victoria G. Yaranon
City; Councilors	Elaine D. Sembrano
City; Councilors	Peter C. Fianza
City; Councilors	Lilia A. Fariñas
City; Councilors	Arthur L. Allad-iw
City; Councilors	Benny O. Bomogao
City; Councilors	Roberto C. Ortega
ABC President	Michael L. Lawana
SK Federation President	Vacant

== Notable members ==
- Bobby Ortega (Member of the council from 1995–2004 and 2010–2017)
