= Jun Labo =

Filipino faith healer and politician

21st Mayor of Baguio
- In office February 2, 1988 – October 15, 1989
- Vice Mayor: Jaime Bugnosen
- Preceded by: Francisco Paraan
- Succeeded by: Jaime Bugnosen
- In office June 30, 1992 – October 24, 1992
- Vice Mayor: Mauricio Domogan
- Preceded by: Jaime Bugnosen
- Succeeded by: Mauricio Domogan

Personal details
- Born: December 23, 1934 (age 91) Dagupan, Pangasinan, Philippine Commonwealth
- Citizenship: Filipino; Australian (formerly)
- Spouse(s): Australian wife (m. 1976; ann. 1980) Ilysabetha Coconachea (date unknown (Note: married as of 2009; annulment filed in 2006. Status of marriage is unknown))
- Occupation: Faith healer, politician

Ramon "Jun" Lozano Labo Jr. (born December 23, 1934 in Dagupan) is a Filipino faith healer and a politician who was elected mayor of Baguio twice in 1988 and 1992 but was disqualified due to being regarded as an Australian citizen under Philippine jurisdiction at the time.

== Early life ==
Ramon Lozano Labo Jr. was born on December 23, 1934 in Dagupan, Pangasinan. His mother is a psychic dentist and a member of the Union Espiritista Christiana de Filipinas an institution which trains faith healers.

== Political career ==
=== Mayor of Baguio ===
==== 1988–1989 ====
Labo was first elected as mayor of Baguio in 1988. However his eligibility was questioned. His short term focused on developing Baguio as a tourist destination and spent his own funds to help indigent communities and individuals.

The Supreme Court ruled that Labo is an Australian citizen at the time of election and that he has forfeited his Philippine citizenship when he underwent naturalization and took an oath of allegiance to the Australian government. The high court ruled that he is still an Australian citizen as far as Philippine jurisdiction is concerned. Labo is ordered to vacate his position.

Jaime Bugnosen took over the mayorship.

==== 1992 ====
Labo ran again and won the 1992 election but was disqualified again after the Supreme Court ruled he had failed to provide proof he has reacquired Philippine citizenship by the time of election day. Mauricio Domogan took over from Labo after Labo for four months de facto governed the city.

=== Other electoral bids ===
Labo ran for mayor in Dagupan in 2004 but lost. He likewise ran for Baguio mayor for the third time in 2007 under the Kilusang Bagong Lipunan. Questions over his citizenship was already reportedly been resolved by this time but he lost the city election.

He also filed for candidacy as Baguio mayor for 2013 as an independent candidate.

== Faith healing ==
Prior to being a politician, Labo was known as a faith healer claiming several influential figures to be among his clients including former president Ferdinand Marcos Sr.. He has practiced and promoted "psychic surgery" as a means to treat various illnesses.

Labo supposedly already possess such gift in his youth but denied it. He started practicing faith healing at age 44 or around 1978.

He maintained a clinic in Baguio and had patients flocked to him including people from overseas. He has also frequented Russia. In September 16, 1998 he was arrested in Moscow for 1,000 charges of swindling.

== Personal life ==
Labo married an Australian citizen in 1976. On July 28, 1976 he himself acquired Australian citizenship.

Labo married a Russian woman named Ilysabetha Coconachea who studied at the Saint Louis University in Baguio. However Labo filed an annulment case with Coconachea in 2006 in a court in Las Piñas following an incident that Coconachea found other women to be hiding at the conjugal residence in Labo's estate. The petition was still being heard as of 2009.
