= Mayor of Baguio =

Local chief executive of Baguio City, Philippines

- Punong Lungsod ng Baguio
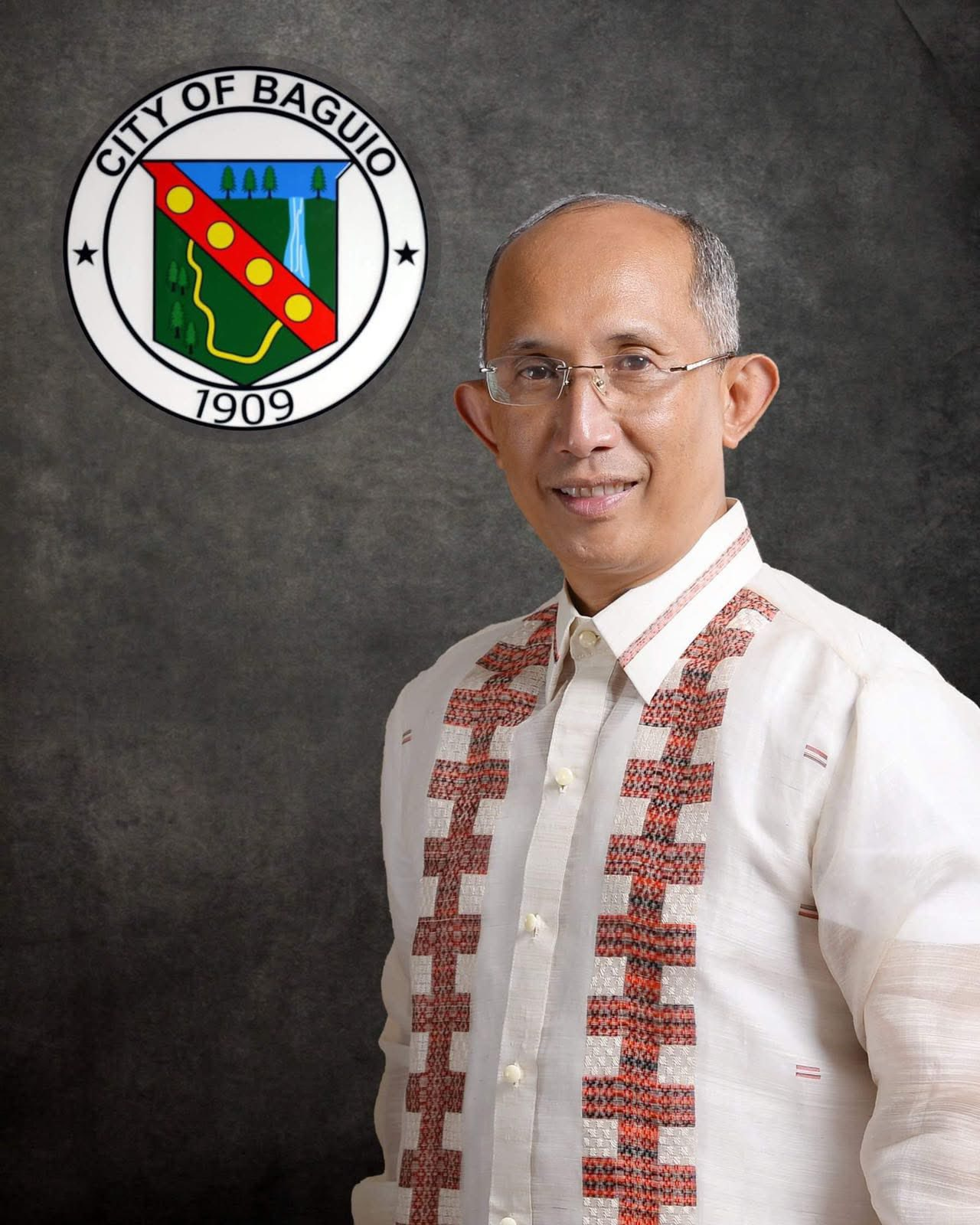
- Incumbent; Benjamin Magalong since June 30, 2019
- Style: The Honorable
- Seat: Baguio City Hall
- Appointer: Elected via popular vote
- Term length: 3 years (renewable twice; total three terms)
- Inaugural holder: E.W Reynold (under United States regime); Sergio Bayan (under Philippine Commonwealth)
- Formation: 1909
- Deputy: Vice Mayor
- Salary: ₱196,206 per month ₱2,354,472 per year (Note: On August 21, 1989, Republic Act No. 6758 directed the Department of Budget and Management (DBM) to establish and administer a unified Compensation and Position Classification System along lines specified in that Act. On March 14, 2007, President Gloria Macapagal Arroyo issued Executive Order No. 611 Department of Budget and Management (DBM) is hereby directed to implement a ten percent (10%) increase over the basic monthly salaries of civilian government personnel whose positions are covered by the Compensation and Position Classification System as of June 30, 2007, including the salaries of the President, Vice-President, Senators and members of the House of Representatives, but to take effect only after the expiration of the respective terms of office of the incumbent officials pursuant to Section 10 of Article VI and Section 6 of Article VII of the 1987 Constitution.)
- Website: https://new.baguio.gov.ph/home

The mayor of Baguio (Filipino: Punong Lungsod ng Baguio) is the chief executive of the government of Baguio, a highly urbanized city territorially located in Benguet and the regional center of the Cordillera Administrative Region, Philippines. The mayor leads the city's departments in executing ordinances and delivering public services and holds office at the Baguio City Hall. The mayor, like all local government executives, has a term of office of three years, but has a maximum electoral tenure of three consecutive terms. He is assisted by the City Vice Mayor. In case of death, resignation or incapacity, the vice mayor becomes the mayor.

== History ==
The Inaugural holder of the office is E.W. Reynolds having been appointed by the governor general. He served from September 1, 1909, to February 5, 1910. He was succeeded by E.A. Eckman, concurrently serving as lieutenant governor of the sub-province of Benguet. He would serve until 1913 when he was appointed as governor of Mountain Province. In February 1920, Eusebius Halsema was appointed as city mayor, as well as city engineer and district engineer of Benguet. He is best known for building the mountain trail to Bontoc, which was renamed in his honor, now known as Halsema Highway. He also undertook major infrastructure developments in the city, such as widening and paving roads, the construction of the Loakan airfield and the Asin Hydropower Plant. He would be longest serving and the last American mayor of Baguio, serving for more than 17 years.

On May 31, 1937, upon the resignation of Mayor Halsema, District Engineer of Mountain Province Sergio Bayan was appointed as mayor by President Manuel Quezon. He holds distinction as the first Filipino mayor of Baguio. Baguio saw its first-ever female mayor, Virginia Oteyza-de Guia, albeit in an acting capacity. She also holds the distinction as the first elected female councilor and first (and to date the only) female vice mayor of Baguio.

Baguio held its first elections in 1960, which saw its first elected mayor, Luis Lardizabal. Since the elections in 1960 which saw the first elected mayor of Baguio up to the present time, only two were appointed as mayor of Baguio, Mayors Bueno and Paraan. During the martial law years, President Ferdinand Marcos appointed Gen. Ernesto Bueno upon the expiration of Mayor Lardizabal's term in 1979. When the suspension on elections was lifted, Mayor Bueno ran and won in the subsequent 1980 elections. He would serve as mayor until his death in March 1986 due to a vehicular accident. Mayor Bueno's death, which coincided with the upheavals brought about by the People Power Revolution saw Col. Francisco Paraan appointed as mayor by President Cory Aquino.

In the 1988 elections that followed, Jun Labo, a well known faith healer during that time, won the race. He was, however, subsequently disqualified due to his citizenship. Vice Mayor Bugnosen was elevated to city mayor following Labo's disqualification. They would later face-off in the subsequent 1992 elections which would see Labo winning the mayoralty a second time around. Labo would again be disqualified in the same year, elevating Vice Mayor Mauricio Domogan to the mayoral post. Domogan would go on to become the longest serving mayor of the city, serving for almost 18 years, from 1992 to 2001 and again from 2010 to 2019.

In 2004, Councilor Braulio Yaranon, who was a retired judge and former city vice mayor won the mayoral post, beating incumbent mayor Bernardo Vergara. Mayor Yaranon would face suspension in 2006 due to issues stemming from a complaint filed by a private parking company operating in the city. Vice Mayor Reinaldo Bautista Jr. would take his oath as acting city mayor. The two would later go head to head in the 2007 elections, where Bautista would defeat Yaranon for the post.

The incumbent mayor is Benjamin Magalong, a retired police general well known for heading the Mamasapano board of inquiry in 2015.

== List ==
This is a list of the city mayors of Baguio.

No.	Image	Name (Birth-Death)	Party	Term began	Term ended	Vice Mayor
American regime Appointed Mayors (1909 to 1937)
1		E.W. Reynolds		September 1, 1909	February 5, 1910	William M. Haube
2		Elmer A. Eckman		February 5, 1910	January 28, 1913	Robb White
2		Elmer A. Eckman		February 5, 1910	January 28, 1913	L.H. Reithinger
3		A.D. Williams		May 24, 1913	May 16, 1918	C.P. Hatheway(acting)
3		A.D. Williams		May 24, 1913	May 16, 1918	F.W. Darrah
3		A.D. Williams		May 24, 1913	May 16, 1918	Henry M. Bankhead
3		A.D. Williams		May 24, 1913	May 16, 1918	R.E. Fisher
3		A.D. Williams		May 24, 1913	May 16, 1918	John H. Neff
4		Charles S. Dandois		June 10, 1918	December 28, 1919	John H. Neff
4		Charles S. Dandois		June 10, 1918	December 28, 1919	Alfred Ballin
4		Charles S. Dandois		June 10, 1918	December 28, 1919	Walter L. Clark
5		Eusebius J. Halsema (1882-1945)		February 7, 1920	May 31, 1937	Walter L. Clark
5		Eusebius J. Halsema (1882-1945)		February 7, 1920	May 31, 1937	E.F. Taggart
5		Eusebius J. Halsema (1882-1945)		February 7, 1920	May 31, 1937	Emil Speth
Philippine Commonwealth Appointed Mayors (1937 to 1946)
6		Sergio Bayan	Nacionalista	June 1, 1937	September 11, 1939	Emil Speth
7		Nicasio S. Valderrosa (1891-1968)	Nacionalista	October 27, 1939	May 3, 1944	Emil Speth
8		Ramon P. Mitra (1898-1978)	Nacionalista	May 4, 1944	March 17, 1945	
9		Placido L. Mapa (1901-1967)	Nacionalista	March 23, 1945	November 4, 1945	Lucas Paredes
10		Isidoro Siapno	Nacionalista	November 5, 1945	December 23, 1945	Pedro Armeña
—		Pedro Armeña (Acting)	Nacionalista	December 31, 1945	July 4, 1946	Pedro Armeña
Philippine Republic Appointed Mayors (1946 to 1960)
—		Virginia Oteyza-de Guia (Acting) (1917-2015)	Liberal	July 20, 1946	July 30, 1946	Virginia O. de Guia
11		Dr. Jose Cariño ^{1} (1892-1950)	Liberal	July 30, 1946	April 8, 1950	Virginia O. de Guia
—		Virginia Oteyza-de Guia (Acting) (1917-2015)	Liberal	November 7, 1949	March 31, 1950	Virginia O. de Guia
12		Luis P. Torres	Liberal	April 11, 1950	February 15, 1951	Virginia O. de Guia
—		Virginia Oteyza-de Guia (Acting) (1917-2015)	Liberal	August 15, 1950	August 15, 1950	Virginia O. de Guia
—		Gil Mallare (Acting) (1908-?)	Liberal	February 16, 1951	April 2, 1951	Virginia O. de Guia
—		Francisco I. Ortega (Acting) (1904-1967)	Liberal	April 3, 1951	January 12, 1952	Virginia O. de Guia
—		Virginia Oteyza-de Guia (Acting) (1917-2015)	Liberal	January 12, 1952	January 14, 1952	Virginia O. de Guia
13*		Gil R. Mallare (1908-?)	Liberal	January 14, 1952	July 7, 1953	Virginia O. de Guia
13*		Gil R. Mallare (1908-?)	Liberal	January 14, 1952	July 7, 1953	Patricio C. Perez
14		Benito H. Lopez (1908-1988)	Liberal	July 10, 1953	December 21, 1953	Patricio C. Perez
13*		Gil R. Mallare (1908-?)	Liberal	December 22, 1953	January 10, 1954	Carlos R. Lazo
15		Alfonso Tabora (1900-1966)	Nacionalista	January 11, 1954	December 30, 1959	Carlos R. Lazo
15		Alfonso Tabora (1900-1966)	Nacionalista	January 11, 1954	December 30, 1959	Bienvenido R. Yandoc
16		Bienvenido R. Yandoc (1900-?)	Nacionalista	January 4, 1960	February 27, 1960	
Philippine Republic Elected Mayors (1960 to present)
17*		Luis L. Lardizabal (1914-2004)	Nacionalista	March 1, 1960	December 30, 1963	Norberto F. de Guzman
18		Norberto F. de Guzman (1910-?)	Liberal	December 30, 1963	December 30, 1967	Braulio D. Yaranon
17*		Luis L. Lardizabal (1914-2004)	Nacionalista	December 30, 1967	December 30, 1971	Sinforoso Fangonil
17*		Luis L. Lardizabal (1914-2004)	Nacionalista	December 30, 1971	December 27, 1979	Sinforoso Fangonil
19		Ernesto H. Bueno ^{1} (1926-1986)	KBL	December 27, 1979	January 30, 1980	Antonio Romero ^{1}
19		Ernesto H. Bueno ^{1} (1926-1986)	KBL	January 30, 1980	March 16, 1986	Antonio Romero ^{1}
19		Ernesto H. Bueno ^{1} (1926-1986)	KBL	January 30, 1980	March 16, 1986	Jaime R. Bugnosen ^{2}
20		Francisco A. Paraan (1917-2009)	UNIDO	March 16, 1986	January 31, 1988	Reynaldo A. Cortes
21*		Jun Labo ^{2} (born 1934)	Lakas	February 2, 1988	October 15, 1989	Jaime R. Bugnosen
22		Jaime R. Bugnosen ^{3} (1927-2017)	Lakas	October 15, 1989	June 30, 1992	Antonio Tabora Jr.
21*		Jun Labo ^{4} (born 1934)	Independent	June 30, 1992	October 24, 1992	Mauricio G. Domogan
23*		Mauricio G. Domogan ^{3} (born 1946)	PRP	October 24, 1992	June 30, 1995	Daniel T. Fariñas ^{3}
23*		Mauricio G. Domogan ^{3} (born 1946)	PRP	June 30, 1995	June 30, 1998	Daniel T. Fariñas ^{3}
23*		Mauricio G. Domogan ^{3} (born 1946)	Lakas	June 30, 1998	June 30, 2001	Daniel T. Fariñas ^{3}
24		Bernardo M. Vergara (born 1937)	Lakas	June 30, 2001	June 30, 2004	Betty Lourdes F. Tabanda
25		Braulio D. Yaranon ^{5} (1926-2017)	LDP	June 30, 2004	August 31, 2006	Reinaldo A. Bautista Jr.
26		Reinaldo A. Bautista, Jr. ^{6}	LDP	August 31, 2006	June 30, 2007	Leandro Yangot Jr. ^{2}
26		Reinaldo A. Bautista, Jr. ^{6}	Lakas	June 30, 2007	June 30, 2010	Daniel T. Fariñas ^{1}
23*		Mauricio G. Domogan (born 1946)	Lakas	June 30, 2010	June 30, 2013	Daniel T. Fariñas ^{1}
23*		Mauricio G. Domogan (born 1946)	UNA	June 30, 2013	June 30, 2016	Daniel T. Fariñas ^{1}
23*		Mauricio G. Domogan (born 1946)	UNA	June 30, 2013	June 30, 2016	Edison R. Bilog ^{4}
23*		Mauricio G. Domogan (born 1946)	UNA	June 30, 2016	June 30, 2019	Edison R. Bilog ^{4}
27		Benjamin B. Magalong (born 1960)	NPC	June 30, 2019	June 30, 2022	Faustino A. Olowan
27		Benjamin B. Magalong (born 1960)	NPC	June 30, 2022	June 30, 2025	Faustino A. Olowan
27		Benjamin B. Magalong (born 1960)	NPC	June 30, 2025	Present	Faustino A. Olowan

Notes on the mayors
^{1} Died in office.
^{2} Subsequently disqualified in 1989
^{3} Elevated to city mayor
^{4} Subsequently disqualified in 1992
^{5} Suspended for one year
^{6} Served as acting mayor until 2006. Won the subsequent 2007 elections.

Notes on the vice mayors
^{1} Died in office.
^{2} Elevated to city vice mayor
^{3} Elevated to city vice mayor in 1992. Won subsequent vice mayoral elections in 1995 and 1998.
^{4} Elevated to city vice mayor. Subsequently won as vice mayor in 2016.

== Elections ==
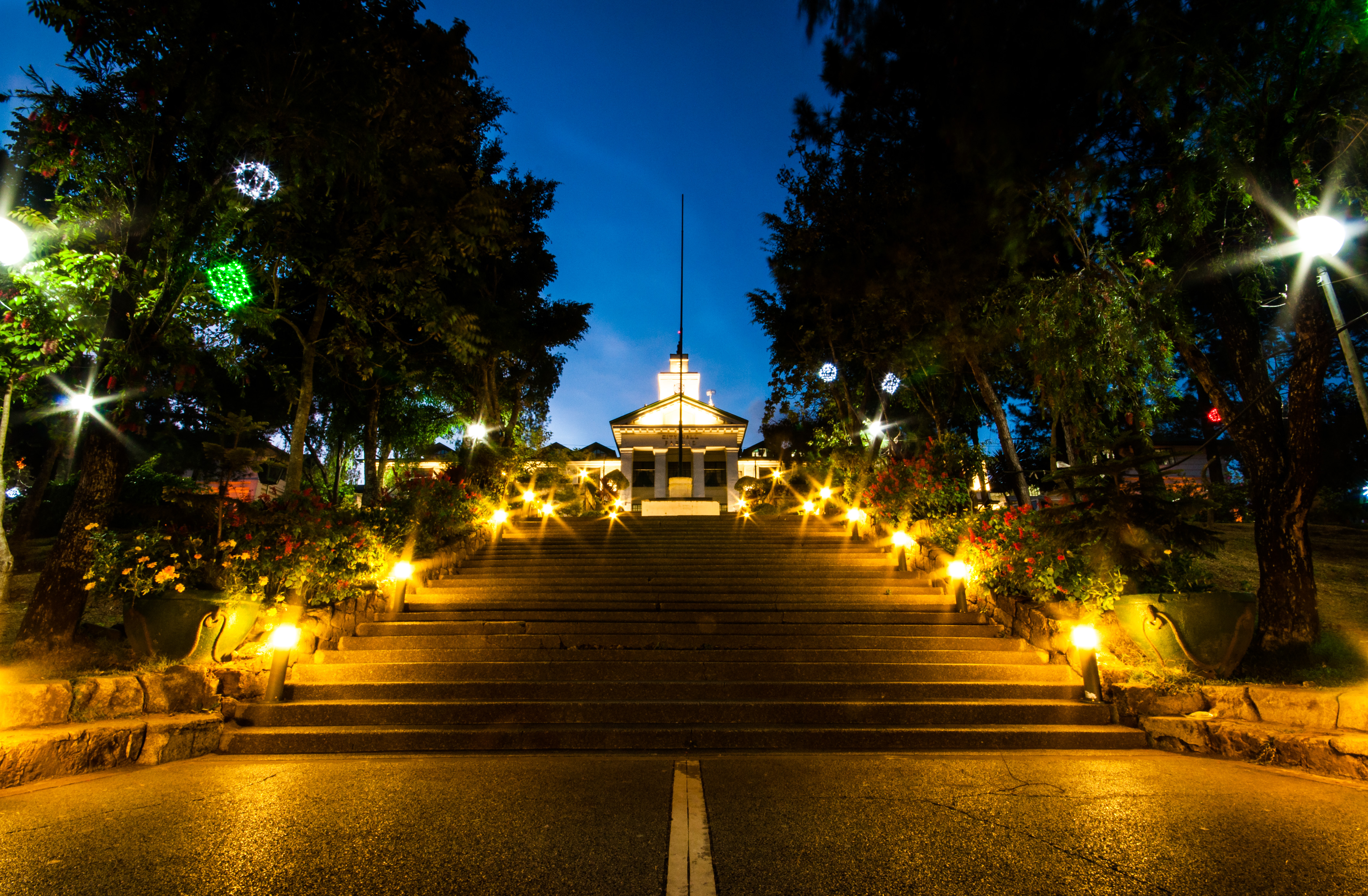
The City Hall of Baguio at night

- 1959 Baguio local elections
- 1963 Baguio local elections
- 1967 Baguio local elections
- 1971 Baguio local elections
- 1980 Baguio local elections
- 1988 Baguio local elections
- 1992 Baguio local elections
- 1995 Baguio local elections
- 1998 Baguio local elections
- 2001 Baguio local elections
- 2004 Baguio local elections
- 2007 Baguio local elections
- 2010 Baguio local elections
- 2013 Baguio local elections
- 2016 Baguio local elections
- 2019 Baguio local elections
- 2022 Baguio local elections
- 2025 Baguio local elections

== Vice Mayor ==
The Vice Mayor is the second-highest official of the city The vice mayor is elected via popular vote; although most mayoral candidates have running mates, the vice mayor is elected separately from the mayor. This can result in the mayor and the vice mayor coming from different political parties.

The Vice Mayor is the presiding officer of the 14-man Baguio City Council, and he can only vote in case of a tiebreaker. If the mayor dies or is either suspended or removed from office, the vice mayor assumes the functions as city mayor and serve out his remaining term until the next election.

In case that the vice mayor dies while in office or is either removed or suspended, his duties will be carried out by the No.1 councilor, which is the councilor who garnered the most votes in the immediately preceding election.

The Vice Mayor is currently Faustino A. Olowan since June 30, 2019.
