= Braulio Yaranon =

Filipino politician

The Honorable Braulio Yaranon

25th Mayor of Baguio
- In office June 30, 2004 – August 31, 2006
- Vice Mayor: Reinaldo Bautista
- Preceded by: Bernardo Vergara
- Succeeded by: Reinaldo Bautista

Vice Mayor of Baguio
- In office December 30, 1963 – December 30, 1967
- Mayor: Norberto de Guzman
- Preceded by: Norberto de Guzman
- Succeeded by: Sinforoso Fangonil

Member of the Baguio City Council
- In office June 30, 1998 – June 30, 2004
- In office December 30, 1959 – December 30, 1963

Personal details
- Born: April 16, 1927 Aringay, La Union, Philippine Islands, U.S.
- Died: May 15, 2017 (aged 90) Baguio, Philippines
- Party: LDP
- Spouse: Lilia Guirnalda
- Children: 4
- Education: University of the Philippines College of Law

Braulio Dacanay Yaranon (April 16, 1927 – May 15, 2017) was a Filipino politician who was elected to serve as mayor of Baguio for a three-year term beginning in 2004. Suspended from office in 2006, he was defeated for re-election in 2007.

== Background ==
Yaranon originally hailed from Aringay, La Union. A graduate of the University of the Philippines College of Law, he was admitted as a lawyer to the Philippine bar in 1954. He became Baguio city secretary in 1955 to 1959. Yaranon was elected as Baguio city councilor from 1960 to 1963. In 1964, he was elected as the Baguio vice mayor. He was Baguio city judge from 1980 to 1987. From 1987 to 1997 he was the executive judge in the regional trial court in San Fernando, La Union. After his retirement from the judiciary, he was elected as a city councilor for Baguio.

== Mayor of Baguio ==
Yaranon was elected to his first term as mayor of Baguio in 2004, defeating the incumbent, Bernardo Vergara. Yaranon successfully campaigned on a platform that stressed environmental issues, clean government, and opposition to the collection of parking fees in Baguio streets. Nonetheless, Yaranon's term was marred by controversies. In 2005, Yaranon was cited for direct contempt by the Supreme Court for defying a writ of injunction issued by the high court in relation to the controversy on the collection of parking fees in Baguio. A petition for his recall as mayor was soon initiated. It was also during Yaranon's term that a limited outbreak of meningococcemia in Baguio dampened tourism during the usually busy summer months.

In late June 2006, Yaranon was ordered suspended for one year (until June 30, 2007) by the Office of the President, on charges of grave misconduct and abuse of authority filed by a private pay-parking company operating in Baguio. Yaranon appealed the ruling, which he insisted was not yet final. Nonetheless, Baguio Vice-Mayor Reinaldo Bautista took his oath of office as "acting mayor" on July 20, 2006. Yaranon refused to step aside for Bautista. Despite his suspension from office, Yaranon sought re-election as mayor in the May 2007 general elections. He was defeated by Bautista.
