= 2019 Baguio local elections =

16th Mayoral elections in Baguio

2019 Baguio mayoral election
- May 13, 2019
- Registered: 164,125
- Turnout: 113,899 (69.39%) ▼9.04p.p.
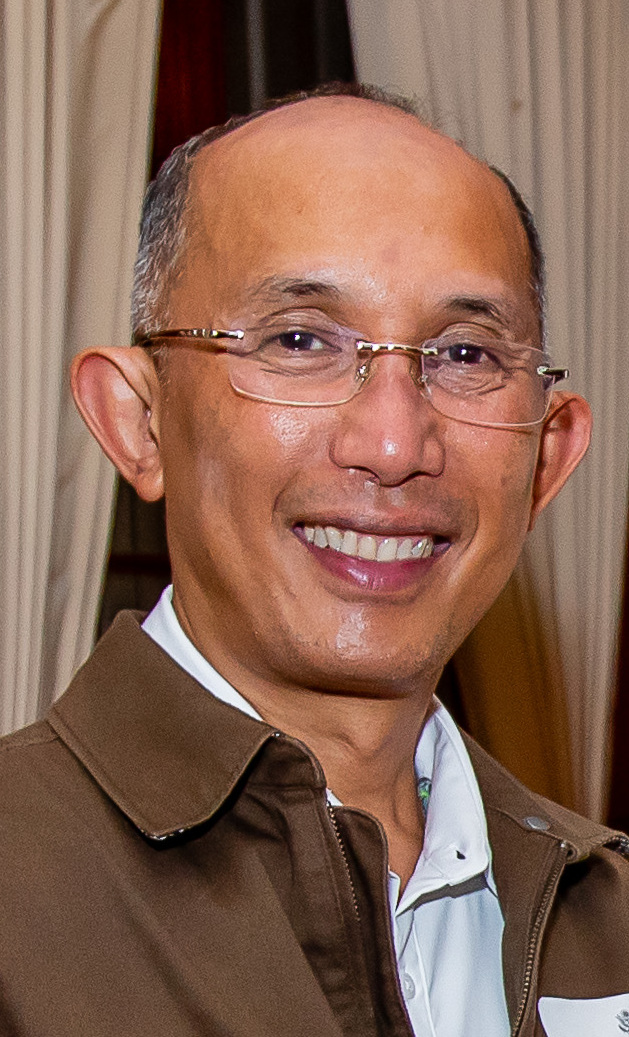

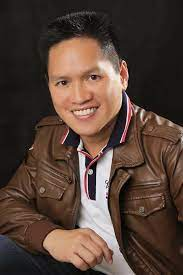

Nominee	Benjamin Magalong	Edison Bilog	Edgar Avila
Party	NPC	PDP–Laban	UNA
Running mate	N/A	Faustino Olowan	Elmer Datuin
Popular vote	41,482	22,670	17,360
Percentage	37.29	20.38	15.61
Nominee	Jose Molintas	Leandro Yangot Jr.	Tony Boy Tabora
Party	Liberal	PFP	Lakas
Running mate	Rene Cortes	Michael Lawana	N/A
Popular vote	13,562	12,635	2,805
Percentage	12.19	11.36	2.52
Mayor before election
Mauricio Domogan
UNA
Elected mayor
Benjamin Magalong
NPC
- Vice mayoral election
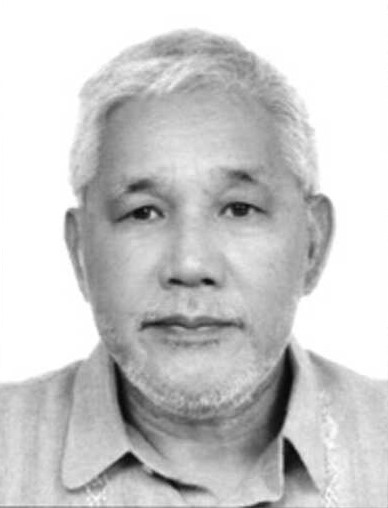
Candidate	Faustino Olowan	Michael Lawana	Peter Fianza
Party	PDP–Laban	PFP	Independent
Popular vote	40,224	24,142	19,585
Percentage	37.28%	22.37%	18.15%
Vice Mayor before election
Edison Bilog
PDP–Laban
Elected Vice Mayor
Faustino Olowan
PDP–Laban

Local elections were held in Baguio on Monday, May 13, 2019, as a part of the 2019 Philippine general election. Voters elected candidates for the local elective posts in the city: the mayor, vice mayor, the congressman, and the twelve councilors

Retired police general Benjamin Magalong won the mayoralty race, beating outgoing vice mayor Edison Bilog, while outgoing mayor Mauricio Domogan lost to incumbent representative Mark Go, marking the first defeat in his political career.

There are a total of 113,899 people who voted out of the 164,125 registered voters.

== Mayoral and Vice Mayoral elections ==
=== Mayor ===
Incumbent mayor Mauricio Domogan is ineligible to run for a fourth term. He ran for the lone congressional seat.

Baguio mayoral election
Party	Candidate	Votes	%
NPC	Benjamin Magalong	41,482	37.29
PDP–Laban	Edison Bilog	22,670	20.38
UNA	Edgar Avila	17,360	15.61
Liberal	Jose Molintas	13,562	12.19
PFP	Leandro Yangot Jr.	12,635	11.36
Lakas	Tony Boy Tabora	2,805	2.52
Independent	Benny Alhambra	378	0.34
Independent	Labio Calingayan	281	0.25
Independent	Jeffrey Pinic	65	0.06
Valid ballots		111,238	97.66
Invalid or blank votes		2,661	2.34
Total votes		113,899	100.00
NPC gain from UNA			

=== Vice Mayor ===
Incumbent vice mayor Edison Bilog is not term-limited but is running for City Mayor.

Baguio vice mayoral election
Party	Candidate	Votes	%
PDP–Laban	Faustino Olowan	40,224	37.28
PFP	Michael Lawana	24,142	22.37
Independent	Peter Fianza	19,585	18.15
UNA	Elmer Datuin	18,617	17.25
Liberal	Rene Cortes	4,549	4.22
Independent	Felizardo Garcia	785	0.73
Valid ballots		107,902	94.73
Invalid or blank votes		5,997	5.27
Total votes		113,899	100.00
PDP–Laban hold			

== District representative ==
Incumbent Representative Mark Go is running for a second term.

2019 Philippine House of Representatives election in Lone District of Baguio
Party	Candidate	Votes	%
Nacionalista	Mark Go	58,603	52.65
UNA	Mauricio Domogan	30,443	27.35
Liberal	Nicasio Aliping Jr.	17,134	15.39
Lakas	Peter Rey Bautista	4,447	3.99
PDDS	Rafael Wasan	689	0.62
Valid ballots		111,316	97.73
Invalid or blank votes		2,583	2.27
Total votes		111,316	100.00
Nacionalista hold			

== City Council ==
The 12 of 14 members of the Baguio City Council are elected at-large via multiple non-transferable vote, where each voter has 12 votes, and can vote up to 12 candidates. The 12 candidates with the highest number of votes are elected.

The other 2 members are elected in indirect elections from the results of barangay elections.

Party	Seats
Liberal Party	3
Nacionalista Party	1
National Unity Party	1
Partido Demokratiko Pilipino-Lakas ng Bayan	2
United Nationalist Alliance	5
Ex officio seats	2
Total	14

Here is a list of candidates.

Baguio City Council Election
Party	Candidate	Votes	%
PDP–Laban	Joel Alangsab	51,323	45.06
UNA	Benny Bomogao	50,577	44.41
UNA	Betty Lourdes Tabanda	48,826	42.87
PDP–Laban	Elaine Sembrano	47,150	41.40
Liberal	Maria Mylen Victoria Yaranon	47,054	41.31
Liberal	Isabelo Cosalan Jr.	47,050	41.31
UNA	Francisco Roberto Ortega	44,018	38.65
Liberal	Arthur Allad-iw	42,022	36.89
UNA	Vladimir Cayabas	41,291	36.25
NUP	Fred Bagbagen	38,048	33.41
UNA	Lilia Fariñas	37,013	32.50
Nacionalista	Philian Louise Allan Weygan	32,368	28.42
UNA	Villamor Bumanglag	31,193	27.39
NPC	Jonathan Vergara	30,672	26.93
UNA	Ryan Dale Mangusan	30,033	26.37
Nacionalista	Grace Mayos	28,753	25.24
Liberal	Richard Cariño	27,967	24.55
Liberal	Ronald Perez	24,273	21.31
UNA	Esteban Somngi	20,964	18.41
UNA	Marvin Yang-Ed	20,286	17.81
PDP–Laban	John Glenn Gaerlan	19,671	17.27
PFP	Gueliro Sugano	17,546	15.40
UNA	Christian Villareal	17,270	15.16
PDP–Laban	Zosimo Abratique	17,266	15.16
PDP–Laban	Thomas Dumalti	16,130	14.16
Nacionalista	Ricardo Bagalawis	14,967	13.14
PDP–Laban	Angeline Pamela Cariño	14,925	13.10
UNA	Basilio Binay-An	12,376	10.87
Nacionalista	Edgar Allan Beltran	11,578	10.17
Independent	Marvin Herrera	11,226	9.86
PDP–Laban	Erickson Ferrer	10,938	9.60
UNA	Connie Tongawan	10,043	8.82
NPC	Teodorico Tan	9,346	8.21
Liberal	Victor Jimenez	9,277	8.14
PFP	Nicanor Nialla	8,856	7.54
PFP	Mario De Los Reyes	8,486	7.45
PFP	Florentino Fariñas	8,352	7.33
PFP	Caesar Malicdan	7,764	6.82
Liberal	Antolen Mascariñas	6,983	6.13
PFP	Gitwa Carpio	6,647	5.84
PFP	Robin Coteng	6,490	5.70
PDP–Laban	Gerry Uy	6,338	5.56
Lakas	Aurora Alambra	6,179	5.42
PFP	Freneil Reyes	5,695	5.00
CDP	Guillermo Hernandez	4,458	3.91
Independent	Lalaine Estolas	3,747	3.29
Independent	Philip Canuto	3,499	3.07
Independent	Edilberto Gapuz	3,159	2.77
PFP	Bernardo Romulo Ellamil	3,095	2.72
Independent	Jan Henric Liquete	2,903	2.55
Independent	Gordon Monserrate	2,219	1.95
PFP	Amy Mondero	1,991	1.75
Total votes		113,899	100.00
