= Mauricio Domogan =

Filipino lawyer & politician (born 1946)

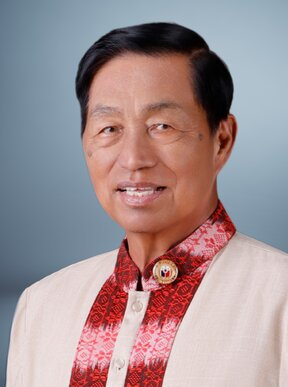
- Official portrait, 2025

Member of the Philippine House of Representatives from Baguio's Lone District
- Incumbent
- Assumed office June 30, 2025
- Preceded by: Mark Go
- In office June 30, 2001 – June 30, 2010
- Preceded by: Bernardo Vergara
- Succeeded by: Bernardo Vergara

23rd Mayor of Baguio
- In office June 30, 2010 – June 30, 2019
- Vice Mayor: Daniel T. Farinas (2010–2014); Edison R. Bilog (2014–2019)
- Preceded by: Reinaldo Bautista
- Succeeded by: Benjamin Magalong
- In office October 24, 1992 – June 30, 2001
- Vice Mayor: Daniel T. Farinas
- Preceded by: Jun Labo
- Succeeded by: Bernardo Vergara

Vice Mayor of Baguio
- In office June 30, 1992 – October 24, 1992
- Mayor: Jun Labo
- Preceded by: Antonio Tabora Jr.
- Succeeded by: Daniel T. Farinas

Member of the Baguio Municipal Council
- In office June 30, 1988 – June 30, 1992

Personal details
- Born: October 10, 1946 (age 80) Quirino, Ilocos Sur, Philippines
- Party: Lakas (1998–2012; 2021–2024; 2025–present); Timpuyog Ti Baguio (local party)
- Other political affiliations: Independent (2024–2025); UNA (2012–2021); PRP (1992–1998)
- Spouse: Rebecca "Becky" Napeek
- Children: 3
- Education: University of Baguio (BA); University of the Cordilleras (LL.B)
- Occupation: Politician
- Profession: Lawyer

Mauricio "Morris" Gamsao Domogan (born October 10, 1946) is a Filipino lawyer and politician who has been the representative for Baguio's at-large district since 2025, previously holding the seat from 2001 to 2010. The longest-serving mayor of Baguio, he served as the chief executive of the city from 1992 to 2001 and from 2010 to 2019.

An Igorot of the Bago ethnic group, Domogan pursued legal studies at the University of the Cordilleras and practiced law from 1974 to 1992. He entered politics in 1988, when he was elected to the Baguio City Council. He was elected vice mayor in 1992 and acceded to the mayoralty later that year after the disqualification of Mayor Jun Labo from office. His early tenure was marked by the city's continued response to the July 16, 1990, earthquake.

== Early life and career ==
Domogan was born on October 10, 1946, and traces his roots to the remote sitio of Bab-asig, Patiacan, Quirino (formerly Angaki), Ilocos Sur, and within the boundaries of Besao, Mountain Province, and Tubo, Abra. He is an Igorot of the Bago tribe.

He finished his elementary education at the Patiacan Elementary School in 1961 and finished his secondary education at the Lepanto High School. He obtained his BA degree from the University of Baguio in 1969 and finished his Bachelor of Laws at the University of the Cordilleras in 1973.

Before his political career, he was a private practitioner from 1974 to 1992, focusing on labor issues and was counsel to several unions, including the Hyatt Terraces Employees Union and Baguio Country Club Employees Union.

== Early political career ==
Domogan began his political career as a councilor of Baguio from 1988 to 1992. He was later elected as Vice Mayor of Baguio in May 1992 but assumed the position of acting mayor of the city 15 minutes after taking his oath as vice mayor. He served as acting mayor from July 1, 1992 to October 24, 1992, and he assumed the office of the city mayor by virtue of the disqualification of then-elected mayor Jun Labo, who was disqualified by the Supreme Court due to his Australian citizenship.

== Mayor of Baguio (1992–2001; 2010–2019) ==
Domogan’s first term was marked by the task of rehabilitating the city after the July 16, 1990, earthquake in cooperation with then Congressman Bernardo Vergara, the other city officials, city residents, and national leadership. Massive reconstructions of the city roads, buildings and other infrastructures continued during his second and third terms.

These included the modernization of Marcos Highway, the Baguio-Tuba-Itogon-Sablan-La Trinidad (BLIST) circumferential road, and Naguilian Road, the repair, rerouting, declogging and construction of the drainage system of the City Camp Lagoon, among others. In addition, Mayor Domogan orchestrated the twin drive of cleaning and greening the city, which led to the city earning the title of "Cleanest and Greenest Highly Urbanized City" in the country for three consecutive years, elevating the city to the Hall of Fame Award category with a total monetary award of 5 million pesos, which was used to purchase garbage trucks. Moreover, Mayor Domogan was able to lead the city in garnering the highest award that the national government could bestow to a local government unit, namely, the Gawad Pamana ng Lahi Award for two consecutive years, thereby elevating the city, once again, to the Hall of Fame Award category.

Being barred by the constitution from running for a fourth consecutive term in Congress, he decided to reclaim his post as Mayor of Baguio for the 2010 election. He successfully reclaimed the office. He was again re-elected in 2013 and 2016.

== Congressional bids ==
Being barred from running for a fourth consecutive term as mayor, he instead ran as congressman for the Lone District of Baguio in 2001.

In 2019, after being term-limited as mayor, he ran for Congress. He lost his bid to incumbent congressman Mark Go, marking his first loss in his political career.

He ran again in 2025, winning with 45,767 votes (35.68%), defeating Isabelo Cosalan Jr. (PFP) who received 32,690 votes (25.49%).

== House of Representatives (2001-2010; 2025–present) ==
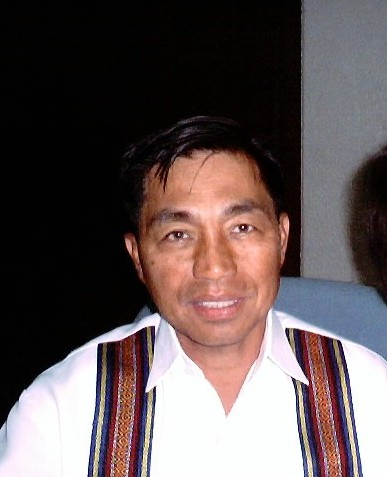
Domogan in 2005

During the 12th Congress, Congressman Domogan was able to file twenty (20) bills as main author and fifty (50) bills as co-author. Eleven of these bills have become laws of the land (Republic Acts). part of his Priority Development Assistance Fund (PDAF), was devoted to programmed projects benefiting his constituents in the Barangays, public schools, poor but deserving students, indigent patients, livelihood projects, and computerization program on a continuing basis for elementary and high school of Baguio.

Knowing the problems of the City during the rainy months, he prioritized the dredging, revitalization and construction of the drainage system in the central business district, thus effectively solving the age-old problem of flooding at the foot of Session Road as well as the rehabilitation and repair of the biggest drainage system of the City from the Athletic Swimming Pool to the Rabbit Sink Hole. Cognizant of the City as a tourists destination, he campaigned to entice more visitors to come to Baguio. He Supported the Baguio City Police Office in its security concerns to provide a safe haven to tourists in the City. He provided the impetus to successful tourists-oriented activities such as the Panagbenga Flower Festival, Salad Bowl Festival, and the Summer Vacation Activities.

House of Representatives of the Philippines
Preceded by Bernardo Vergara	Representative, Lone District of Baguio; 2001–2010	Succeeded by Bernardo Vergara
Preceded by Reinaldo Bautista Jr.	Mayor of Baguio; 2010–2019	Succeeded by Benjamin Magalong
