= 2016 Philippine gubernatorial elections =

- May 9, 2016

All 81 provincial governorships
	First party	Second party	Third party
Party	Liberal	NPC	NUP
Last election	33	13	8
Seats before	40	8	9
Seats after	39	9	9
Seat change	▼1	▲1	Steady
	Fourth party	Fifth party	Sixth party
Party	Nacionalista	UNA	Aksyon
Last election	6	3	0
Seats before	8	4	1
Seats after	9	3	1
Seat change	▲1	▼1	Steady
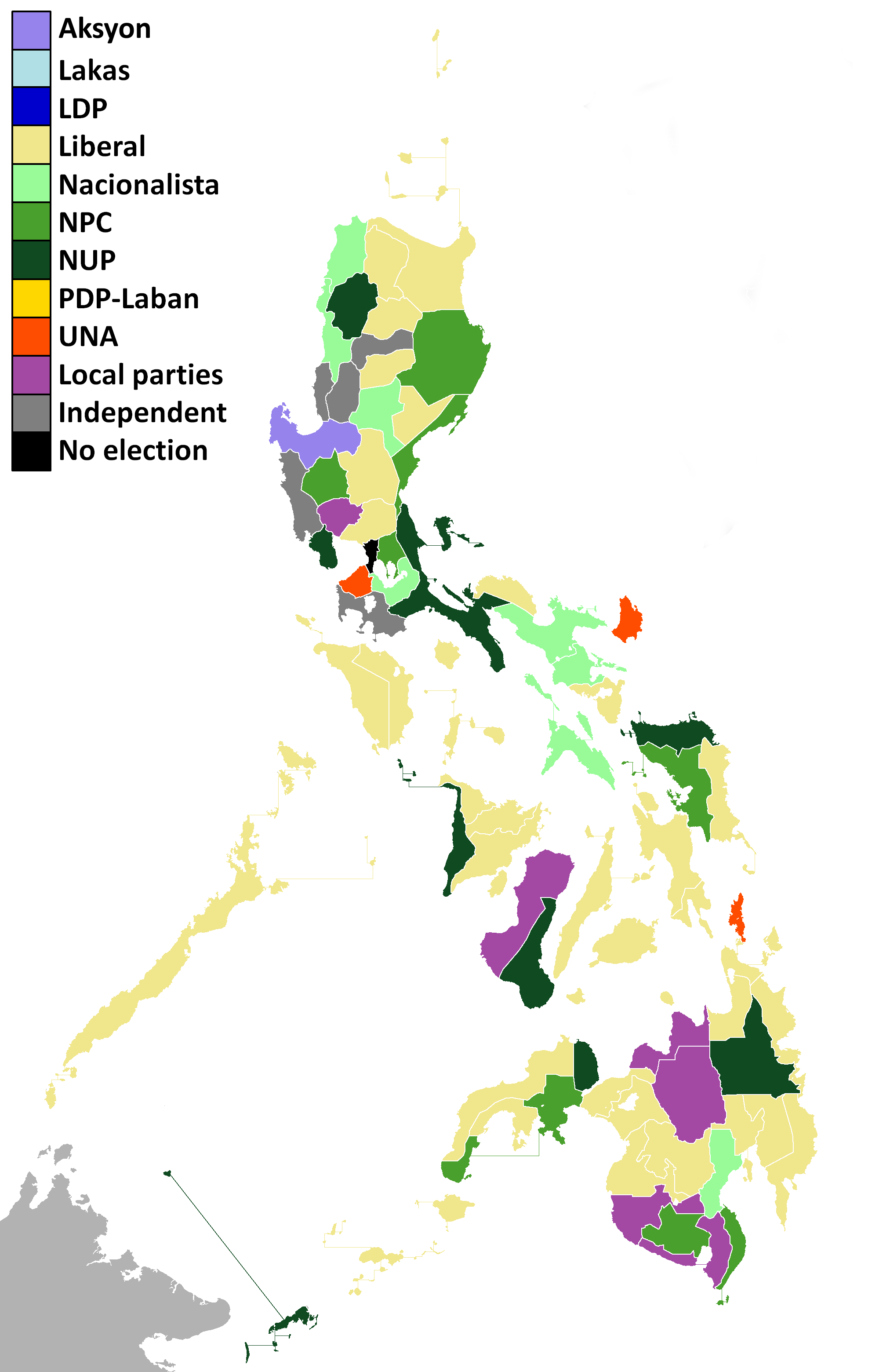
- Results of the election
President of the League of Provinces of the Philippines before election
Alfonso Umali Jr. (Oriental Mindoro)
Liberal
Elected President of the League of Provinces of the Philippines
Ryan Luis Singson (Ilocos Sur)
Nacionalista

Gubernatorial elections were held in the Philippines on May 9, 2016. All provinces elected their provincial governors for three-year terms, who will be inaugurated on June 30, 2016, after their proclamation. Governors that are currently serving their third consecutive terms are prohibited from running as governors (they may run for any other posts however).

Metro Manila and highly urbanized cities and independent component cities such as Angeles City, Cebu City and Davao City are outside the jurisdiction of any province and thus would not run elections for governors of their mother provinces (Pampanga, Cebu and Davao del Sur respectively). These would elect mayors instead.

Davao Occidental held its first gubernatorial election on this day.

== Summary ==
Party	2013 elections	Before elections	Gains	Holds	Losses	Total	%	Change (vs. before)
Liberal	38	40	4	35	5	39	48.1%	▼1
NPC	13	8	1	8	0	9	11.1%	▲1
NUP	8	9	2	7	2	9	11.1%	Steady
Nacionalista	6	8	2	7	1	9	11.1%	▲1
UNA	3	4	2	1	2	3	3.7%	▼1
Aksyon	0	1	0	1	0	1	1.2%	Steady
Lakas	1	1	0	0	1	0	0.0%	▼1
Local parties	4	7	0	6	1	6	7.4%	▼1
Independent	6	2	3	2	0	5	6.2%	▲3
Totals	80	80	14	67	13	81	100%	▲1

== Luzon ==
=== Ilocos Region ===
==== Ilocos Norte ====
Incumbent governor Imee Marcos is running for reelection unopposed.

Ilocos Norte gubernatorial election
Party	Candidate	Votes	%
Nacionalista	Imee Marcos (incumbent)	279,144	100.00
Total votes		279,144	100.00
Nacionalista hold			

==== Ilocos Sur ====
Incumbent governor Ryan Luis Singson is running for reelection unopposed.

Ilocos Sur gubernatorial election
Party	Candidate	Votes	%
Nacionalista	Ryan Luis Singson (incumbent)	281,287	100.00
Total votes		281,287	100.00
Nacionalista hold			

==== La Union ====
Incumbent governor Manuel Ortega is term limited.

La Union (Note: Incumbent governor Manuel Ortega is term limited.) gubernatorial election
Party	Candidate	Votes	%
Independent	Francisco Ortega III	171,863	
KBL	Mario Eduardo Ortega	133,028	
Independent	Henry Bacurnay	43,613	
NUP	Thomas Dumpit	16,028	
Independent	Clark Field Arroño III	706	
Total votes		365,238	100.00

==== Pangasinan ====
Incumbent governor Amado Espino, Jr. is term limited.

Pangasinan (Note: Incumbent governor Amado Espino, Jr. is term limited and is running for congressman. His son, incumbent LMB President Amado Espino III is running in his place.) gubernatorial election
Party	Candidate	Votes	%
Aksyon	Amado Espino III	736,909	
NPC	Mark Cojuangco	513,897	
Independent	Zaldy Salvador	6,773	
Total votes		1,257,579	100.00

=== Cagayan Valley ===
==== Batanes ====
Incumbent Vicente Gato is running for reelection.

Batanes gubernatorial election
Party	Candidate	Votes	%
Liberal	Marilou Cayco	3,418	
NPC	Telesforo Castillejos	2,760	
UNA	Vicente Gato (incumbent)	1,963	
Independent	Demy Narag	1,004	
Total votes		9,145	100.00

==== Cagayan ====
Incumbent governor Alvaro Antonio is term limited.

Cagayan (Note: Incumbent governor Alvaro Antonio is term limited. Her daughter, Cristina Antonio is running in his place.) gubernatorial election
Party	Candidate	Votes	%
Liberal	Manuel Mamba	177,219	
UNA	Atty. Cristine Antonio	160,899	
Nacionalista	Leonides Fausto	124,161	
KBL	Rodel Gerez	1,638	
Total votes		463,917	100.00

==== Isabela ====
Incumbent governor Faustino Dy III is running for reelection.

Isabela gubernatorial election
Party	Candidate	Votes	%
NPC	Faustino Dy III (incumbent)	451,766	
Independent	Grace Padaca	142,822	
Independent	Antonio Aliangan	3,584	
Independent	Lilia Uy	1,995	
Total votes		600,167	100.00

==== Nueva Vizcaya ====
Incumbent governor Ruth Padilla is running for Congresswoman.

Nueva Vizcaya (Note: Incumbent governor Ruth Padilla is running for congresswoman. Her husband, incumbent congressman Carlos Padilla is running in her place.) gubernatorial election
Party	Candidate	Votes	%
Nacionalista	Carlos Padilla	102,150	
UNA	Jose Gambito	72,504	
Independent	Edilberto Calip	3,656	
Independent	Asterio Saquing, Jr.	3,379	
Total votes		181,689	100.00

==== Quirino ====
Incumbent governor Junie Cua is running for reelection unopposed.

Quirino gubernatorial election
Party	Candidate	Votes	%
Liberal	Junie Cua (incumbent)	68,075	100.00
Total votes		68,075	100.00
Liberal hold			

=== Cordillera Administrative Region ===
==== Abra ====
Incumbent governor Eustaquio Bersamin is term limited.

Abra (Note: Incumbent governor Eustaquio Bersamin is term limited and he is running for Mayor of Bangued. His wife, Ruby Bersamin is running in his place.) gubernatorial election
Party	Candidate	Votes	%
NUP	Maria Jocelyn Bernos	66,126	
Liberal	Ruby Bersamin	58,927	
PBM	Antonio Viernes	1,343	
Independent	Robert Bustamante	327	
Total votes		126,723	100.00

==== Apayao ====
Incumbent governor Elias Bulut Jr. is running for reelection unopposed.

Apayao gubernatorial election
Party	Candidate	Votes	%
Liberal	Elias Bulut Jr. (incumbent)	42,358	100.00
Total votes		42,358	100.00
Liberal hold			

==== Benguet ====
Incumbent governor Nestor Fongwan is term limited.

Benguet (Note: Incumbent governor Nestor Fongwan is term limited and is running for congressman.) gubernatorial election
Party	Candidate	Votes	%
Independent	Cresencio Pacalso	65,288	
Liberal	Nelson Dangwa	45,329	
NUP	Melchor Diclas	30,507	
Independent	Oscar Camantiles	13,975	
UNA	Jack Dulnan	7,582	
Total votes		162,681	100.00

==== Ifugao ====
Incumbent Denis Habawel is running for reelection.

Ifugao gubernatorial election
Party	Candidate	Votes	%
Liberal	Pedro Mayam-O	22,379	
Independent	Eugene Balitang	21,465	
NPC	Jonathan Cuyahon	20,835	
Nacionalista	Denis Habawel (incumbent)	12,912	
Independent	Samson Atluna	10,712	
PBM	Jack Dunuan	240	
Independent	Manuel Dangayo	145	
Total votes		88,688	

==== Kalinga ====
Incumbent Jocel Baac is running for reelection.

Kalinga gubernatorial election
Party	Candidate	Votes	%
Liberal	Jocel Baac (incumbent)	47,544	
UNA	Conrado Dieza, Jr.	25,043	
Independent	Gregory Farnaw Claver	24,413	
KBL	Wesley Salibad	272	
Total votes		97,272	100.00

==== Mountain Province ====
Incumbent governor Leonard Mayaen was running unopposed for reelection to a third term, but died in office from a heart attack on March 31, 2016. His daughter, Kathy Jyll, is the substitute candidate.

Mountain Province gubernatorial election
Party	Candidate	Votes	%
Independent	Kathy Jyll Mayaen-Luis	60,664	100.00
Total votes		60,664	100.00
Independent hold			

=== Central Luzon ===
==== Aurora ====
Incumbent governor Gerardo Noveras is running for reelection unopposed.

Aurora gubernatorial election
Party	Candidate	Votes	%
NPC	Gerardo Noveras (incumbent)	76,784	100.00
Total votes		76,784	100.00
NPC hold			

==== Bataan ====
Incumbent governor Albert Garcia is running for reelection unopposed.

Bataan gubernatorial election
Party	Candidate	Votes	%
NUP	Albert Garcia (incumbent)	314,157	100.00
Total votes		314,157	100.00
NUP hold			

==== Bulacan ====
Incumbent governor Wilhelmino Sy-Alvarado is running for re-election.

Bulacan Gubernatorial Election
Party	Candidate	Votes	%
Liberal	Wilhelmino Sy-Alvarado (incumbent)	684,468	56.40
NPC	Josefina Dela Cruz	392,721	32.36
UNA	Roderick Tiongson	53,874	4.43
Independent	Jonjon Mendoza	50,467	4.16
Independent	Fernando Dizon	12,854	1.06
Independent	Clemente De Guzman	5,994	0.49
Independent	Ernesto Balite	3,361	0.28
Independent	Ermalyn Carmen	3,140	0.26
Independent	Apaul Libiran	2,934	0.24
Independent	Andrew Gonzales	2,915	0.24
Independent	Ceo Oloroso	946	0.08
Total votes		1,213,674	100.00
Liberal hold			

==== Nueva Ecija ====
Incumbent governor Aurelio Umali is term limited and is running for congressman for Nueva Ecija's 3rd District.

Nueva Ecija (Note: Incumbent governor Aurelio Umali is term limited and is running for congressman. His wife, incumbent congresswoman Czarina Umali is running in his place.) gubernatorial election
Party	Candidate	Votes	%
Liberal	Czarina Umali	575,167	
NUP	Rodolfo Antonino	354,954	
Total votes		930,121	100.00

==== Pampanga ====
Incumbent governor Lilia Pineda is running for reelection unopposed.

Pampanga gubernatorial election
Party	Candidate	Votes	%
KAMBILAN	Lilia Pineda (incumbent)	737,481	100.00
Total votes		737,481	100.00
KAMBILAN hold			

==== Tarlac ====
Incumbent governor Victor Yap is term limited.

Tarlac (Note: Incumbent governor Victor Yap is term limited and is running for congressman. His sister, incumbent congresswoman Susan Yap is running in his place.) gubernatorial election
Party	Candidate	Votes	%
NPC	Susan Yap	355,493	
PMP	Ace Manalang	199,480	
KBL	Bertito Del Mundo	7,031	
Total votes		562,004	

==== Zambales ====
Incumbent Hermogenes Ebdane is running for reelection.

Zambales gubernatorial election
Party	Candidate	Votes	%
Liberal	Amor Deloso	146,976	
SZP	Hermogenes Ebdane	112,398	
Independent	Constantino Portuguis, Jr.	1,043	
Independent	Ruben Yadao	393	
Total votes		260,810	

=== Calabarzon ===
==== Batangas ====
Incumbent governor Vilma Santos Recto is term limited and is running for Congress. Her party nominated incumbent Vice Governor Mark Leviste.

Batangas (Note: Incumbent governor Vilma Santos Recto is term limited and is running for congresswoman.) gubernatorial election
Party	Candidate	Votes	%
UNA	Hermilando Mandanas	337,829	26.79
NPC	Mark Llandro Mendoza	293,852	23.31
Liberal	Jose Antonio Leviste II	292,665	23.21
PDP–Laban	Nicanor Briones	204,756	16.24
Independent	Marcos Mandanas, Sr.	19,797	1.57
Margin of victory		43,977	3.48
Valid ballots		1,148,899	91.14
Invalid or blank votes		111,705	8.86
Total votes		1,260,604	100.00
Turnout		1,526,195	82.60
UNA gain from Liberal			

==== Cavite ====
Current provincial governor Jonvic Remulla will not run for reelection.

Cavite (Note: Incumbent governor Jonvic Remulla filed his candidacy but later withdrew. His brother, former 7th District Representative Jesus Crispin Remulla is running in his place.) gubernatorial election
Party	Candidate	Votes	%
UNA	Jesus Crispin Remulla	1,069,485	
PDP–Laban	Obet Borral	26,286	
Independent	Richard Balanzag	22,234	
Liberal	Gerbie Ber Ado	17,854	
Total votes		1,135,859	100.00
UNA hold			

==== Laguna ====
The current governor, Ramil Hernandez, the former vice-governor, will run for his first full term against ex-governor ER Ejercito, who was unseated in 2014 by a COMELEC decision.

Laguna gubernatorial election
Party	Candidate	Votes	%
Nacionalista	Ramil Hernandez (incumbent)	607,347	51.12
PGP	Jorge Antonio "Jerico" Ejercito	337,627	28.42
UNA	Emilio Ramon "E.R." Ejercito	233,901	19.69
PBM	Berlene Alberto	6,081	0.51
Independent	Nemesio Sucano	3,111	0.26
Total votes		1,188,067	100.00
Nacionalista hold			

==== Quezon ====
Quezon gubernatorial election
Party	Candidate	Votes	%
NUP	David Suarez (incumbent)	753,864	
Liberal	Teodorico Gonzales	7,566	
Bangon Pilipinas	Fiden Salumbides	6,947	
PGP	Danny Pasatiempo	4,115	
PDP–Laban	Reynulfo Raquepo	3,985	
Total votes		776,477	100.00

==== Rizal ====
Rizal gubernatorial election
Party	Candidate	Votes	%
NPC	Rebecca Ynares (incumbent)	768,574	
PDP–Laban	Esteban Salonga	84,112	
Liberal	Jose Velasco	21,141	
UNA	Silverio Bulanon	6,023	
Total votes		879,850	100.00

=== Mimaropa ===
==== Marinduque ====
Marinduque gubernatorial election
Party	Candidate	Votes	%
Liberal	Carmencita Reyes (incumbent)	57,807	
PGP	Victoria L. Lim	34,850	
UNA	Melecio Go	12,931	
Total votes		105,588	100.00

==== Occidental Mindoro ====
Occidental Mindoro gubernatorial election
Party	Candidate	Votes	%
Liberal	Mario Gene Mendiola (incumbent)	109,688	
Lakas	Ma. Amelita Villarosa	59,243	
PGP	Jenny Tibay	1,947	
Total votes		170,878	100.00

==== Oriental Mindoro ====
Oriental Mindoro gubernatorial election
Party	Candidate	Votes	%
Liberal	Alfonso Umali (incumbent)	217,103	
UNA	Sally Andaya	74,858	
PGP	Jojo Batoy	6,127	
Total votes		298,088	100.00

==== Palawan ====
Palawan gubernatorial election
Party	Candidate	Votes	%
Liberal	Jose Alvarez (incumbent)	194,262	
PRP	Art Ventura	96,343	
PGP	Richard Lopez	10,085	
PDP–Laban	Arnel Relox	6,573	
UNA	Rudy Babera	5,624	
Total votes		312,887	100.00

==== Romblon ====
Romblon gubernatorial election
Party	Candidate	Votes	%
Liberal	Eduardo Firmalo (incumbent)	75,493	
PMP	Gerard Montojo	36,456	
UNA	Telesforo Gaan	1,088	
Total votes		121,247	100.00

=== Bicol Region ===
==== Albay ====
Incumbent governor Joey Salceda is term limited.

Albay (Note: Incumbent governor Joey Salceda is term limited and is running for congressman.) gubernatorial election
Party	Candidate	Votes	%
Nacionalista	Al Francis Bichara	425,368	
Independent	Jim Hernandez	16,745	
Independent	Paul Aguilar	12,616	
Independent	Mar Baquil	9,642	
Total votes		464,371	100.00

==== Camarines Norte ====
Camarines Norte gubernatorial election
Party	Candidate	Votes	%
NPC	Edgar Tallado	111,318	
Liberal	Cathy Barcelona-Reyes	106,103	
Nacionalista	Jesus Typoco, Jr.	13,766	
PBM	Clint Saniel	3,589	
Independent	Antonio Lukban	788	
Total votes		235,564	100.00

==== Camarines Sur ====
Camarines Sur gubernatorial election
Party	Candidate	Votes	%
Nacionalista	Migz Villafuerte (incumbent)	410,046	
UNA	Arnulf Bryan Fuentebella	269,617	
KBL	Roger Buenaflor	6,560	
Total votes		683,368	100.00

==== Catanduanes ====
Catanduanes (Note: Incumbent governor Araceli Wong filed her candidacy but later withdrew. Her son, Jardin Bryan Wong is running in her place.) gubernatorial election
Party	Candidate	Votes	%
UNA	Joseph Cua	57,691	
Liberal	Jardin Bryan Wong	43,721	
NPC	Jose Teves, Jr.	37,821	
Total votes		139,233	100.00

==== Masbate ====
Masbate (Note: Incumbent vice governor Vince Revil assumed as acting governor when governor Rizalina Seachon-Lanete was arrested for alleged involvement in the Pork Barrel Scam and is running for congressman.) gubernatorial election
Party	Candidate	Votes	%
Nacionalista	Antonio Kho	117,047	
NPC	Rizalina Seachon-Lanete	106,300	
NUP	Narciso Bravo Jr.	101,894	
KBL	Mercy Cabiles	8,841	
Total votes		334,082	

==== Sorsogon ====
Sorsogon (Note: Incumbent governor Raul Lee is not running.) gubernatorial election
Party	Candidate	Votes	%
Liberal	Robert Rodrigueza	135,191	
Independent	Roland Añonuevo	82,239	
PDP–Laban	Mark Eric Dioneda	57,722	
Independent	Olivia Bermillo	14,975	
Independent	Roberto Reyes	4,044	
Independent	Jose Gabales	2,549	
Independent	Amadeo Brin	2,486	
PBM	Lady Gabarda	1,744	
Total votes		300,950	100.00

== Visayas ==
=== Western Visayas ===
==== Aklan ====
Aklan gubernatorial election
Party	Candidate	Votes	%
Liberal	Florencio Miraflores (incumbent)	138,842	54.41
UNA	Antonio Maming	116,682	45.59
Total votes		255,164	100.00

==== Antique ====
Exequiel Javier is the incumbent governor. However, in January 2015, the Commission on Elections en banc disqualifies Javier (voting 4-2) for violating the Omnibus Election Code after suspending Valderrama, Antique Mayor Joyce Roquero. The then Vice Governor, Rhodora Cadiao assumed the vacated Office of Antique Provincial Governor on February 3, 2015 after the Department of Interior and Local Government imposed the disqualification. However, on January 12, 2016; The Supreme Court overruled and reversed the decision of the Commission on Elections en banc, reinstating Javier into office on March 28, 2016.

Antique gubernatorial election
Party	Candidate	Votes	%
NUP	Rhodora Cadiao	134,806	
Liberal	Exequiel Javier (incumbent)	102,706	
Total votes		237,512	100.00

==== Capiz ====
Incumbent governor Victor Tanco, Sr. is term limited

Capiz (Note: Incumbent governor Victor Tanco, Sr. is term limited.) gubernatorial election
Party	Candidate	Votes	%
Liberal	Antonio del Rosario	242,692	
Independent	Doming Belonio	14,990	
Independent	Bros Diapo	2,727	
Total votes		260,409	100.00

==== Guimaras ====
Guimaras gubernatorial election
Party	Candidate	Votes	%
Liberal	Samuel Gumarin (incumbent)	46,348	
UNA	Felipe Hilan Nava	36,132	
Total votes		82,480	100.00

==== Iloilo ====
Iloilo gubernatorial election
Party	Candidate	Votes	%
Liberal	Arthur Defensor, Sr. (incumbent)	705,151	
Independent	Gil Lebin	14,725	
Independent	Diopito Gonzales	14,364	
Total votes		734,240	100.00

=== Negros Island Region ===
==== Negros Occidental ====
Incumbent governor Alfredo Marañon is running for reelection unopposed.

Negros Occidental gubernatorial election
Party	Candidate	Votes	%
UNegA	Alfredo Marañon (incumbent)	685,516	100.00
Total votes		685,516	100.00

==== Negros Oriental ====
Negros Oriental gubernatorial election
Party	Candidate	Votes	%
NUP	Roel Degamo (incumbent)	336,567	
NPC	George Arnaiz	225,782	
Independent	Magdegamo Gasendo	6,739	
Total votes		535,638	100.00

=== Central Visayas ===
==== Bohol ====
Bohol gubernatorial election
Party	Candidate	Votes	%
Liberal	Edgar Chatto	336,567	
PDP–Laban	Rosemarie Lim-Imboy	225,782	
LM	Wenceslao Garcia	9,986	
Independent	Kary Balagosa	2,550	
KBL	Cipriano Gaudicos	1,317	
Total votes		576,202	100.00

==== Cebu ====
Cebu gubernatorial election
Party	Candidate	Votes	%
Liberal	Hilario Davide III	616,381	47.79
1CEBU	Winston Garcia	593,725	46.04
Independent	Boyet Cortes	32,410	3.62
Independent	Desiderio Estinozo	13,352	1.04
KBL	Leandro Boy Patalinghug	10,977	0.85
Independent	Nonito Magnanao	8,518	0.66
Total votes		1,289,656	100.00

==== Siquijor ====
Siquijor gubernatorial election
Party	Candidate	Votes	%
Liberal	Zaldy Villa	31,708	60.02
UNA	Orlando Fua	15,481	29.31
NUP	Claire Bulahan-Lucero	3,888	7.36
Independent	Armin Demetillo	1,471	2.78
Independent	Regidor Miraflor	279	0.53
Total votes		52,827	100.00

=== Eastern Visayas ===
==== Biliran ====
Incumbent governor Gerardo Espina, Jr. is running for reelection unopposed.

Biliran gubernatorial election
Party	Candidate	Votes	%
Liberal	Gerardo Espina, Jr. (incumbent)	52,518	100.00
Valid ballots		52,518	59.32
Invalid or blank votes		36,014	40.68
Total votes		88,532	100.00
Liberal hold			

==== Eastern Samar ====
Eastern Samar gubernatorial election
Party	Candidate	Votes	%
Liberal	Conrado Nicart, Jr. (incumbent)	135,211	62.72
NUP	Marcelino Libanan, Jr.	80,351	37.28
Valid ballots		215,562	84.06
Margin of victory		54,860	25.44
Invalid or blank votes		40,874	15.94
Total votes		256,436	100.00
Liberal hold			

==== Leyte ====
Leyte gubernatorial election
Party	Candidate	Votes	%
Liberal	Leopoldo Dominico Petillla (incumbent)	454,308	94.49
Independent	Baldomero Falcone	13,341	2.77
Independent	Philip Nielo	13,151	2.74
Valid ballots		480,800	61.60
Margin of victory		440,967	91.72
Invalid or blank votes		299,673	38.40
Total votes		780,473	100.00
Liberal hold			

==== Northern Samar ====
Northern Samar gubernatorial election
Party	Candidate	Votes	%
NUP	Jose Ong, Jr. (incumbent)	179,586	70.16
Independent	Walter Cerbito	70,480	27.54
Independent	Tangni De Asis	4,137	1.62
Independent	Rolando Nitor	1,748	0.68
Valid ballots		255,951	79.23
Margin of victory		109,106	42.62
Invalid or blank votes		67,116	20.77
Total votes		323,067	100.00
NUP hold			

==== Samar ====
Samar gubernatorial election
Party	Candidate	Votes	%
NPC	Sharee Ann Tan (incumbent)	195,366	57.15
Liberal	Emil Zosa	133,743	39.12
Independent	Milagrosa Tan	8,598	2.51
Independent	Victoria Zosa	2,351	0.74
Independent	Renato Capalis	1,099	0.32
Independent	Ramon Porcare	718	0.21
Valid ballots		341,875	80.97
Margin of victory		61,623	18.03
Invalid or blank votes		80,361	19.03
Total votes		422,236	100.00
NPC hold			

==== Southern Leyte ====
Southern Leyte (Note: Incumbent governor Roger Mercado is running for congressman. His brother, incumbent congressman Damian Mercado is running in his place.) gubernatorial election
Party	Candidate	Votes	%
Liberal	Damian Mercado	120,340	60.29
UNA	Sheffered Lino Tan	79,275	39.71
Valid ballots		199,615	88.74
Margin of victory		41,065	20.58
Invalid or blank votes		25,321	11.26
Total votes		224,936	100.00
Liberal gain from NUP			

== Mindanao ==
=== Zamboanga Peninsula ===
==== Zamboanga del Norte ====
Zamboanga del Norte gubernatorial election
Party	Candidate	Votes	%
Liberal	Roberto Uy (incumbent)	241,690	
NPC	Rolando Yebes	163,026	
Independent	Nestor Dapar	2,319	
Independent	Eufracio Bala	1,515	
Independent	Dong Dagurayan	1,256	
Total votes		409,806	100.00

==== Zamboanga del Sur ====
Zamboanga del Sur gubernatorial election
Party	Candidate	Votes	%
NPC	Antonio Cerilles (incumbent)	310,652	
Aksyon	Tirsendo Poloyapoy	42,339	
Independent	Geehan Lee Cometa	4,385	
Total votes		357,376	100.00

==== Zamboanga Sibugay ====
Zamboanga Sibugay gubernatorial election
Party	Candidate	Votes	%
Liberal	Wilter Palma (incumbent)	139,540	
Nacionalista	Romeo Jalosjos, Jr.	95,990	
Independent	Joel Brito	915	
Independent	Gerryboy Benedicto	905	
NUP	Jaime Natividad	624	
Total votes		237,924	100.00

=== Northern Mindanao ===
==== Bukidnon ====
Bukidnon gubernatorial election
Party	Candidate	Votes	%
BPP	Jose Maria Zubiri, Jr.	398,187	
Independent	Diosdado Tabios	93,994	
Independent	Delia Arroyo	5,069	
Independent	Delfina Bicatulo	3,520	
Total votes		500,770	100.00

==== Camiguin ====
Incumbent governor Jurdin Jesus Romualdo is term limited and is running for Mayor of Mambajao.

Camiguin (Note: Incumbent governor Jurdin Jesus Romualdo is term limited and is running for Mayor of Mambajao. His wife, incumbent Mambajao Mayor Ma. Luisa Romualdo is running in his place.) gubernatorial election
Party	Candidate	Votes	%
Liberal	Ma. Luisa Romualdo	41,965	100.00
Total votes		41,965	100.00
Liberal hold			

==== Lanao del Norte ====
Incumbent governor Mohamad Khalid Dimaporo is term limited.

Lanao del Norte (Note: Incumbent governor Mohamad Khalid Dimaporo is term limited and is running for Congressman of Lanao del Norte's 1st District. His mother, incumbent congresswoman Imelda Quibranza Dimaporo is running in his place.) gubernatorial election
Party	Candidate	Votes	%
Liberal	Imelda Quibranza Dimaporo	146,964	
UNA	Eleanor Lantud	68,902	
PDP–Laban	Roberto Quicio, Jr.	2,942	
PBM	Aleem Abdulasis Ampaso	2,597	
Independent	Omar Azis	1,304	
Independent	Antonio Simangan, Jr.	490	
Total votes		223,199	100.00

==== Misamis Occidental ====
Misamis Occidental gubernatorial election
Party	Candidate	Votes	%
NUP	Herminia Ramiro	214,408	97.41
Independent	Alex Dologuin	5,690	2.59
Total votes		220,098	100.00

==== Misamis Oriental ====
Misamis Oriental gubernatorial election
Party	Candidate	Votes	%
UNA	Yevgeny Vicente Emano	243,972	58.12
NUP	Julio Uy	175,835	41.88
Margin of victory		68,137	16.24
Total votes		419,807	100.00

=== Davao Region ===
==== Compostela Valley ====
Incumbent governor Arturo Uy is term limited.

Compostela Valley (Note: Incumbent governor Arturo Uy is term limited and he is running for board member. His son, Jayvee Tyron is running in his place.) gubernatorial election
Party	Candidate	Votes	%
Liberal	Jayvee Tyron Uy	167,267	51.92
Aksyon	Rommel Amatong	158,394	48.64
Independent	Josue Cañaveral	1,407	0.44
Margin of victory		8,873	3.28
Total votes		327,068	100.00

==== Davao del Norte ====
Incumbent governor Rodolfo del Rosario, Sr. is term limited.

Davao del Norte (Note: Incumbent governor Rodolfo Del Rosario, Jr. is term limited and retiring for politics. His son, Anthony is running in his place.) gubernatorial election
Party	Candidate	Votes	%
Liberal	Anthony del Rosario	276,651	72.04
Independent	Victorio Suaybaguio, Jr.	107,352	27.96
Total votes		384,003	100.00

==== Davao del Sur ====
Davao del Sur gubernatorial election
Party	Candidate	Votes	%
Nacionalista	Douglas Cagas	136,157	
NPC	Arsenio Latasa	116,975	
Independent	Bernard Gortina	10,561	
Independent	Ronald Banac	1,276	
Independent	Emilio Lustre	894	
Total votes		265,863	100.00

==== Davao Occidental ====
The first governor of Davao Occidental will be determined. Since Claude Bautista was the sole candidate, he will stand unopposed for election.

Davao Occidental gubernatorial election
Party	Candidate	Votes	%
NPC	Claude Bautista	79,073	100.00
Valid ballots		79,073	66.18
Invalid or blank votes		40,410	33.82
Total votes		119,483	100.00
NPC hold			

==== Davao Oriental ====
Incumbent governor Corazon Malanyaon is term limited.

Davao Oriental (Note: Incumbent governor Corazon Malanyaon is term limited and is running for congresswoman.) gubernatorial election
Party	Candidate	Votes	%
Liberal	Nelson Dayanghirang	139,445	57.49
NPC	Thelma Almario	103,093	42.51
Total votes		242,538	100.00

=== Soccksargen ===
==== Cotabato ====
Cotabato gubernatorial election
Party	Candidate	Votes	%
Liberal	Emmylou Taliño-Mendoza	322,064	
Independent	Lito Monreal	56,737	
Independent	Manuel Adajar	23,352	
KBL	Datu Alex Tudon	14,219	
Independent	Norodin Mangulamas	10,093	
Total votes		426,465	100.00

==== Sarangani ====
Sarangani gubernatorial election
Party	Candidate	Votes	%
PCM	Steve Solon	139,446	
Liberal	Mohamad Aquia	27,554	
NPC	Juan Domino	15,082	
Total votes		182,082	100.00

==== South Cotabato ====
South Cotabato gubernatorial election
Party	Candidate	Votes	%
NPC	Daisy Avance-Fuentes	205,482	
Independent	Fernando Miguel	159,274	
Independent	Lino Saig	1,131	
Total votes		365,887	100.00

==== Sultan Kudarat ====
Incumbent governor Suharto Mangudadatu is term limited.

Sultan Kudarat (Note: Incumbent governor Suharto Mangudadatu is term limited and is running for congressman. His father Pax Mangudadatu is running in his place.) gubernatorial election
Party	Candidate	Votes	%
PTM	Pax Mangudadatu	173,665	
Liberal	Diosdado Pallasigue	95,514	
KBL	Bagwis Europa	1,137	
Total votes		270,316	100.00

=== Caraga ===
==== Agusan del Norte ====
Agusan del Norte gubernatorial election
Party	Candidate	Votes	%
Liberal	Angel Amante-Matba	92,825	53.95
Nacionalista	Sadeka Garcia-Tomaneng	79,217	46.05
Total votes		172,042	100.09

==== Agusan del Sur ====
Incumbent governor Edddiebong Plaza is running for reelection unopposed.

Agusan del Sur gubernatorial election
Party	Candidate	Votes	%
NUP	Eddiebong Plaza (incumbent)	224,303	100.00
Total votes		224,303	100.00
NUP hold			

==== Dinagat Islands ====
Dinagat Islands gubernatorial election
Party	Candidate	Votes	%
UNA	Glenda Ecleo (incumbent)	34,263	100.00
Total votes		34,263	100.00
UNA hold			

==== Surigao del Norte ====
Surigao del Norte gubernatorial election
Party	Candidate	Votes	%
Liberal	Sol Matugas	142,717	56.56
Nacionalista	Guillermo Romarate, Jr.	109,630	43.44
Total votes		252,347	100.00

==== Surigao del Sur ====
Incumbent governor Johnny Pimentel is running for congressman.

Surigao del Sur (Note: Incumbent governor Johnny Pimentel is running for congressman. His brother, Vicente is running in his place.) gubernatorial election
Party	Candidate	Votes	%
Liberal	Vicente Pimentel Jr.	161,642	59.78
NPC	Florencio Enciong Garay	106,768	39.48
Independent	Joseph Arniego	1,997	0.74
Total votes		270,407	100.00

=== Autonomous Region in Muslim Mindanao ===
==== Basilan ====
Incumbent governor Jum Jainudin Akbar is term limited.

Basilan (Note: Incumbent governor Jum Jainudin Akbar is term limited and is running for congressman.) gubernatorial election
Party	Candidate	Votes	%
Liberal	Hadjiman Hataman Salliman	114,070	
UNA	Joel Maturan	50,984	
Independent	Abdulhan Jaujohn	1,188	
Independent	Ondos Sahdin	832	
PBM	Datu Jhularab Sampang	781	
Total votes		167,855	100.00

==== Lanao del Sur ====
Incumbent governor Mamintal Alonto Adiong Jr. is term limited.

Lanao del Sur (Note: Incumbent governor Mamintal Alonto Adiong Jr. is term limited and is running for Vice Governor. His wife Soraya is running in his place.) gubernatorial election
Party	Candidate	Votes	%
Liberal	Soraya Adiong	194,853	
UNA	Fahad Salic	128,298	
Independent	Pangalian Balindong	26,325	
Independent	Jahl Lucman	5,126	
Independent	Ahmadjan Abdulcarim	1,458	
PBM	Abdul Fatah Sarip	1,067	
Total votes		357,127	100.00

==== Maguindanao ====
Maguindanao gubernatorial election
Party	Candidate	Votes	%
Liberal	Esmael Mangudadatu	241,267	
UNA	Datu Ali Midtimbang, Sr.	147,259	
KBL	Ameril Malaguiok	1,500	
Independent	Amer Hadjinor	697	
PBM	Kalil Abeb	602	
Total votes		391,325	100.00

==== Sulu ====
Sulu gubernatorial election
Party	Candidate	Votes	%
Liberal	Abdusakur Tan II	179,626	
LDP	Cocoy Tulawie	46,127	
Independent	Abdulwahid Sahidulla	28,479	
PBM	Abdulwahab Karimuddin	665	
Total votes		254,897	100.00

==== Tawi-Tawi ====
Tawi-Tawi gubernatorial election
Party	Candidate	Votes	%
NUP	Rashidin Matba	79,043	55.94
Liberal	Nurbert Sahali	62,245	44.06
Total votes		141,288	100.00
