= 2016 Philippine House of Representatives elections =

24th Philippine House of Representatives elections

- May 9, 2016
- All 297 seats to the House of Representatives of the Philippines; 149 seats needed for a majority
- Congressional district elections
- All 238 seats from congressional districts
Party	Vote %	Seats	+/–
Liberal	41.72	115	+6
NPC	17.04	42	0
NUP	9.67	23	−1
Nacionalista	9.42	24	+6
UNA	6.62	11	+3
PDP–Laban	1.90	3	+3
Lakas	1.54	4	−10
Aksyon	1.38	1	+1
LDP	0.30	2	0
Others	7.29	12	+7
This lists parties that won seats. See the complete results below.
- Party-list election
- All 59 seats under the party-list system
Party	Vote %	Seats	+/–
Ako Bicol	5.14	3	+1
Gabriela	4.22	2	0
1-Pacman	4.05	2	+2
ACT Teachers	3.65	2	+1
Senior Citizens	3.05	2	0
KABAYAN	2.60	2	+2
Agri-Agra	2.58	2	+1
PBA	2.41	2	+2
Buhay	2.35	2	−1
Abono	2.26	2	0
Anak Mindanao	2.18	2	+1
Coop-NATCCO	2.07	2	0
Others	41.45	34	+4
This lists parties that won seats. See the complete results below.
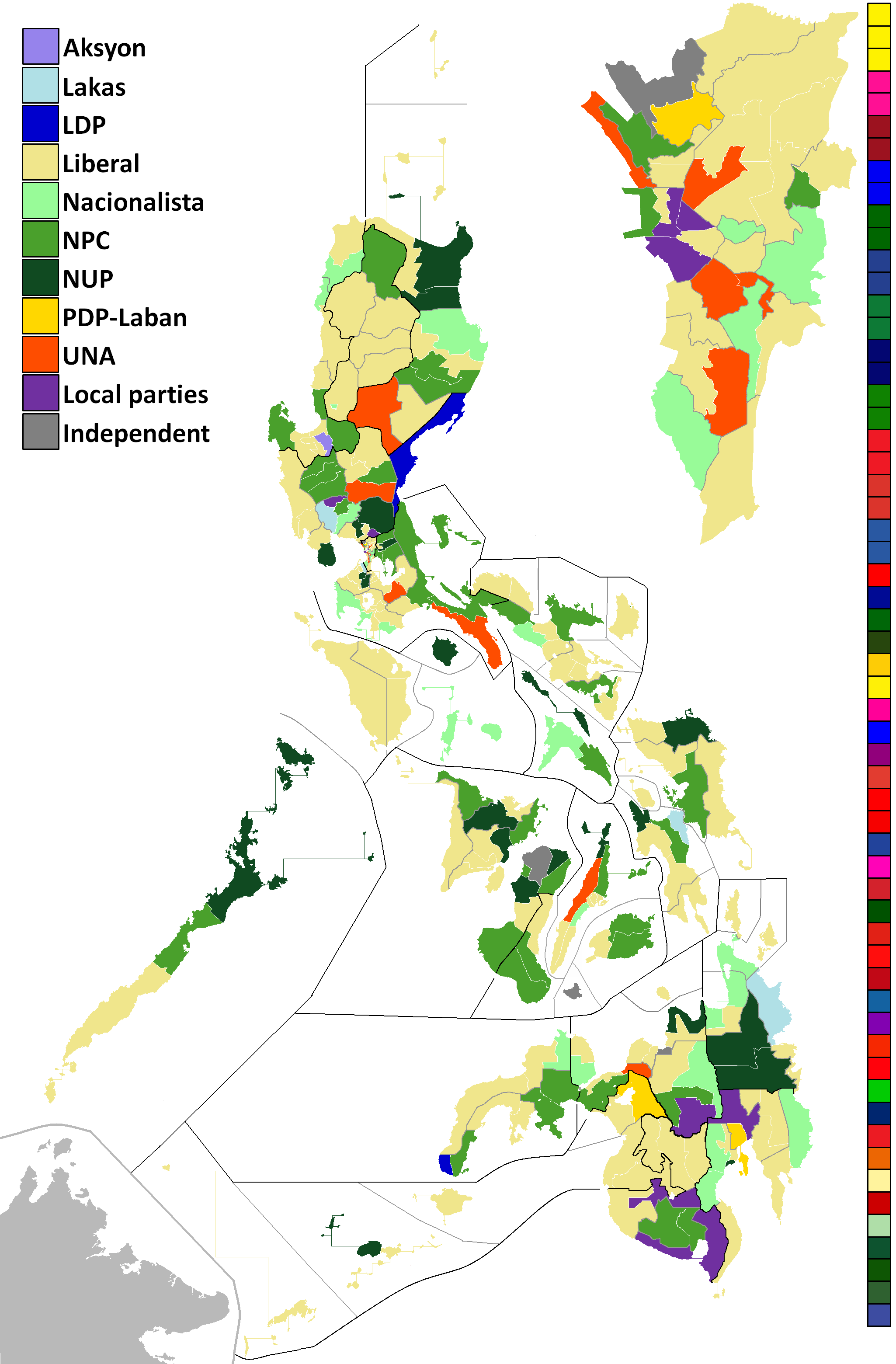
Election results; map refers to results from congressional districts, with Metro Manila at the inset, while the boxes to the right represent party-list seats.
Speaker before	Speaker after
Feliciano Belmonte Jr. Liberal	Pantaleon Alvarez; PDP–Laban

The 2016 Philippine House of Representatives elections were the 34th lower house elections in the Philippines, and 24th as House of Representatives. They were held on May 9, 2016, to elect members to the House of Representatives of the Philippines. The winning candidates were to comprise the House's contingent in the 17th Congress of the Philippines that would serve from June 30, 2016, to June 30, 2019.

The House of Representatives elections were part of the 2016 general election where elections for President, Vice President, Senators, and all local officials, including those from the Autonomous Region in Muslim Mindanao, were also held.

The Philippines uses parallel voting in its lower house elections. There are 297 seats in the House; 238 of these are district representatives, and 59 are party-list representatives. The law mandates that there should be one party-list representative for every four district representatives. District representatives are elected under the plurality voting system from single-member districts. Party-list representatives are elected via the nationwide vote with a 2% "soft" election threshold, with a 3-seat cap. The party in the party-list election with the most votes usually wins three seats, the other parties with more than 2% of the vote two seats, and the parties with less than 2% of the vote winning a seat each if the 20% quota is not met.

== Electoral system ==
The election for seats in the House of Representatives is done via parallel voting. A voter has two votes: one for one's local district, and another via the party-list system. A candidate is not allowed to stand for both ballots, and parties participating in the district elections would have to ask for permission on the Commission on Elections, with major parties not allowed to participate, in the party-list election.

=== Election via the districts ===
Each congressional district sends one representative to the House of Representatives, with the winner having the highest number of votes winning that district's seat (i.e., single-member district). The representatives from the districts comprise at most 80% of the seats.

=== Election via the party-list system ===
In the party-list system, the parties contesting the election represent a sector, or several sectors, or an ethnic group. In determining the winners, the entire country is treated as one "district". Each party that surpasses the 2% election threshold automatically wins one seat, they can win an additional number of seats in proportion to the number of votes they received, but they can't have more than three seats. The representatives elected via the party-list system, also known as "sectoral representatives" should comprise at least 20% of the seats. However, since the winners from the parties that surpass the 2% threshold had not reached the 20% quota ever since the party-list system was instituted, the parties that received less than 2% of the first preference vote are given one seat each until the 20% quota has been filled up.

=== Campaigning ===
The parties contesting the district elections campaign at the district level; there is no national-level campaigning. While no party has been able to win a majority of seats in the House of Representatives since the 1987 elections, the party of the incumbent president had usually controlled the chamber in the phenomenon known locally as the "Padrino System" or patronage politics, with other parties aligning themselves with the president's policies in exchange for pork barrel and future political favors.

Usually, a gubernatorial candidate has a slate of candidates for vice governor, board members and representative. Gubernatorial candidates, aside from supporting a slate of national politicians, may also have slates in the individual cities or towns for mayors, vice mayors and councilors. These slates are usually under one party, but multi-party alliances are not uncommon.

== Redistricting ==
Reapportioning (redistricting) the number of seats is either via national reapportionment three years after the release of every census, or via piecemeal redistricting for every province or city. National reapportionment has not happened since the 1987 constitution took effect, and aside from piecemeal redistricting, the apportionment was based on the ordinance from the constitution, which was in turn based from the 1980 census.

=== Changes from the outgoing Congress ===
These are the 5 new districts that was contested for the first time in 2016:

- Creation of Davao Occidental province
  - Davao del Sur's 2nd district's southernmost municipalities becomes the new province of Davao Occidental with its own at-large district.
  - Three northernmost municipalities being retained with Davao del Sur, and that province reverting to as an at-large district.
  - Enacted into law as Republic Act No. 10360.
  - Approved in a plebiscite held on October 28, 2013.
- Division of Laguna's 1st district to two districts
  - Biñan becomes its own at-large district.
  - The rest of the 1st district is kept intact.
  - Enacted into law as Republic Act No. 10658.
- Reapportionment of Batangas from four districts to six
  - Batangas City becomes the 5th district.
  - Lipa becomes the 6th district
  - The original four districts were left otherwise intact.
  - Enacted into law as Republic Act No. 10673.
- Division of Cebu's 2nd district to two districts
  - Cebu's 2nd district's municipalities facing the Tañon Strait, except Samboan and Santander, becomes the 7th district,
  - The rest of the 2nd district were left intact.
  - Enacted into law as Republic Act No. 10684.

The creation of Davao Occidental didn't create new districts, as it only split off from Davao del Sur's 2nd district. The other redistricting laws created four districts, of which 2 came from Batangas, and one each from Laguna and Cebu.

=== Summary of changes ===
As there were 238 districts, and there should be one party-list seat for every 4 districts, this means there are 59 party-list seats, and 297 total seats.

Category	Total
Congressional districts in the outgoing Congress	234
New districts from redistricting laws from previous Congress	0
New districts from redistricting laws from outgoing Congress	4
Congressional districts in the next Congress	238
Party-list seats for the next Congress	59
Total seats for the next Congress	297

== Retiring and term limited incumbents ==
There are 69 open seats in the House from incumbents that are term-limited and were not running.

== Results ==
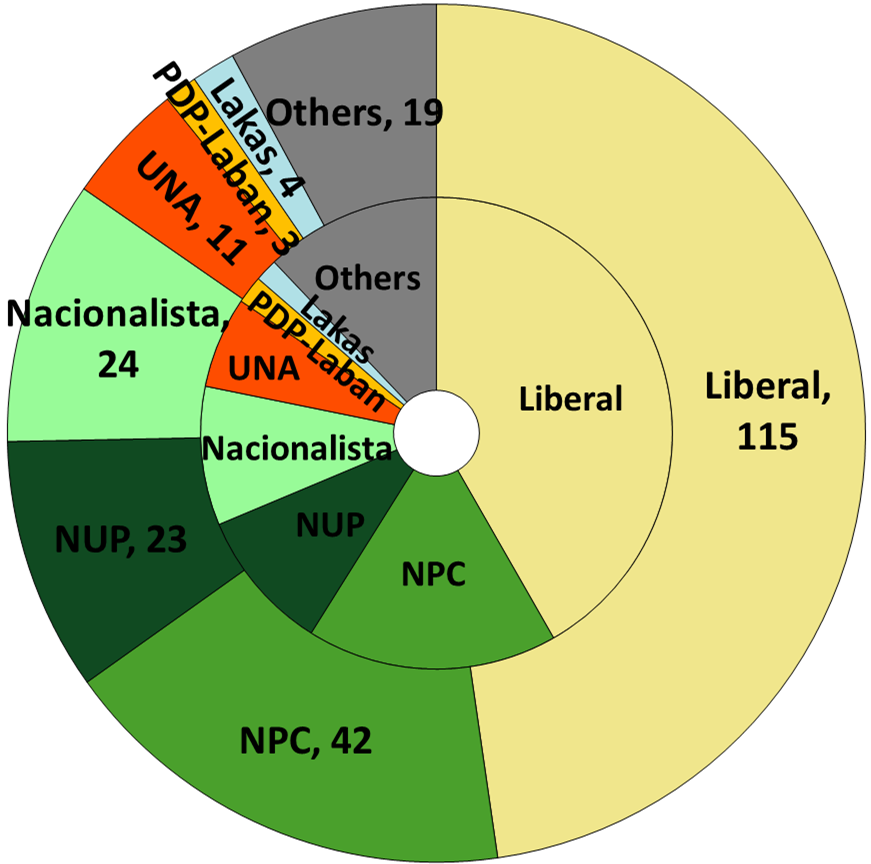
2016 Philippine House congressional district elections chart of votes (inner ring) compared to seats won (outer ring).

President Benigno Aquino III's Liberal Party emerged with the party having the plurality of seats in the House of Representatives, winning more than a hundred seats. Meanwhile, in the presidential election, Davao City mayor Rodrigo Duterte of Partido Demokratiko Pilipino-Lakas ng Bayan (PDP–Laban) emerged with an insurmountable lead over the Liberals' Mar Roxas.

Meanwhile, the Nationalist People's Coalition finished second in number of seats won, followed by the Nacionalista Party, National Unity Party, United Nationalist Alliance, Lakas–CMD, PDP–Laban, Laban ng Demokratikong Pilipino and Aksyon Demokratiko. Several local parties also won seats, along with a handful of independents.

While PDP–Laban just won three seats, several members of the Liberal Party immediately abandoned that party in favor of PDP–Laban. PDP–Laban also signed coalition agreements with all major parties, including the Liberal Party, ensuring that they would have the numbers once the 17th Congress of the Philippines opens in late July.

=== Congressional districts results ===
Party	Votes	%	+/–	Seats	+/–
Liberal Party	15,552,401	41.72	+4.16	115	+6
Nationalist People's Coalition	6,350,310	17.04	−0.04	42	0
National Unity Party	3,604,266	9.67	+1.12	23	−1
Nacionalista Party	3,512,975	9.42	+1.01	24	+6
United Nationalist Alliance	2,468,335	6.62	−4.55	11	+3
PDP–Laban	706,407	1.90	+0.90	3	New
Lakas–CMD	573,843	1.54	−3.70	4	−10
Aksyon Demokratiko	514,612	1.38	+1.03	1	New
Kilusang Bagong Lipunan	198,754	0.53	+0.19	0	−1
Asenso Manileño	184,602	0.50	New	2	New
Kusog Baryohanon	172,601	0.46	New	1	New
Partido Tinig ng Masa	145,417	0.39	New	1	New
People's Champ Movement	142,307	0.38	New	1	New
Bukidnon Paglaum	129,678	0.35	−0.01	1	0
Lingap Lugud	127,762	0.34	New	1	New
Padayon Pilipino	127,759	0.34	New	0	0
One Cebu	114,732	0.31	+0.23	0	0
Laban ng Demokratikong Pilipino	111,086	0.30	−0.02	2	0
Arangkada San Joseño	83,945	0.23	New	1	New
Pwersa ng Masang Pilipino	78,020	0.21	−0.30	0	0
Kabalikat ng Bayan sa Kaunlaran	72,130	0.19	−0.15	1	0
Hugpong sa Tawong Lungsod	53,186	0.14	−0.09	0	0
Sulong Zambales	52,415	0.14	−0.07	0	0
Centrist Democratic Party of the Philippines	13,662	0.04	−0.20	0	−1
Partido ng Manggagawa at Magsasaka	7,239	0.02	−0.02	0	0
Philippine Green Republican Party	4,426	0.01	New	0	0
Independent	2,172,562	5.83	−0.09	4	−2
Party-list seats				59	0
Total	37,275,432	100.00	–	297	+4
Valid votes	37,275,432	83.97	+13.95		
Invalid/blank votes	7,116,943	16.03	−13.95		
Total votes	44,392,375	100.00	–		
Registered voters/turnout	54,363,844	81.66	+4.48		
Source: COMELEC (Seats won), (Turnout and electorate)

Vote share
Liberal	41.72%
NPC	17.04%
NUP	9.67%
Nacionalista	9.42%
UNA	6.62%
PDP-Laban	1.90%
Others	13.63%

Congressional district seats
Liberal	48.32%
NPC	17.65%
NUP	9.66%
Nacionalista	10.08%
UNA	4.62%
PDP-Laban	1.26%
Others	8.41%

==== By district ====
Congressional district	Incumbent	Incumbent's party	Winner	Winner's party
Abra	Joy Bernos	NUP	Joseph Bernos	Liberal
Agusan del Norte–1st	Lawrence Fortun	Liberal	Lawrence Fortun	Liberal
Agusan del Norte–2nd	Erlpe John Amante	Nacionalista	Erlpe John Amante	Nacionalista
Agusan del Sur–1st	Maria Valentina Plaza	NUP	Maria Valentina Plaza	NUP
Agusan del Sur–2nd	Evelyn Plaza-Mellana	NUP	Evelyn Plaza-Mellana	NUP
Aklan	Teodorico Haresco Jr.	Nacionalista	Carlito Marquez	NPC
Albay–1st	Edcel Greco Lagman	Liberal	Edcel Lagman	Liberal
Albay–2nd	Al Francis Bichara	Nacionalista	Joey Salceda	Liberal
Albay–3rd	Fernando Gonzalez	Liberal	Fernando Gonzalez	Liberal
Antipolo–1st	Roberto Puno	NUP	Chiqui Roa-Puno	NUP
Antipolo–2nd	Romeo Acop	Liberal	Romeo Acop	Liberal
Antique	Paolo Everardo Javier	Liberal	Paolo Everardo Javier	Liberal
Apayao	Eleanor Begtang	NPC	Eleanor Begtang	NPC
Aurora	Bella Angara	LDP	Bella Angara	LDP
Bacolod	Evelio Leonardia	NPC	Greg Gasataya	NPC
Baguio	Nicasio Aliping Jr.	Liberal	Mark Go	Nacionalista
Basilan	Hadjiman Hataman Salliman	Liberal	Jum Jainudin Akbar	Liberal
Bataan–1st	Herminia Roman	Liberal	Geraldine Roman	Liberal
Bataan–2nd	Tet Garcia	NUP	Joet Garcia	NUP
Batanes	Henedina Abad	Liberal	Henedina Abad	Liberal
Batangas–1st	Eileen Ermita-Buhain	Nacionalista	Eileen Ermita-Buhain	Nacionalista
Batangas–2nd	Raneo Abu	Nacionalista	Raneo Abu	Nacionalista
Batangas–3rd	Sonny Collantes	Liberal	Maria Theresa Collantes	Liberal
Batangas–4th	Mark Llandro Mendoza	NPC	Lianda Bolilia	Liberal
Batangas–5th	New district		Marvey Mariño	Liberal
Batangas–6th	New district		Vilma Santos	Liberal
Benguet	Ronald Cosalan	Liberal	Ronald Cosalan	Liberal
Biliran	Rogelio Espina	Liberal	Rogelio Espina	Liberal
Biñan	New district		Len Alonte	Liberal
Bohol–1st	Rene Relampagos	Liberal	Rene Relampagos	Liberal
Bohol–2nd	Aris Aumentado	NPC	Aris Aumentado	NPC
Bohol–3rd	Arthur C. Yap	NPC	Arthur C. Yap	NPC
Bukidnon–1st	Maria Lourdes Acosta-Alba	Liberal	Maria Lourdes Acosta-Alba	Liberal
Bukidnon–2nd	Florencio Flores Jr.	Nacionalista	Florencio Flores Jr.	Nacionalista
Bukidnon–3rd	Jose Zubiri III	BPP	Manuel Zubiri	BPP
Bukidnon–4th	Rogelio Neil Roque	NPC	Rogelio Neil Roque	NPC
Bulacan–1st	Victoria Sy-Alvarado	Liberal	Jose Antonio Sy-Alvarado	Liberal
Bulacan–2nd	Gavini Pancho	NUP	Gavini Pancho	NUP
Bulacan–3rd	Jonjon Mendoza	Liberal	Lorna Silverio	NUP
Bulacan–4th	Linabelle Villarica	Liberal	Linabelle Villarica	Liberal
Cagayan–1st	Sally Ponce Enrile	NPC	Ramon Nolasco	Liberal
Cagayan–2nd	Baby Alfonso	NUP	Baby Alfonso	NUP
Cagayan–3rd	Randolph Ting	NUP	Randolph Ting	NUP
Cagayan de Oro–1st	Rolando Uy	Liberal	Rolando Uy	Liberal
Cagayan de Oro–2nd	Rufus Rodriguez	CDP	Maximo Rodriguez Jr.	Independent
Caloocan–1st	Enrico Echiverri	NPC	Along Malapitan	Liberal
Caloocan–2nd	Edgar Erice	Liberal	Edgar Erice	Liberal
Camarines Norte–1st	Cathy Barcelona-Reyes	Liberal	Renato Unico Jr.	Liberal
Camarines Norte–2nd	Vacant		Marisol Panotes	Liberal
Camarines Sur–1st	Rolando Andaya Jr.	NPC	Rolando Andaya Jr.	NPC
Camarines Sur–2nd	Dato Arroyo	NPC	Luis Raymund Villafuerte	Nacionalista
Camarines Sur–3rd	Leni Robredo	Liberal	Gabriel Bordado	Liberal
Camarines Sur–4th	Felix William Fuentebella	NPC	Arnulfo Fuentebella	NPC
Camarines Sur–5th	Salvio Fortuno	Liberal	Salvio Fortuno	Liberal
Camiguin	Xavier Jesus Romualdo	Liberal	Xavier Jesus Romualdo	Liberal
Capiz–1st	Antonio del Rosario	Liberal	Tawi Billones	Liberal
Capiz–2nd	Fredenil Castro	NUP	Fredenil Castro	NUP
Catanduanes	Cesar Sarmiento	Liberal	Cesar Sarmiento	Liberal
Cavite–1st	Francis Gerald Abaya	Liberal	Francis Gerald Abaya	Liberal
Cavite–2nd	Lani Mercado	Lakas	Strike Revilla	Lakas
Cavite–3rd	Alex Advincula	Liberal	Alex Advincula	Liberal
Cavite–4th	Elpidio Barzaga Jr.	NUP	Jenny Barzaga	NUP
Cavite–5th	Roy Loyola	Liberal	Roy Loyola	Liberal
Cavite–6th	Luis Ferrer IV	NUP	Luis Ferrer IV	NUP
Cavite–7th	Abraham Tolentino	Liberal	Abraham Tolentino	Liberal
Cebu–1st	Samsam Gullas	Nacionalista	Samsam Gullas	Nacionalista
Cebu–2nd	Wilfredo Caminero	Liberal	Wilfredo Caminero	Liberal
Cebu–3rd	Gwendolyn Garcia	UNA	Gwendolyn Garcia	UNA
Cebu–4th	Benhur Salimbangon	NUP	Benhur Salimbangon	NUP
Cebu–5th	Ace Durano	NPC	Ramon Durano VI	NPC
Cebu–6th	Luigi Quisumbing	Liberal	Jonas Cortes	Liberal
Cebu–7th	New district		Peter John Calderon	Liberal
Cebu City–1st	Raul del Mar	Liberal	Raul del Mar	Liberal
Cebu City–2nd	Rodrigo Abellanosa	Liberal	Rodrigo Abellanosa	Liberal
Compostela Valley–1st	Maricar Zamora	Liberal	Maricar Zamora	Liberal
Compostela Valley–2nd	Rommel Amatong	Aksyon	Ruwel Peter Gonzaga	Liberal
Cotabato–1st	Jesus Sacdalan	Liberal	Jesus Sacdalan	Liberal
Cotabato–2nd	Nancy Catamco	Liberal	Nancy Catamco	Liberal
Cotabato–3rd	Jose Tejada	Liberal	Jose Tejada	Liberal
Davao City–1st	Karlo Nograles	NUP	Karlo Nograles	NUP
Davao City–2nd	Mylene Garcia-Albano	Liberal	Mylene Garcia-Albano	Liberal
Davao City–3rd	Isidro Ungab	PDP–Laban	Alberto Ungab	Nacionalista
Davao del Norte–1st	Antonio Rafael del Rosario	Liberal	Pantaleon Alvarez	PDP–Laban
Davao del Norte–2nd	Antonio Lagdameo Jr.	NUP	Antonio Floirendo Jr.	Kusog Baryohanon
Davao del Sur	Mercedes Cagas	Nacionalista	Mercedes Cagas	Nacionalista
Davao Occidental	Franklin Bautista	Liberal	Lorna Bautista-Bandigan	Liberal
Davao Oriental–1st	Nelson Dayanghirang Sr.	Liberal	Corazon Malanyaon	Nacionalista
Davao Oriental–2nd	Thelma Almario	NPC	Joel Mayo Almario	Liberal
Dinagat Islands	Kaka Bag-ao	Liberal	Kaka Bag-ao	Liberal
Eastern Samar	Ben Evardone	Liberal	Ben Evardone	Liberal
Guimaras	JC Rahman Nava	Liberal	Lucille Nava	Liberal
Ifugao	Teddy Baguilat	Liberal	Teddy Baguilat	Liberal
Iligan	Vicente Belmonte Jr.	Liberal	Frederick Siao	UNA
Ilocos Norte–1st	Rodolfo Fariñas	Liberal	Rodolfo Fariñas	Liberal
Ilocos Norte–2nd	Imelda Marcos	Nacionalista	Imelda Marcos	Nacionalista
Ilocos Sur–1st	Ronald Singson	Nacionalista	Deogracias Victor Savellano	Nacionalista
Ilocos Sur–2nd	Eric Singson	Liberal	Eric Singson	Liberal
Iloilo–1st	Richard Garin	Liberal	Richard Garin	Liberal
Iloilo–2nd	Arcadio Gorriceta	Liberal	Arcadio Gorriceta	Liberal
Iloilo–3rd	Arthur Defensor Jr.	Liberal	Arthur Defensor Jr.	Liberal
Iloilo–4th	Hernan Biron Jr.	NUP	Ferjenel Biron	NUP
Iloilo–5th	Niel Tupas Jr.	Liberal	Raul Tupas	NPC
Iloilo City	Jerry Treñas	Liberal	Jerry Treñas	Liberal
Isabela–1st	Rodolfo Albano III	Nacionalista	Rodolfo Albano III	Nacionalista
Isabela–2nd	Anna Cristina Go	Liberal	Anna Cristina Go	Liberal
Isabela–3rd	Napoleon Dy	NPC	Napoleon Dy	NPC
Isabela–4th	Giorgidi Aggabao	NPC	Maria Lourdes Aggabao	NPC
Kalinga	Manuel Agyao	Liberal	Allen Jesse Mangaoang	Liberal
La Union–1st	Victor Ortega	Liberal	Pablo Ortega	Liberal
La Union–2nd	Eufranio Eriguel	NPC	Sandra Eriguel	NPC
Laguna–1st	Dan Fernandez	Liberal	Arlene Arcillas	Liberal
Laguna–2nd	Jun Chipeco	Liberal	Jun Chipeco	Liberal
Laguna–3rd	Sol Aragones	UNA	Sol Aragones	UNA
Laguna–4th	Benjamin Agarao Jr.	Liberal	Benjamin Agarao Jr.	Liberal
Lanao del Norte–1st	Imelda Dimaporo	Liberal	Mohamad Khalid Dimaporo	Liberal
Lanao del Norte–2nd	Abdullah D. Dimaporo	NPC	Abdullah D. Dimaporo	NPC
Lanao del Sur–1st	Ansaruddin Alonto Adiong	Liberal	Ansaruddin Alonto Adiong	Liberal
Lanao del Sur–2nd	Pangalian Balindong	Independent	Mauyag Papandayan Jr.	PDP–Laban
Lapu-Lapu City	Aileen Radaza	Liberal	Aileen Radaza	Liberal
Las Piñas	Mark Villar	Nacionalista	Mark Villar	Nacionalista
Leyte–1st	Martin Romualdez	Lakas	Yedda Marie Romualdez	Lakas
Leyte–2nd	Sergio Apostol	Liberal	Henry Ong	NPC
Leyte–3rd	Andres Salvacion Jr.	Liberal	Vicente Veloso III	NUP
Leyte–4th	Lucy Torres-Gomez	Liberal	Lucy Torres-Gomez	Liberal
Leyte–5th	Jose Carlos Cari	Liberal	Jose Carlos Cari	Liberal
Maguindanao–1st	Bai Sandra Sema	Liberal	Bai Sandra Sema	Liberal
Maguindanao–2nd	Zajid Mangudadatu	Liberal	Zajid Mangudadatu	Liberal
Makati–1st	Monique Lagdameo	UNA	Monsour del Rosario	UNA
Makati–2nd	Abigail Binay	UNA	Luis Campos	UNA
Malabon	Josephine Lacson-Noel	NPC	Ricky Sandoval	NPC
Mandaluyong	Neptali Gonzales II	Liberal	Alexandria Gonzales	Liberal
Manila–1st	Benjamin Asilo	Liberal	Manny Lopez	NPC
Manila–2nd	Carlo Lopez	Liberal	Carlo Lopez	Liberal
Manila–3rd	Zenaida Angping	NPC	Yul Servo	Asenso Manileño
Manila–4th	Trisha Bonoan-David	NUP	Edward Maceda	Asenso Manileño
Manila–5th	Amado Bagatsing	KABAKA	Cristal Bagatsing	KABAKA
Manila–6th	Rosenda Ann Ocampo	Liberal	Rosenda Ann Ocampo	Liberal
Marikina–1st	Marcelino Teodoro	NPC	Bayani Fernando	NPC
Marikina–2nd	Miro Quimbo	Liberal	Miro Quimbo	Liberal
Marinduque	Lord Allan Velasco	NUP	Lord Allan Velasco	NUP
Masbate–1st	Maria Vida Espinosa-Bravo	NUP	Maria Vida Espinosa-Bravo	NUP
Masbate–2nd	Elisa Olga Kho	Nacionalista	Elisa Olga Kho	Nacionalista
Masbate–3rd	Scott Davies Lanete	NPC	Scott Davies Lanete	NPC
Misamis Occidental–1st	Jorge Almonte	Liberal	Jorge Almonte	Liberal
Misamis Occidental–2nd	Henry Oaminal	Nacionalista	Henry Oaminal	Nacionalista
Misamis Oriental–1st	Peter Unabia	Liberal	Peter Unabia	Liberal
Misamis Oriental–2nd	Juliette Uy	NUP	Juliette Uy	NUP
Mountain Province	Maximo Dalog	Liberal	Maximo Dalog	Liberal
Muntinlupa	Rodolfo Biazon	Liberal	Ruffy Biazon	Liberal
Navotas	Toby Tiangco	UNA	Toby Tiangco	UNA
Negros Occidental–1st	Jules Ledesma	NPC	Melecio Yap	NPC
Negros Occidental–2nd	Leo Rafael Cueva	NUP	Leo Rafael Cueva	NUP
Negros Occidental–3rd	Albee Benitez	Independent	Albee Benitez	Independent
Negros Occidental–4th	Jeffrey Ferrer	NUP	Juliet Marie Ferrer	NUP
Negros Occidental–5th	Alejandro Mirasol	Liberal	Alejandro Mirasol	Liberal
Negros Occidental–6th	Mercedes Alvarez	NPC	Mercedes Lansang	NPC
Negros Oriental–1st	Manuel Iway	Liberal	Jocelyn Sy-Limkaichong	Liberal
Negros Oriental–2nd	George Arnaiz	NPC	Chiquiting Sagarbarria	NPC
Negros Oriental–3rd	Pryde Henry Teves	NPC	Arnie Teves	NPC
Northern Samar–1st	Harlin Abayon	Nacionalista	Raul Daza	Liberal
Northern Samar–2nd	Emil Ong	NUP	Edwin Ongchuan	NUP
Nueva Ecija–1st	Estrellita Suansing	Liberal	Estrellita Suansing	Liberal
Nueva Ecija–2nd	Joseph Gilbert Violago	Liberal	Micaela Violago	Liberal
Nueva Ecija–3rd	Czarina Umali	Liberal	Rosanna Vergara	NPC
Nueva Ecija–4th	Magnolia Antonino-Nadres	UNA	Magnolia Antonino-Nadres	UNA
Nueva Vizcaya	Carlos Padilla	Nacionalista	Luisa Cuaresma	UNA
Occidental Mindoro	Josephine Sato	Liberal	Josephine Sato	Liberal
Oriental Mindoro–1st	Paulino Salvador Leachon	Liberal	Paulino Salvador Leachon	Liberal
Oriental Mindoro–2nd	Reynaldo Umali	Liberal	Reynaldo Umali	Liberal
Palawan–1st	Franz Alvarez	NUP	Franz Alvarez	NUP
Palawan–2nd	Frederick Abueg	Liberal	Frederick Abueg	Liberal
Palawan–3rd	Douglas Hagedorn	Liberal	Gil Acosta	NPC
Pampanga–1st	Yeng Guiao	Liberal	Carmelo Lazatin II	Lingap Lugud
Pampanga–2nd	Gloria Macapagal Arroyo	Lakas	Gloria Macapagal Arroyo	Lakas
Pampanga–3rd	Oscar Samson Rodriguez	Liberal	Aurelio Gonzales Jr.	NPC
Pampanga–4th	Juan Pablo Bondoc	Nacionalista	Juan Pablo Bondoc	Nacionalista
Pangasinan–1st	Jesus Celeste	NPC	Jesus Celeste	NPC
Pangasinan–2nd	Leopoldo Bataoil	Liberal	Leopoldo Bataoil	Liberal
Pangasinan–3rd	Rose Marie Arenas	Liberal	Rose Marie Arenas	Liberal
Pangasinan–4th	Gina de Venecia	NPC	Christopher de Venecia	Liberal
Pangasinan–5th	Carmen Cojuangco	NPC	Amado Espino Jr.	Aksyon
Pangasinan–6th	Marlyn Primicias-Agabas	NPC	Marlyn Primicias-Agabas	NPC
Parañaque–1st	Eric Olivarez	Liberal	Eric Olivarez	Liberal
Parañaque–2nd	Gustavo Tambunting	UNA	Gustavo Tambunting	UNA
Pasay	Emi Rubiano	Liberal	Emi Rubiano	Liberal
Pasig	Roman Romulo	Independent	Richard Eusebio	Nacionalista
Quezon–1st	Mark Enverga	NPC	Trina Enverga	NPC
Quezon–2nd	Vicente Alcala	Liberal	Vicente Alcala	Liberal
Quezon–3rd	Aleta Suarez	UNA	Danilo Suarez	UNA
Quezon–4th	Angelina Tan	NPC	Angelina Tan	NPC
Quezon City–1st	Francisco Calalay	Liberal	Vincent Crisologo	PDP–Laban
Quezon City–2nd	Winston Castelo	Liberal	Winston Castelo	Liberal
Quezon City–3rd	Jorge Banal Jr.	Liberal	Jorge Banal Jr.	Liberal
Quezon City–4th	Feliciano Belmonte Jr.	Liberal	Feliciano Belmonte Jr.	Liberal
Quezon City–5th	Alfred Vargas	Liberal	Alfred Vargas	Liberal
Quezon City–6th	Kit Belmonte	Liberal	Kit Belmonte	Liberal
Quirino	Dakila Cua	Liberal	Dakila Cua	Liberal
Rizal–1st	Joel Duavit	NPC	Jack Duavit	NPC
Rizal–2nd	Isidro Rodriguez Jr.	NPC	Isidro Rodriguez Jr.	NPC
Romblon	Eleandro Jesus Madrona	Nacionalista	Emmanuel Madrona	Nacionalista
Samar–1st	Vacant		Edgar Mary Sarmiento	Liberal
Samar–2nd	Milagrosa Tan	NPC	Milagrosa Tan	NPC
San Jose del Monte	Arthur Robes	Liberal	Florida Robes	AR
San Juan	Ronaldo Zamora	Nacionalista	Ronaldo Zamora	Nacionalista
Sarangani	Manny Pacquiao	UNA	Rogelio Pacquiao	PCM
Siquijor	Marie Anne Pernes	Liberal	Ramon Vicente Rocamora	Independent
Sorsogon–1st	Evelina Escudero	NPC	Evelina Escudero	NPC
Sorsogon–2nd	Deogracias Ramos Jr.	Liberal	Deogracias Ramos Jr.	Liberal
South Cotabato–1st	Pedro Acharon Jr.	NPC	Pedro Acharon Jr.	NPC
South Cotabato–2nd	Dinand Hernandez	NPC	Dinand Hernandez	NPC
Southern Leyte	Damian Mercado	Liberal	Roger Mercado	Liberal
Sultan Kudarat–1st	Raden Sakaluran	PTM	Suharto Mangudadatu	PTM
Sultan Kudarat–2nd	Arnulfo Go	NUP	Horacio Suansing Jr.	Liberal
Sulu–1st	Tupay Loong	Liberal	Tupay Loong	Liberal
Sulu–2nd	Maryam Arbison	Liberal	Abdulmunir Arbison	Liberal
Surigao del Norte–1st	Francisco Matugas	Liberal	Francisco Jose Matugas II	Liberal
Surigao del Norte–2nd	Guillermo Romarate Jr.	Nacionalista	Ace Barbers	Nacionalista
Surigao del Sur–1st	Philip Pichay	Lakas	Prospero Pichay Jr.	Lakas
Surigao del Sur–2nd	Florencio Garay	NPC	Johnny Pimentel	Liberal
Taguig–Pateros	Arnel Cerafica	Liberal	Arnel Cerafica	Liberal
Taguig	Lino Cayetano	Nacionalista	Pia Cayetano	Nacionalista
Tarlac–1st	Vacant		Charlie Cojuangco	NPC
Tarlac–2nd	Susan Yap	NPC	Victor Yap	NPC
Tarlac–3rd	Noel Villanueva	NPC	Noel Villanueva	NPC
Tawi-Tawi	Ruby Sahali	Liberal	Ruby Sahali	Liberal
Valenzuela–1st	Win Gatchalian	NPC	Wes Gatchalian	Independent
Valenzuela–2nd	Magi Gunigundo	Liberal	Eric Martinez	PDP–Laban
Zambales–1st	Jeffrey Khonghun	Liberal	Jeffrey Khonghun	Liberal
Zambales–2nd	Cheryl Deloso-Montalla	Liberal	Cheryl Deloso-Montalla	Liberal
Zamboanga City–1st	Celso Lobregat	LDP	Celso Lobregat	LDP
Zamboanga City–2nd	Lilia Macrohon-Nuño	Nacionalista	Mannix Dalipe	NPC
Zamboanga del Norte–1st	Bullet Jalosjos	Nacionalista	Bullet Jalosjos	Nacionalista
Zamboanga del Norte–2nd	Rosendo Labadlabad	Liberal	Glona Labadlabad	Liberal
Zamboanga del Norte–3rd	Isagani Amatong	Liberal	Isagani Amatong	Liberal
Zamboanga del Sur–1st	Victor Yu	NPC	Divina Grace Yu	NPC
Zamboanga del Sur–2nd	Aurora E. Cerilles	NPC	Aurora E. Cerilles	NPC
Zamboanga Sibugay–1st	Belma Cabilao	Nacionalista	Wilter Palma II	Liberal
Zamboanga Sibugay–2nd	Dulce Ann Hofer	Liberal	Dulce Ann Hofer	Liberal

=== Party-list result ===
The winning party-lists were proclaimed on May 19. The commission proclaimed 46 party-lists, with Ako Bicol winning the maximum three seats, while parties with at least 2% of the vote being guaranteed at least 1 seat. Eleven parties won 2 seats each, while 34 others won one seat each.

Ako Bicol won three seats for the second time in history, after achieving the same feat in 2010. Bayan Muna, on the other hand, failed to win at least 2 seats for the first time, after winning the maximum three seats in 2001, 2004 and 2007.

Party	Votes	%	+/–	Seats	+/–
Ako Bicol Political Party	1,664,975	5.14	+2.38	3	+1
Gabriela Women's Party	1,367,795	4.22	+1.64	2	0
1-Pacman Party List	1,310,197	4.05	New	2	New
Alliance of Concerned Teachers	1,180,752	3.65	+2.00	2	+1
Senior Citizens Partylist	988,876	3.05	+0.60	2	0
Kabalikat ng Mamamayan	840,393	2.60	New	2	New
AGRI Partylist	833,821	2.58	+1.25	2	+1
PBA Partylist	780,309	2.41	+1.64	2	New
Buhay Party-List	760,912	2.35	−2.25	2	−1
Abono Partylist	732,060	2.26	−0.52	2	0
Anak Mindanao	706,689	2.18	+0.80	2	+1
Coop-NATCCO	671,699	2.07	−0.25	2	0
Akbayan	608,449	1.88	−1.12	1	−1
Bayan Muna	606,566	1.87	−1.58	1	−1
AGAP Partylist	593,748	1.83	−0.31	1	−1
An Waray (Note: An Waray was granted a second representative in 2013 without a proclamation from the Commission on Elections; the seat change refers to the de jure ruling, where An Waray is only entitled to one seat from 2013 and is unchanged in 2016, against the de facto 2 seats occupied by the party as the result of the 2013 election.)	590,895	1.82	−0.13	1	0
Citizens' Battle Against Corruption	555,760	1.72	−0.40	1	−1
AAMBIS-Owa Party List	495,483	1.53	+0.40	1	0
Kalinga Partylist	494,725	1.53	+0.18	1	0
A Teacher Partylist	475,488	1.47	−2.31	1	−1
You Against Corruption and Poverty	471,173	1.46	+0.13	1	0
Democratic Independent Workers Association	467,794	1.44	+0.21	1	0
Trade Union Congress Party	467,275	1.44	+0.11	1	0
Abang Lingkod	466,701	1.44	+0.50	1	0
LPG Marketers Association	466,103	1.44	+0.10	1	0
Alliance of Organizations Networks and Associations of the Philippines	434,856	1.34	New	1	New
SAGIP Partylist	397,064	1.23	+0.18	1	0
Butil Farmers Party	395,011	1.22	−0.37	1	0
Acts-Overseas Filipino Workers Coalition of Organizations	374,601	1.16	New	1	New
Anakpawis	367,376	1.13	−0.03	1	0
Ang Kabuhayan	348,533	1.08	New	1	New
Angkla: ang Partido ng Pilipinong Marino	337,245	1.04	−0.26	1	0
Ang Mata'y Alagaan	331,285	1.02	+0.14	1	New
1st Consumers Alliance for Rural Energy	329,627	1.02	−2.37	1	−1
Ang National Coalition of Indigenous Peoples Action Na!	318,257	0.98	+0.11	1	0
Arts Business and Science Professionals	301,457	0.93	−0.37	1	0
Kabataan	300,420	0.93	−0.31	1	0
Bagong Henerasyon	299,381	0.92	+0.24	1	New
Ating Aagapay Sentrong Samahan ng mga Obrero	294,281	0.91	+0.67	1	New
Serbisyo sa Bayan Party	280,465	0.87	New	1	New
Magdalo para sa Pilipino	279,356	0.86	−1.19	1	−1
Una ang Edukasyon	278,393	0.86	New	1	New
Manila Teachers Party-List	268,613	0.83	New	1	New
Kusug Tausug	247,487	0.76	New	1	New
Aangat Tayo	243,266	0.75	−0.00	1	New
Agbiag! Timpuyog Ilocano	240,723	0.74	−0.13	1	0
Ating Guro	237,566	0.73	−0.04	0	0
Association for Development Dedicated to Agriculture and Fisheries	226,751	0.70	New	0	0
Abyan Ilonggo	223,880	0.69	New	0	0
Alliance of Philippine Fishing Federations	220,599	0.68	New	0	0
Append	219,218	0.68	−0.18	0	−1
Ang Nars	218,593	0.68	−0.21	0	−1
Abakada Guro	216,405	0.67	−0.22	0	−1
Confederation of Savings and Loan Association	213,814	0.66	New	0	0
Tingog Sinirangan (Tinig ng Silangan)	210,552	0.65	New	0	0
Abante Mindanao	209,276	0.65	−1.04	0	−1
OFW Family Club	203,767	0.63	−2.09	0	−2
Alagaan Natin Ating Kalusugan	191,362	0.59	New	0	0
Alay Buhay Community Development Foundation	186,712	0.58	−0.57	0	−1
Abante Retirees Organization	166,138	0.51	−0.07	0	0
Ako ang Bisaya	162,547	0.50	New	0	0
Alliance of Volunteer Educators	157,792	0.49	−0.49	0	−1
Rebolusyong Alyansang Makabansa	153,743	0.47	New	0	0
Katipunan ng mga Guardians Brotherhood	148,869	0.46	New	0	0
Alyansa ng mga Grupong Haligi ng Agham at Teknolohiya para sa Mamamayan	140,661	0.43	−0.04	0	0
Anti-War/Anti Terror Mindanao Peace Movement	138,040	0.43	+0.28	0	0
Tanggol Maralita	136,555	0.42	New	0	0
Academicians Students and Educators Alliance	125,069	0.39	New	0	0
Allied Movement Employment Protection Assistance for Overseas Filipino Workers Access Center	121,086	0.37	New	0	0
Adikhaing Tinataguyod ng Kooperatiba	120,361	0.37	−0.60	0	−1
Kasangga sa Kaunlaran	120,042	0.37	−0.36	0	0
Ugnayan ng Maralita Laban sa Kahirapan	118,149	0.36	+0.20	0	0
Disabled/Pilipinos with Disabilities	118,043	0.36	New	0	0
Global Workers and Family Federation	117,552	0.36	New	0	0
Association of Laborers and Employees	112,052	0.35	−0.21	0	0
Cancer Alleviation Network on Care Education and Rehabilitation	109,965	0.34	New	0	0
ACT-CIS Partylist	109,300	0.34	−1.03	0	−1
Aagapay sa Matatanda	102,583	0.32	−0.57	0	−1
Marino Samahan ng mga Seaman	102,430	0.32	New	0	0
Isang Pangarap na Bahay sa Bagong Buhay ng Maralitang Kababayan	100,746	0.31	−0.11	0	0
Movement for Economic Transformation and Righteous Opportunities	94,515	0.29	New	0	0
PISTON Land Transportation Coalition	89,384	0.28	−0.36	0	0
Sanlakas	87,351	0.27	−0.04	0	0
TGP Partylist	87,009	0.27	New	0	0
Kaagapay ng Nagkakaisang Agilang Pilipinong Magsasaka / Kabuhayan at Kabahayan ng mga Magsasaka	79,178	0.24	New	0	0
Migrante Sectoral Party of Overseas Filipinos and their Families	76,523	0.24	+0.05	0	0
Association of Marine Officer and Ratings	68,226	0.21	New	0	0
Isang Alyansang Aalalay sa Pinoy Skilled Workers	65,459	0.20	−0.39	0	0
Sinag Tungo sa Kaunlaran	61,393	0.19	New	0	0
Akbay Kalusugan	56,809	0.18	New	0	0
One Advocacy for Health Progress and Opportunity	54,550	0.17	New	0	0
Ang Pro-Life	53,078	0.16	−0.31	0	0
Sandigan ng mga Manggagawa sa Konstruksyon	52,251	0.16	New	0	0
Tribal Communities Association of the Philippines	50,401	0.16	New	0	0
Union of Nationalist Democratic Filipino Organization	49,742	0.15	New	0	0
Central Luzon Alliance for Socialized Education	49,212	0.15	New	0	0
Tinderong Pinoy Party	46,942	0.14	New	0	0
Partido ng Bayan ang Bida	46,853	0.14	New	0	0
Kapatirang Magmamais ng Pilipinas	46,521	0.14	New	0	0
Guardians Brotherhood	46,182	0.14	New	0	0
Kaisahan ng mga Maliliit na Magsasaka	42,935	0.13	New	0	0
Partido ng Manggagawa	42,742	0.13	New	0	0
Kilos Mamamayan Ngayon Na	39,777	0.12	New	0	0
Federation of International Cable TV and Telecommunications Association of the Philippines	36,619	0.11	New	0	0
Anak Central Party	35,270	0.11	New	0	0
Barangay Natin	31,185	0.10	New	0	0
Ang Tao Muna at Bayan	30,147	0.09	New	0	0
Awareness of Keepers of the Environment	28,727	0.09	New	0	0
National Confederation of Tricycle Operators and Drivers Association of the Philippines	24,407	0.08	New	0	0
Alliance for National Urban Poor Organizations Assembly	18,793	0.06	New	0	0
Movement of Women for Change and Reform	17,040	0.05	New	0	0
1-Abilidad	16,805	0.05	−0.02	0	0
Mamamayan Tungo sa Maunlad na Pilipinas	9,200	0.03	−0.12	0	0
Construction Workers Solidarity	9,121	0.03	New	0	0
DUMPER Partylist	6,941	0.02	New	0	0
Total	32,377,841	100.00	–	59	0
Valid votes	32,377,841	71.98	+3.01		
Invalid/blank votes	12,602,521	28.02	−3.01		
Total votes	44,980,362	100.00	–		
Registered voters/turnout	55,739,911	80.70	+4.93		
Source: COMELEC

Vote share
Ako Bikol	5.14%
Gabriela	4.22%
1-PACMAN	4.05%
ACT Teachers	3.65%
Senior Citizens	3.05%
Kabayan	2.60%
AGRI	2.58%
PBA	2.41%
Buhay	2.35%
Abono	2.26%
AMIN	2.18%
Coop-NATCCO	2.07%
Akbayan	1.88%
Others	61.51%

Congressional sectoral seats
Ako Bikol	5.08%
Gabriela	3.39%
1-PACMAN	3.39%
ACT Teachers	3.39%
Senior Citizens	3.39%
Kabayan	3.39%
AGRI	3.39%
PBA	3.39%
Buhay	3.39%
Abono	3.39%
AMIN	3.39%
Coop-NATCCO	3.39%
Akbayan	1.69%
Others	55.93%

=== Summary ===
Region	Details	Seats won per party						Total seats
Region	Details	Liberal	Nacionalista	NPC	NUP	UNA	Others & ind.	Total seats
I	Elections	6 / 12	2 / 12	3 / 12	0 / 12	0 / 12	1 / 12	12 / 297
II	Elections	4 / 10	1 / 10	2 / 10	2 / 10	1 / 10	0 / 10	10 / 297
III	Elections	7 / 21	1 / 21	5 / 21	3 / 21	1 / 21	4 / 21	21 / 297
IV–A	Elections	14 / 26	2 / 26	4 / 26	3 / 26	2 / 26	1 / 26	26 / 297
IV–B	Elections	4 / 8	1 / 8	1 / 8	2 / 8	0 / 8	0 / 8	8 / 297
V	Elections	9 / 16	2 / 16	4 / 16	1 / 16	0 / 16	0 / 16	16 / 297
VI	Elections	7 / 11	0 / 11	2 / 11	2 / 11	0 / 11	0 / 11	11 / 297
VII	Elections	6 / 14	2 / 14	3 / 14	1 / 14	1 / 14	1 / 14	14 / 297
VIII	Elections	7 / 12	0 / 12	2 / 12	2 / 12	0 / 12	1 / 12	12 / 297
IX	Elections	4 / 9	1 / 9	3 / 9	0 / 9	0 / 9	1 / 9	9 / 297
X	Elections	6 / 14	2 / 14	2 / 14	1 / 14	1 / 14	2 / 14	14 / 297
XI	Elections	5 / 11	3 / 11	0 / 11	1 / 11	0 / 11	2 / 11	11 / 297
XII	Elections	4 / 8	0 / 8	2 / 8	0 / 8	0 / 8	2 / 8	8 / 297
XIII	Elections	4 / 9	0 / 9	2 / 9	2 / 9	0 / 9	1 / 9	9 / 297
ARMM	Elections	6 / 8	0 / 8	0 / 8	1 / 8	0 / 8	1 / 8	8 / 297
CAR	Elections	5 / 7	1 / 7	1 / 7	0 / 7	0 / 7	0 / 7	7 / 297
NCR	Elections	15 / 32	4 / 32	3 / 32	0 / 32	5 / 32	5 / 32	32 / 297
NIR	Elections	2 / 10	0 / 10	5 / 10	2 / 10	0 / 10	1 / 10	10 / 297
Party-list	Elections	1 / 59	0 / 59	0 / 59	0 / 59	0 / 59	58 / 59	59 / 297
Total		117 / 297	24 / 297	42 / 297	23 / 297	11 / 297	91 / 297	297 / 297

== Defeated incumbents ==
=== District representatives ===
District	Incumbent's party	Incumbent	Winner	Winner's party	Notes
Aklan	Nacionalista	Teodorico Haresco, Jr.	Carlito Marquez	NPC	
Baguio	Liberal	Nicasio Aliping	Mark Go	Nacionalista	
Bulacan–3rd	Liberal	Jonjon Mendoza	Lorna Silverio	NUP	
Leyte–2nd	Liberal	Sergio Apostol	Henry Ong	NPC	
Northern Samar–1st	Nacionalista	Harlin Abayon	Raul Daza	Liberal	After defeating Daza in 2013 by 52 votes, Abayon lost by 90 votes. Daza had successfully petitioned to the House of Representatives Electoral Tribunal, ousting Abayon, but the Supreme Court ordered the reinstatement of Abayon. The House leadership did not act on the court's order in time after the adjournment sine die.
Palawan–3rd	Liberal	Douglas Hagedorn	Gil Acosta	NPC	
Pampanga–1st	Liberal	Yeng Guiao	Carmelo Lazatin	Lingap Lugud	
Quezon City–1st	Liberal	Boy Calalay	Vincent Crisologo	UNA	Calalay defeated Crisologo in 2013.
Siquijor	Liberal	Marie Anne Pernes	Ramon Vicente Rocamora	Independent	
Zamboanga City–2nd	Nacionalista	Lilia Macrohon-Nuño	Manuel Dalipe	NPC	
Zamboanga Sibugay–1st	Nacionalista	Belma Cabilao	Wilter Palma II	Liberal	

=== Party-list representatives ===
- Alliance of Volunteer Educators
  - Eulogio Magsaysay
- Ang Nars
  - Leah Paquiz
- Append
  - Pablo Nava III

== Aftermath ==
After proclamations were held for district representatives, three people were seen to have a chance in becoming speaker. These include PDP–Laban's Pantaleon Alvarez of Davao del Norte, National Unity Party (NUP)'s Karlo Nograles of Davao City, and incumbent speaker Feliciano Belmonte, Jr. of Quezon City.

Duterte chose PDP–Laban's Alvarez, a returning congressman, over Nograles as his preferred candidate for the speakership. Nograles gave way to Alvarez, to secure a "super majority" in Congress, while keeping the minority bloc to about 20 members.

Alvarez and defeated senatorial candidate Ferdinand Martin Romualdez, chairman of the Lakas–CMD, signed an agreement formalizing their parties' alliance. The Nacionalista Party (NP) also joined the alliance with the PDP–Laban; Duterte's running mate, Senator Alan Peter Cayetano, although ran as an independent, is a member of the Nacionalista Party. The Nationalist People's Coalition (NPC) have also contacted Alvarez about the speakership election, while Alvarez described a coalition with the NUP as a "done deal".

The incumbent speaker, the Liberals' Feliciano Belmonte, Jr. of Quezon City expects the support of at least 120 members of the Liberal Party and allies from other parties. Meanwhile, Alvarez hosted a luncheon at the Midas Hotel and Casino on May 18 where 59 representatives attended. Alvarez said that his "Coalition for Change" includes representatives from the PDP–Laban, the NP, NPC, NUP, Lakas, various party-lists, and even from the Liberal Party.

Days after the Alvarez luncheon, Belmonte conceded the speakership race, saying that Alvarez had the numbers. Alvarez visited Belmonte's home in Quezon City to pave way for a smooth transition of power in the lower house. This was after the NPC affirmed its support for PDP–Laban. Meanwhile, outgoing Majority Leader Neptali Gonzales II said that there are some Liberal representatives who won't jump ship to PDP–Laban, but would still vote for Alvarez for the speakership, with the Liberals signing the same coalition agreement with the NPC, which the latter also signed with PDP–Laban.

Danilo Suarez of Quezon, who ran under the United Nationalist Alliance (UNA) emerged as Belmonte's primary opponent for the minority leader position. Suarez says he has the support of some 17 lawmakers from UNA, Lakas–CMD, and party-list representatives allied with the former. While this is happening, the NUP and Lakas announced a coalition that would support Duterte in the lower house, and backed the election of Alvarez for the speakership.

Alvarez spent the remainder of May consolidating the pro-Duterte forces in the House of Representatives. Belmonte seemed content to lead the opposition in the lower house, rather than joining the majority bloc, saying that "we must have a minority. That's needed." At least 23 representatives abandoned the Liberal Party for PDP–Laban. Meanwhile, the NUP signed a coalition agreement with PDP–Laban, joining the Coalition for Change.

Speakership election
Candidate	Party	Total	%
Pantaleon Alvarez	PDP–Laban	252	84.8%
Teodoro Baguilat, Jr.	Liberal	8	2.7%
Danilo Suarez	Lakas	7	2.4%
Abstention		22	7.4%
Total who voted		288	97.3%
Total representatives		297	100%
