= 2016 Philippine House of Representatives elections in the Negros Island Region =

Elections were held in Negros Island Region (Region XVIII) for seats in the House of Representatives of the Philippines on May 9, 2016.

== Summary ==
| Party | Popular vote | % | Swing | Seats won | Change |
|---|---|---|---|---|---|
| NPC | 465,626 | | | 5 | |
| NUP | 418,457 | | | 2 | |
| Liberal | 246,206 | | | 2 | |
| Independent | 345,493 | | | 1 | |
| Nacionalista | 85,638 | | | | |
| KBL | 3,388 | | | | |
| UNA | 3,032 | | | | |
| Valid votes | 1,567,840 | | | 10 | |
| Invalid votes | 487,526 | | | | |
| Turnout | 2,055,366 | | | | |
| Registered voters | | | | | |

== Bacolod City ==
=== Lone District ===
Evelio Leonardia is the incumbent but he chose to run for mayor.

Philippine House of Representatives election at Bacolod City
| Party | Candidate | Votes | % |
|---|---|---|---|
| NPC | Greg Gasataya | 85,467 | 41.15% |
| NUP | Jude Thaddeus Sayson | 84,431 | 40.65% |
| Liberal | Carlos Jose Lopez | 18,211 | 8.76% |
| Independent | Archie Baribar | 17,460 | 8.40% |
| Independent | Rolando Villamor | 1,491 | 0.71% |
| Independent | Joel David Enriquez | 628 | 0.30% |
| Invalid or blank votes | | 27,953 | |
| Total votes | | 235,641 | 100.00% |

== Negros Occidental ==
Each of Negros Occidental's 6 legislative districts will elect each representative to the House of Representatives. The candidate with the highest number of votes wins the seat.

=== 1st District ===
Julio A. Ledesma IV is the incumbent and term-limited.

Philippine House of Representatives election at Negros Occidental's 1st district
| Party | Candidate | Votes | % |
|---|---|---|---|
| NPC | Melecio Yap | 93,695 | 66.27% |
| Liberal | Santiago Maravillas | 44,298 | 31.33% |
| KBL | Ernesto Librando | 3,388 | 2.39% |
| Invalid or blank votes | | 43,928 | |
| Total votes | | 185,309 | 100.00% |

=== 2nd District ===
Leo Rafael Cueva is the incumbent. He is running unopposed.

Philippine House of Representatives election at Negros Occidental's 2nd district
| Party | Candidate | Votes | % |
|---|---|---|---|
| NUP | Leo Rafael Cueva | 78,611 | 100.00% |
| Invalid or blank votes | | 70,824 | |
| Total votes | | 149,435 | 100.00% |

=== 3rd District ===
Alfredo Abelardo Benitez is the incumbent.

Philippine House of Representatives election at Negros Occidental's 3rd district
| Party | Candidate | Votes | % |
|---|---|---|---|
| Independent | Alfredo Abelardo Benitez | 177,232 | 90.37% |
| NUP | Anthony Puey | 13,393 | 6.82% |
| Independent | Antonio Barello Jr. | 5,488 | 2.79% |
| Invalid or blank votes | | 41,240 | |
| Total votes | | 237,353 | 100.00% |

=== 4th District ===
Jeffrey Ferrer is the incumbent and term-limited. He is running for vice-governor of the province.

Philippine House of Representatives election at Negros Occidental's 4th district
| Party | Candidate | Votes | % |
|---|---|---|---|
| NUP | Juliet Marie Ferrer | 134,580 | 97.01% |
| Independent | Enrique Erobas | 4,159 | 2.99% |
| Invalid or blank votes | | 45,155 | |
| Total votes | | 183,894 | 100.00% |

=== 5th District ===
Alejandro Mirasol is the incumbent.

Philippine House of Representatives election at Negros Occidental's 5th district
| Party | Candidate | Votes | % |
|---|---|---|---|
| Liberal | Alejandro Mirasol | 88,897 | 50.93% |
| Nacionalista | Emilio Yulo III | 85,638 | 49.06% |
| Invalid or blank votes | | 29,260 | |
| Total votes | | 203,795 | 100.00% |

=== 6th District ===
Mercedes Alvarez is the incumbent and running unopposed.

Philippine House of Representatives election at Negros Occidental's 6th district
| Party | Candidate | Votes | % |
|---|---|---|---|
| NPC | Mercedes Alvarez | 129,619 | 100.00% |
| Invalid or blank votes | | 71,396 | |
| Total votes | | 201,015 | 100.00% |

== Negros Oriental ==
Each of Negros Oriental's three legislative districts will elect each representative to the House of Representatives. The candidate with the highest number of votes wins the seat.

=== 1st District ===
Emmanuel Iway is the incumbent but he is running for mayor of La Libertad.

Philippine House of Representatives election at Negros Oriental's 1st district
| Party | Candidate | Votes | % |
|---|---|---|---|
| Liberal | Jocelyn Limkaichong | 94,800 | 60.55% |
| NUP | Jacinto Paras | 60,506 | 38.64% |
| Independent | Danny Roble | 1,252 | 0.79% |
| Invalid or blank votes | | 43,466 | |
| Total votes | | 200,024 | 100.00% |

=== 2nd District ===
George P. Arnaiz is the incumbent and term-limited. He running for governor instead.

Philippine House of Representatives election at Negros Oriental's 2nd district
| Party | Candidate | Votes | % |
|---|---|---|---|
| NPC | Manuel Sagarbarria | 75,077 | 37.89% |
| Independent | Ismail Amolat | 72,548 | 36.61% |
| NUP | Erwin Michael Macias | 46,936 | 23.69% |
| Independent | Ybañez Ryan | 2,060 | 1.03% |
| Independent | Samuel Torres | 1,498 | 0.75% |
| Invalid or blank votes | | 58,011 | |
| Total votes | | 256,130 | 100.00% |

=== 3rd District ===
Pryde Henry Teves is the incumbent and term-limited. He is running for mayor of Bayawan instead. His party nominated his brother Arnulfo Teves Jr.

Philippine House of Representatives election at Negros Oriental's 3rd district
| Party | Candidate | Votes | % |
|---|---|---|---|
| NPC | Arnulfo Teves Jr. | 81,768 | 55.82% |
| Independent | Henry Sojor | 61,677 | 42.10% |
| UNA | Ivy Marie Pergamino | 3,032 | 2.06% |
| Invalid or blank votes | | 56,293 | |
| Total votes | | 202,770 | 100.00% |
