= 2016 Philippine House of Representatives elections in Cagayan Valley =

Elections were held in Cagayan Valley for seats in the House of Representatives of the Philippines on May 9, 2016.

The candidate with the most votes won that district's seat for the 17th Congress of the Philippines.

== Summary ==
Party	Popular vote	%	Swing	Seats won	Change
Liberal	423,442			4	▲2
NPC	308,898			2	▼2
NUP	179,141			2	Steady
Nacionalista	224,215			1	▼1
UNA	91,544			1	▲1
PDP–Laban	63,574			0	
Independent	19,391			0	
PGRP	3,619			0	
Valid votes	1,313,824			10	
Invalid votes	245,086				
Turnout	1,558,910				
Registered voters					

== Batanes ==
Henedina Abad is the incumbent.

2016 Philippine House of Representatives election at Batanes
Party	Candidate	Votes	%
Liberal	Henedina Abad	4,236	
NPC	Efren Lizardo	1,795	
Independent	Alex Narag	1,517	
UNA	Nicanor Abad	1,479	
Margin of victory			
Invalid or blank votes		641	
Total votes		9,668	
Liberal hold			

== Cagayan ==
=== 1st District ===
Incumbent Salvacion Ponce Enrile is not running. Her husband former Representative Jack Enrile is her party's nominee.

2016 Philippine House of Representatives election at Cagayan's 1st district
Party	Candidate	Votes	%
Liberal	Ramon Nolasco	89,123	
NPC	Jack Enrile	75,926	
Margin of victory			
Invalid or blank votes		25,725	
Total votes		190,774	
Liberal gain from NPC			

=== 2nd District ===
Baby Aline Vargas-Alfonso is the incumbent.

2016 Philippine House of Representatives election at Cagayan's 2nd district
Party	Candidate	Votes	%
NUP	Baby Aline Vargas-Alfonso	74,081	
Liberal	Darwin Sacramed	22,256	
Invalid or blank votes		15,895	
Total votes		112,232	
NUP hold			

=== 3rd District ===
Randolph Ting is the incumbent.

2013 Philippine House of Representatives election at Cagayan's 3rd district
Party	Candidate	Votes	%
NUP	Randolph Ting	105,060	
Liberal	Toto Guzman	50,253	
UNA	Isarco Antonio	5,449	
Independent	Carmelo Lasam	4,419	
Margin of victory			
Invalid or blank votes		34,275	
Total votes		199,456	
NUP hold			

== Isabela ==
=== 1st District ===
Incumbent Rodolfo Albano III is running.

2016 Philippine House of Representatives election at Isabela's 1st district
Party	Candidate	Votes	%
Nacionalista	Rodolfo Albano III	139,998	
Independent	Stephen Soliven	2,258	
Margin of victory			
Invalid or blank votes		41,468	
Total votes		183,724	
Nacionalista hold			

=== 2nd District ===
Ana Cristina Go is the incumbent. She changed her party affiliation from Nacionalista to Liberal.

2016 Philippine House of Representatives election at Isabela's 2nd district
Party	Candidate	Votes	%
Liberal	Ana Cristina Go	93,694	
PDP–Laban	Edwin Uy	63,574	
Margin of victory			
Invalid or blank votes		23,494	
Total votes		180,762	
Liberal hold			

=== 3rd District ===
Napoleon Dy is the incumbent and is running unopposed.

2016 Philippine House of Representatives election at Isabela's 3rd district
Party	Candidate	Votes	%
NPC	Napoleon Dy	134,731	
Margin of victory			
Invalid or blank votes		56,888	
Total votes		191,619	
NPC hold			

=== 4th District ===
Giorgidi Aggabao is term limited.

2016 Philippine House of Representatives election at Isabela's 4th district
Party	Candidate	Votes	%
NPC	Nettie Aggabao	96,446	
Liberal	Danilo Tan	75,075	
Independent	Hex Alvarez	9,529	
PGRP	Maximo Dirige	3,619	
Independent	Nick De Guzman	1,037	
Margin of victory			
Invalid or blank votes		21,028	
Total votes		206,734	
NPC hold			

== Nueva Vizcaya ==
Incumbent Carlos M. Padilla is term-limited and is running for Governor. His wife, incumbent Governor Ruth Padilla is his party's nominee.

2016 Philippine House of Representatives election at Nueva Vizcaya
Party	Candidate	Votes	%
UNA	Luisa Cuaresma	84,616	
Nacionalista	Ruth Padilla	84,217	
Liberal	Donna Lyn Gerdan	20,449	
Independent	Lawrence Sta. Ana	631	
Margin of victory			
Invalid or blank votes		11,992	
Total votes		201,905	
UNA gain from Nacionalista			

== Quirino ==
Incumbent Dakila Carlo Cua is running unopposed.

2016 Philippine House of Representatives election at Quirino
Party	Candidate	Votes	%
Liberal	Dakila Carlo Cua	68,356	
Invalid or blank votes		13,680	
Total votes		82,036	
Liberal hold			
