= 2016 Philippine House of Representatives elections in Central Luzon =

Elections were held in Central Luzon for seats in the House of Representatives of the Philippines on May 9, 2016. The candidate with the most votes won that district's seat for the 17th Congress of the Philippines.

The Liberal Party won a total of 7 seats, the most of any political party in Central Luzon, followed by the Nationalist People's Coalition (NPC) with 5 seats, and the National Unity Party (NUP) with 3.

== Summary ==
Party	Popular vote	%	Swing	Seats won	Change
Liberal	1,640,574			7	▼1
NPC	963,183			5	▲2
NUP	563,980			3	▼1
Nacionalista	283,429			1	▼1
UNA	237,811			1	▲1
Lakas	190,631			1	Steady
Lingap Lugud	127,762			1	▲1
AR	83,945			1	▲1
LDP	48,868			1	Steady
Aksyon	64,643			0	
SZP	52,415			0	
PMP	40,685			0	
Independent	40,675			0	
PDP–Laban	11,832			0	
KBL	3,587			0	
KAMBILAN	0			0	▼1
Sigaw	0			0	▼1
Valid votes	4,354,020			21	
Invalid votes	635,356				
Turnout	4,989,376				
Registered voters					

== Aurora ==
Incumbent Bellaflor Angara-Castillo, is running for reelection. Her opponent is former Vice Governor Annabelle Tangson.

2016 Philippine House of Representatives election at Aurora
Party	Candidate	Votes	%
LDP	Bellaflor Angara-Castillo	48,868	
Nacionalista	Annabelle Tangson	48,114	
Margin of victory			
Invalid or blank votes		6,087	
Total votes		103,069	
LDP hold			

== Bataan ==
=== 1st District ===
Incumbent Herminia Roman is term-limited.

2016 Philippine House of Representatives election at Bataan's 1st district
Party	Candidate	Votes	%
Liberal	Geraldine Roman	106,015	
Aksyon	Danny Malana	64,643	
Margin of victory			
Invalid or blank votes		12,274	
Total votes		182,932	
Liberal hold			

=== 2nd District ===
Incumbent Enrique Garcia is not running. His son, incumbent Balanga Mayor Joet Garcia is his party's nominee and is running unopposed.

2016 Philippine House of Representatives election at Bataan's 2nd district
Party	Candidate	Votes	%
NUP	Joet Garcia	177,345	
Invalid or blank votes		52,220	
Total votes		229,565	
NUP hold			

== Bulacan ==
=== 1st District ===
Ma. Victoria Sy-Alvarado is term-limited. She changed her party affiliation from NUP to Liberal. Her son Jose Antonio is her party's nominee.

2016 Philippine House of Representatives election at Bulacan's 1st district
Party	Candidate	Votes	%
Liberal	Jose Antonio Sy-Alvarado	157,828	
NPC	Michael Fermin	118,663	
Margin of victory			
Invalid or blank votes		33,958	
Total votes		310,449	
Liberal hold			

=== 2nd District ===
Gavini "Apol" Pancho is the Incumbent.

2016 Philippine House of Representatives election in Bulacan 2nd District.
Party	Candidate	Votes	%
NUP	Apol Pancho	266,647	
Independent	Jaime Villafuerte	11,609	
KBL	Louie Angeles	3,587	
Invalid or blank votes		49,234	
Total votes		331,077	
NUP hold			

=== 3rd District ===
Joselito Mendoza is the incumbent. His opponent is Former 3rd District Representatives and Former San Rafael Mayor Lorna Silverio.

2016 Philippine House of Representatives election in Bulacan 3rd District.
Party	Candidate	Votes	%
NUP	Lorna Silverio	119,988	
Liberal	Jonjon Mendoza	110,573	
Invalid or blank votes		38,108	
Total votes		268,669	
NUP gain from Liberal			

=== 4th District ===
Linabelle Villarica is the incumbent. Her opponent is Meycauayan City Mayor Joan Alarilla.

2016 Philippine House of Representatives election in Bulacan 4th District.
Party	Candidate	Votes	%
Liberal	Linabelle Villarica	216,963	
NPC	Joan Alarilla	40,043	
Invalid or blank votes		28,778	
Total votes		285,784	
Liberal hold			

== Nueva Ecija ==
=== 1st District ===
Estrelita Suansing is the incumbent. She changed her party affiliation from Unang Sigaw to Liberal.

2016 Philippine House of Representatives election at Nueva Ecija's 1st district
Party	Candidate	Votes	%
Liberal	Estrelita Suansing	145,685	
UNA	Josefina Joson	78,512	
Invalid or blank votes		31,478	
Total votes		255,675	
Liberal hold			

=== 2nd District ===
Joseph Gilbert Violago is term limited.

2016 Philippine House of Representatives election at Nueva Ecija's 2nd district
Party	Candidate	Votes	%
Liberal	Mikki Violago	122,470	
Nacionalista	Lito Violago	86,674	
Invalid or blank votes		14,394	
Total votes		223,538	
Liberal hold			

=== 3rd District ===
Czarina Umali is term limited and she is running for Governor.

2016 Philippine House of Representatives election at Nueva Ecija's 3rd district
Party	Candidate	Votes	%
NPC	Rosanna Vergara	133,256	
Liberal	Aurelio Umali	130,677	
Independent	Gaudencio Castro	804	
Invalid or blank votes		15,956	
Total votes		280,693	
NPC gain from Liberal			

=== 4th District ===
Magnolia Antonino-Nadres is the incumbent. She changed her party affiliation from NUP to UNA.

2016 Philippine House of Representatives election at Nueva Ecija's 4th district
Party	Candidate	Votes	%
UNA	Magnolia Antonino-Nadres	159,299	
Liberal	Pol Interior	69,916	
Independent	Virgilio Bote	6,874	
Independent	Montano Cayanan	2,626	
Invalid or blank votes		46,558	
Total votes		285,273	
UNA hold			

== Pampanga ==
=== 1st District ===
Yeng Guiao is the incumbent. He changed his party affiliation from NUP/KAMBILAN to Liberal. He will face Carmelo "Jon-Jon" Lazatin II, son of former Representative Carmelo "Tarzan" Lazatin, Sr.

2016 Philippine House of Representatives election at Pampanga's 1st district
Party	Candidate	Votes	%
Lingap Lugud	Carmelo "Jon-Jon" Lazatin II	127,762	
Liberal	Yeng Guiao	106,086	
Independent	Edwin Bacay	1,828	
Independent	Juan Pagaran	1,203	
Invalid or blank votes		31,388	
Total votes		268,267	
Lingap Lugud gain from KAMBILAN			

=== 2nd District ===
Incumbent Gloria Macapagal Arroyo is running for her last term unopposed despite her sickness and in-hospital arrest.

2016 Philippine House of Representatives election at Pampanga's 2nd district
Party	Candidate	Votes	%
Lakas	Gloria Macapagal Arroyo	190,631	
Invalid or blank votes		47,599	
Total votes		238,230	
Lakas hold			

=== 3rd District ===
Oscar Samson Rodriguez is the incumbent. He will facing-off former congressman Aurelio Gonzales Jr.

2016 Philippine House of Representatives election at Pampanga's 3rd district
Party	Candidate	Votes	%
NPC	Aurelio Gonzales Jr.	137,786	
Liberal	Oscar Samson Rodriguez	123,935	
Independent	Pol Quiwa	3,260	
Independent	Amado Santos	3,069	
Invalid or blank votes		25,113	
Total votes		293,163	
NPC gain from Liberal			

=== 4th District ===
Juan Pablo Bondoc is the incumbent.

2016 Philippine House of Representatives election at Pampanga's 4th district
Party	Candidate	Votes	%
Nacionalista	Juan Pablo Bondoc	148,641	
NPC	Oscar Jun Tetangco	85,643	
Invalid or blank votes		19,933	
Total votes		254,217	
Nacionalista hold			

== San Jose del Monte ==
Incumbent Arthur Robes is running for Mayor, His wife Florida is running against Incumbent Vice Mayor Eduardo Roquero, Jr.

2016 Philippine House of Representatives election in San Jose del Monte, Bulacan Lone District
Party	Candidate	Votes	%
AR	Florida Robes	83,945	
Liberal	Eduardo Roquero, Jr.	75,692	
Invalid or blank votes		15,423	
Total votes		175,060	
AR gain from Liberal			

== Tarlac ==
=== 1st District ===
2016 Philippine House of Representatives election in Tarlac's 1st District.
Party	Candidate	Votes	%
NPC	Carlos Charlie Cojuangco	151,199	
Independent	Cristino Diamsay	7,859	
Invalid or blank votes		49,331	
Total votes		208,389	
NPC hold			

=== 2nd District ===
2016 Philippine House of Representatives election in Tarlac's 2nd District.
Party	Candidate	Votes	%
NPC	Victor Yap	165,982	
PMP	Florentino Galang	40,685	
Independent	Joseph Doloricon	1,543	
Invalid or blank votes		33,056	
Total votes		241,266	
NPC hold			

=== 3rd District ===
Noel Villanueva is the incumbent. He changed his party affiliation from Nacionalista to NPC.

2016 Philippine House of Representatives election at Tarlac's 3rd district
Party	Candidate	Votes	%
NPC	Noel Villanueva	130,611	
Invalid or blank votes		48,476	
Total votes		179,087	
NPC hold			

== Zambales ==
=== 1st District ===
Jeffrey Khonghun is the incumbent.

2016 Philippine House of Representatives election in Zambales 1st District
Party	Candidate	Votes	%
Liberal	Jeffrey Khonghun	146,773	
PDP–Laban	Michael Macapagal	11,832	
Invalid or blank votes		15,574	
Total votes		174,179	
Liberal hold			

=== 2nd District ===
Cheryl Deloso-Montalla is the incumbent.

2016 Philippine House of Representatives election in Zambales 2nd District
Party	Candidate	Votes	%
Liberal	Cheryl Deloso-Montalla	127,961	
SZP	Reinhard Jeresano	52,415	
Invalid or blank votes		20,418	
Total votes		200,794	
Liberal hold			
