= 2016 Philippine House of Representatives elections in Eastern Visayas =

Elections were held in Eastern Visayas for seats in the House of Representatives of the Philippines on May 9, 2016.

== Summary ==
| Party | Popular vote | % | Swing | Seats won | Change |
|---|---|---|---|---|---|
| Liberal | 936,290 | 49.33% | ▲1.65% | 7 | Steady |
| Nacionalista | 251,530 | 13.25% | ▲0.41% | 0 | ▼1 |
| NPC | 232,782 | 12.26% | ▲7.37% | 2 | ▲1 |
| Lakas | 147,477 | 7.77% | ▼4.15% | 1 | Steady |
| NUP | 110,986 | 5.85% | ▼5.47% | 2 | Steady |
| Aksyon | 82,557 | 4.35% | ▲4.35% | 0 | Steady |
| UNA | 78,031 | 4.11% | ▲0.67% | 0 | Steady |
| Independent | 57,391 | 3.02% | ▲2.81% | 0 | Steady |
| PDP–Laban | 943 | 0.05% | ▼0.63% | 0 | Steady |
| Valid votes | 1,897,987 | 82.15% | | 12 | |
| Invalid votes | 412,265 | 17.85% | | | |
| Turnout | 2,310,252 | 85.60% | | | |
| Registered voters | 2,698,880 | 100.00% | | | |

== Biliran ==
Rogelio Espina is the incumbent and running unopposed.

Philippine House of Representatives election at Biliran's Lone district
| Party | Candidate | Votes | % |
|---|---|---|---|
| Liberal | Rogelio Espina | 54,844 | 100.00% |
| Valid ballots | | 54,844 | 61.95% |
| Invalid or blank votes | | 33,688 | 38.05% |
| Total votes | | 88,532 | 100.00% |
| Liberal hold | | | |

== Eastern Samar ==
Ben Evardone is the incumbent.

Philippine House of Representatives election at Eastern Samar's lone district
| Party | Candidate | Votes | % |
|---|---|---|---|
| Liberal | Ben Evardone | 132,089 | 58.32% |
| Nacionalista | Annaliz Gonzales-Kwan | 94,388 | 41.68% |
| Valid ballots | | 226,477 | 88.32% |
| Margin of victory | | 37,701 | 16.65% |
| Invalid or blank votes | | 29,959 | 11.68% |
| Total votes | | 256,436 | 100.00% |
| Liberal hold | | | |

== Leyte ==
Each of Leyte's 5 others legislative districts will elect each representative to the House of Representatives. The candidate with the highest number of votes wins the seat.

=== 1st District ===
Ferdinand Martin G. Romualdez is the incumbent but ineligible for reelection. He is running for senate instead. His party nominates his wife and former beauty queen Yedda Marie Romualdez

Philippine House of Representatives election at Leyte's 1st district
| Party | Candidate | Votes | % |
|---|---|---|---|
| Lakas | Yedda Romualdez | 147,477 | 73.66% |
| Independent | Fiel Clemencio | 51,550 | 25.75% |
| Independent | Ka-Poly Jacla | 1,191 | 0.59% |
| Valid ballots | | 200,218 | 81.29% |
| Margin of victory | | 95,927 | 47.91% |
| Invalid or blank votes | | 46,082 | 18.71% |
| Total votes | | 246,300 | 100.00% |
| Lakas hold | | | |

=== 2nd District ===
Sergio Antonio Apostol is the incumbent.

Philippine House of Representatives election at Leyte's 2nd district
| Party | Candidate | Votes | % |
|---|---|---|---|
| NPC | Henry Ong | 95,534 | 52.64% |
| Liberal | Sergio Antonio Apostol | 82,768 | 45.60% |
| Independent | Alberto Hidalgo | 2,249 | 1.24% |
| PDP–Laban | Gary Ramos | 943 | 0.52% |
| Valid ballots | | 181,494 | 85.43% |
| Margin of victory | | 12,766 | 7.03% |
| Invalid or blank votes | | 30,951 | 14.57% |
| Total votes | | 212,445 | 100.00% |
| NPC gain from Liberal | | | |

=== 3rd District ===
Andres D. Salvacion Jr. is the incumbent but ineligible for reelection.

Philippine House of Representatives election at Leyte's 3rd district
| Party | Candidate | Votes | % |
|---|---|---|---|
| NUP | Ching Veloso | 43,333 | 50.03% |
| Liberal | Tingting Salvacion | 43,277 | 49.97% |
| Valid ballots | | 86,610 | 88.05% |
| Margin of victory | | 56 | 0.06% |
| Invalid or blank votes | | 11,754 | 11.95% |
| Total votes | | 98,364 | 100.00% |
| NUP gain from Liberal | | | |

=== 4th District ===
Lucy Torres-Gomez is the incumbent.

Philippine House of Representatives election at Leyte's 4th district
| Party | Candidate | Votes | % |
|---|---|---|---|
| Liberal | Lucy Marie Gomez | 137,601 | 62.50% |
| Aksyon | Violy Codilla | 82,557 | 37.50% |
| Valid ballots | | 220,158 | 89.86% |
| Margin of victory | | 55,044 | 25.00% |
| Invalid or blank votes | | 24,846 | 10.14% |
| Total votes | | 245,004 | 100.00% |
| Liberal hold | | | |

=== 5th District ===
Jose Carlos Cari is the incumbent.

Philippine House of Representatives election at Leyte's 5th district
| Party | Candidate | Votes | % |
|---|---|---|---|
| Liberal | Jose Carlos Cari | 134,955 | 91.81% |
| UNA | Gongie Galenzoga | 12,033 | 8.19% |
| Valid ballots | | 146,988 | 76.30% |
| Margin of victory | | 122,922 | 83.63% |
| Invalid or blank votes | | 45,646 | 23.70% |
| Total votes | | 192,634 | 100.00% |
| Liberal hold | | | |

== Northern Samar ==
Each of Northern Samar's 2 legislative districts will elect each representative to the House of Representatives. The candidate with the highest number of votes wins the seat.

=== 1st District ===
Harlin Abayon is the incumbent.

Philippine House of Representatives election at Northern Samar's 1st district
| Party | Candidate | Votes | % |
|---|---|---|---|
| Liberal | Raul Daza | 80,157 | 50.01% |
| Nacionalista | Harlin Abayon | 80,110 | 49.99% |
| Valid ballots | | 160,267 | 88.59% |
| Margin of victory | | 47 | 0.01% |
| Invalid or blank votes | | 20,521 | 11.35% |
| Total votes | | 180,788 | 100.00% |
| Liberal gain from Nacionalista | | | |

=== 2nd District ===
Emil L. Ong was the incumbent but ineligible for reelection. His party nominated his son, Edwin Ongchuan, running unopposed.

Philippine House of Representatives election at Northern Samar's 2nd district
| Party | Candidate | Votes | % |
|---|---|---|---|
| NUP | Edwin Ong Ongchuan | 67,653 | 100.00% |
| Valid ballots | | 67,653 | 47.23% |
| Invalid or blank votes | | 75,581 | 52.77% |
| Total votes | | 143,234 | 100.00% |
| NUP hold | | | |

== Samar ==
Each of Samar's 2 legislative districts will elect each representative to the House of Representatives. The candidate with the highest number of votes wins the seat.

=== 1st District ===
Mel Senen Sarmiento is the incumbent but not seeking for reelection. He was appointed as secretary of DILG on September 11, 2015.

Philippine House of Representatives election at Samar's 1st district
| Party | Candidate | Votes | % |
|---|---|---|---|
| Liberal | Edgar Sarmiento | 86,115 | 51.86% |
| Nacionalista | Monmon Uy | 77,548 | 46.70% |
| Independent | Irma Sarmiento | 2,401 | 1.45% |
| Valid ballots | | 166,064 | 89.33% |
| Margin of victory | | 8,567 | 5.16% |
| Invalid or blank votes | | 19,843 | 10.67% |
| Total votes | | 185,907 | 100.00% |
| Liberal hold | | | |

=== 2nd District ===
Milagrosa Tan is the incumbent

Philippine House of Representatives election at Samar's 2nd district
| Party | Candidate | Votes | % |
|---|---|---|---|
| NPC | Milagrosa Tan | 137,248 | 69.16% |
| Liberal | Myrna Ojeda-Tan | 61,189 | 30.84% |
| Valid ballots | | 198,437 | 83.84% |
| Margin of victory | | 76,059 | 38.33% |
| Invalid or blank votes | | 38,262 | 16.16% |
| Total votes | | 236,699 | 100.00% |
| NPC hold | | | |

== Southern Leyte ==
Damian Mercado is the incumbent but he is again running for governor. His brother, former Rep. Roger Mercado was nominated by his party.

Philippine House of Representatives election at Southern Leyte
| Party | Candidate | Votes | % |
|---|---|---|---|
| Liberal | Oging Mercado | 123,806 | 65.23% |
| UNA | Rico Rentuza | 65,998 | 34.77% |
| Valid ballots | | 189,804 | 84.38% |
| Margin of victory | | 57,808 | 30.46% |
| Invalid or blank votes | | 35,132 | 15.62% |
| Total votes | | 224,936 | 100.00% |
| Liberal hold | | | |
