= 2016 Philippine House of Representatives elections in the Bicol Region =

Elections were held in Bicol Region for seats in the House of Representatives of the Philippines on May 9, 2016.

== Summary ==
Party	Popular vote	%	Swing	Seats won	Change
Liberal	1,097,759			9	▲3
NPC	614,611			4	▲1
Nacionalista	225,069			2	▲1
NUP	94,513			1	▼1
UNA	74,479			0	
PDP–Laban	63,356			0	
Independent	36,770			0	
LM	1,138			0	
Lakas	0			0	▼4
Valid votes	2,207,695			16	
Invalid votes	436,484				
Turnout	2,644,179				
Registered voters					

== Albay ==
Each of Albay's three legislative districts will elect each representative to the House of Representatives. The candidate with the highest number of votes wins the seat.

=== 1st District ===
Edcel B. Lagman Jr. is the incumbent but not seeking for reelection. His party nominated his father and former congressman Edcel Lagman.

2016 Philippine House of Representatives election at Albay's 1st District
Party	Candidate	Votes	%
Liberal	Edcel Lagman	102,939	
NPC	Antonio Betito	52,555	
PDP–Laban	Gregorio Luis Contacto	16,316	
Invalid or blank votes		17,807	
Total votes		189,617	
Liberal hold			

=== 2nd District ===
Al Francis C. Bichara is the incumbent but ineligible for reelection due to term limit. He seeking for governorship instead.

2016 Philippine House of Representatives election at Albay's 2nd District
Party	Candidate	Votes	%
Liberal	Joey Salceda	171,339	
Independent	Jose Maria Los Baños	5,518	
Independent	Danilo Maravillas	3,869	
Independent	Josue Joshua Martinez Jr.	3,546	
Independent	Virgilio Goyena	2,051	
Invalid or blank votes		32,611	
Total votes		218,934	
Liberal gain from Nacionalista			

=== 3rd District ===
Fernando Gonzales is the incumbent.

2016 Philippine House of Representatives election at Albay's 3rd District
Party	Candidate	Votes	%
Liberal	Fernando Gonzales	174,554	
Independent	Oliver Olaybal	10,134	
Independent	Elmer Felix Pornel	2,803	
Invalid or blank votes		40,554	
Total votes		228,045	
Liberal hold			

== Camarines Norte ==
Each of Camarines Norte's two legislative districts will elect each representative to the House of Representatives. The candidate with the highest number of votes wins the seat.

=== 1st District ===
Catherine Barcelona-Reyes is the incumbent but not seeking for reelection. She is vying for governor instead.

2016 Philippine House of Representatives election at Camarines Norte's 1st District
Party	Candidate	Votes	%
Liberal	Renato Unico	56,143	
NPC	Josefina Tallado	53,620	
Invalid or blank votes		15,058	
Total votes		124,821	
Liberal hold			

=== 2nd District ===
Elmer E. Panotes is the incumbent but died on September 16, 2015. His wife, Marisol is the party's nominee.

2016 Philippine House of Representatives election at Camarines Norte's 2nd District
Party	Candidate	Votes	%
Liberal	Marisol Panotes	54,406	
NPC	Liwayway Chato	45,414	
Nacionalista	Senen Jerez	12,695	
Independent	Donald Asis	2,019	
Independent	Reynante Napao	360	
Independent	Romeo Balmeo	230	
Invalid or blank votes		14,615	
Total votes		129,739	
Liberal gain from Lakas			

== Camarines Sur ==
Each of Camarines Sur's five legislative districts will elect each representative to the House of Representatives. The candidate with the highest number of votes wins the seat.

=== 1st District ===
Rolando Andaya, Jr. is the incumbent.

2016 Philippine House of Representatives election at Camarines Sur's 1st District
Party	Candidate	Votes	%
NPC	Rolando Andaya, Jr.	55,526	
Liberal	Apolinar Rull Napoles	22,185	
Nacionalista	Nestor de los Reyes	830	
Invalid or blank votes		10,978	
Total votes		89,519	
NPC hold			

=== 2nd District ===
Diosdado Ignacio M. Arroyo is term limited, his party nominate Asuncion Arceño, which run against Former Governor LRay Villafuerte.

2016 Philippine House of Representatives election at Camarines Sur's 2nd District
Party	Candidate	Votes	%
Nacionalista	Luis Raymund Villafuerte Jr.	88,693	
NPC	Asuncion Arceño	37,029	
Invalid or blank votes		21,699	
Total votes		147,421	
Nacionalista gain from Lakas			

=== 3rd District ===
Neophyte congresswoman Leni Robredo is the incumbent but not seeking for reelection. She is vying for vice-president of the country instead.

2016 Philippine House of Representatives election at Camarines Sur's 3rd District
Party	Candidate	Votes	%
Liberal	Gabriel Bordado	100,127	
NPC	Luis Villafuerte	81,074	
Invalid or blank votes		28,463	
Total votes		209,664	
Liberal hold			

=== 4th District ===
Felix William Fuentebella is the incumbent but not seeking for reelection. His party nominated his father and former congressman Arnulfo Fuentebella.

2016 Philippine House of Representatives election at Camarines Sur's 4th District
Party	Candidate	Votes	%
NPC	Arnulfo Fuentebella	83,969	
Liberal	Imelda Papin	83,229	
LM	William Iliw-iliw	1,138	
Invalid or blank votes		24,742	
Total votes		193,078	
NPC hold			

=== 5th District ===
Salvio B. Fortuno is the incumbent.

2016 Philippine House of Representatives election at Camarines Sur's 5th District
Party	Candidate	Votes	%
Liberal	Salvio Fortuno	134,372	
UNA	Felix Alfelor Jr.	36,680	
Invalid or blank votes		30,762	
Total votes		201,814	
Liberal hold			

== Catanduanes ==
Cesar V. Sarmiento is the incumbent.

2016 Philippine House of Representatives election at Catanduanes' Lone District
Party	Candidate	Votes	%
Liberal	Cesar Sarmiento	86,857	
UNA	Hector Sanchez	37,799	
Independent	Leandro Verceles Jr.	6,240	
Invalid or blank votes		21,609	
Total votes		152,505	
Liberal hold			

== Masbate ==
Each of Masbate's three legislative districts will elect each representative to the House of Representatives. The candidate with the highest number of votes wins the seat

=== 1st District ===
Ma. Vida V. Espinosa-Bravo is the incumbent.

2016 Philippine House of Representatives election at Masbate's 1st District
Party	Candidate	Votes	%
NUP	Ma. Vida Espinosa-Bravo	46,026	
Nacionalista	Ciceron Altarejos	12,947	
Invalid or blank votes		20,279	
Total votes		79,252	
NUP hold			

=== 2nd District ===
Elisa T. Kho is the incumbent.

2016 Philippine House of Representatives election at Masbate's 2nd District
Party	Candidate	Votes	%
Nacionalista	Elisa Kho	61,182	
NUP	Vincente Homer Revil	48,487	
NPC	Darius Tuason	25,671	
Invalid or blank votes		35,142	
Total votes		170,482	
Nacionalista hold			

=== 3rd District ===
Scott Davies S. Lanete is the incumbent.

2016 Philippine House of Representatives election at Masbate's 3rd District
Party	Candidate	Votes	%
NPC	Scott Davies Lanete	63,684	
Nacionalista	Wilton Kho	48,722	
Invalid or blank votes		32,902	
Total votes		145,308	
NPC hold			

== Sorsogon ==
Each of Sorsogon's two legislative districts will elect each representative to the House of Representatives. The candidate with the highest number of votes wins the seat.

=== 1st District ===
Evelina G. Escudero is the incumbent and running unopposed.

2016 Philippine House of Representatives election at Sorsogon's 1st District
Party	Candidate	Votes	%
NPC	Evelina Escudero	116,069	
Invalid or blank votes		64,305	
Total votes		180,374	
NPC hold			

=== 2nd District ===
Deogracias B. Ramos Jr. is the incumbent.

2016 Philippine House of Representatives election at Sorsogon's 2nd District
Party	Candidate	Votes	%
Liberal	Deogracias Ramos Jr.	111,608	
PDP–Laban	Eduardo Ong Jr.	47,040	
Invalid or blank votes		24,958	
Total votes		183,606	
Liberal hold			
