= 2016 Philippine House of Representatives elections in the Ilocos Region =

Elections were held in Ilocos Region for seats in the House of Representatives of the Philippines on May 9, 2016.

The candidate with the most votes won that district's seat for the 17th Congress of the Philippines.

== Summary ==
Party	Popular vote	%	Swing	Seats won	Change
Liberal	970,464			6	▲4
NPC	573,411			3	▼3
Nacionalista	217,775			2	Steady
Aksyon	133,381			1	▲1
Independent	120,960			0	
KBL	60,197			0	▼1
NUP	40,201			0	
PDP–Laban	24,263			0	
UNA	1,712			0	
Lakas	0			0	▼1
Valid votes	2,142,364			12	
Invalid votes	382,994				
Turnout	2,525,358				
Registered voters					

== Ilocos Norte ==
=== 1st District ===
Incumbent Rodolfo Fariñas is running

2016 Philippine House of Representatives election at Ilocos Norte's 1st district
Party	Candidate	Votes	%
Liberal	Rodolfo Fariñas	138,196	
KBL	Ryan Remigio	3,213	
UNA	Ruel Mandac	1,712	
Invalid or blank votes		24,004	
Total votes		167,125	
Liberal hold			

=== 2nd District ===
Imelda Marcos is the incumbent. She changed her party affiliation from KBL to Nacionalista.

2016 Philippine House of Representatives election at Ilocos Norte's 2nd district
Party	Candidate	Votes	%
Nacionalista	Imelda Marcos	134,725	
Independent	Lorenzo Madamba	2,095	
Margin of victory			
Invalid or blank votes		19,193	
Total votes		156,013	
Nacionalista hold			

== Ilocos Sur ==
=== 1st District ===
Incumbent Ronald Singson is not running. His party nominated incumbent Vice Governor Deogracias Victor Savellano.

2016 Philippine House of Representatives election at Ilocos Sur's 1st district
Party	Candidate	Votes	%
Nacionalista	Deogracias Victor Savellano	83,050	
Independent	Basi Purisima	55,193	
Margin of victory			
Invalid or blank votes		11,711	
Total votes		149,954	
Nacionalista hold			

=== 2nd District ===
Eric Singson is the incumbent.

2016 Philippine House of Representatives election at Ilocos Sur's 2nd district
Party	Candidate	Votes	%
Liberal	Eric Singson	158,626	
Independent	Henry Capela	9,478	
PDP–Laban	Med Balicdang	1,859	
Margin of victory			
Invalid or blank votes		37,881	
Total votes		207,844	
Liberal hold			

== La Union ==
=== 1st District ===
Incumbent Victor Francisco Ortega is term limited and is running for Mayor of San Fernando City.

2016 Philippine House of Representatives election at La Union's 1st district
Party	Candidate	Votes	%
Liberal	Pablo Ortega	117,845	
Independent	Manuel Victor Ortega, Jr.	26,633	
Independent	Justo Oros III	12,017	
Margin of victory			
Invalid or blank votes		25,345	
Total votes		181,840	
Liberal gain from Lakas			

=== 2nd District ===
Eufranio Eriguel is not running.

2016 Philippine House of Representatives election at La Union's 2nd district
Party	Candidate	Votes	%
NPC	Sandra Eriguel	150,020	
NUP	Thomas Dumpit	40,201	
Margin of victory			
Invalid or blank votes		20,937	
Total votes		211,158	
NPC hold			

== Pangasinan ==
=== 1st District ===
Jesus Celeste is the incumbent.

2016 Philippine House of Representatives election at Pangasinan's 1st district
Party	Candidate	Votes	%
NPC	Jesus Celeste	147,273	
Liberal	Wilmer Panabang	18,799	
KBL	Paul Tucay	3,140	
Margin of victory			
Invalid or blank votes		34,468	
Total votes		203,680	
NPC hold			

=== 2nd District ===
Leopoldo Bataoil is the incumbent. He changed his party affiliation from NPC to Liberal.

2016 Philippine House of Representatives election at Pangasinan's 2nd district
Party	Candidate	Votes	%
Liberal	Leopoldo Bataoil	172,078	
Invalid or blank votes		73,882	
Total votes		245,960	
Liberal hold			

=== 3rd District ===
2016 Philippine House of Representatives election at Pangasinan's 3rd district
Party	Candidate	Votes	%
Liberal	Rosemarie Arenas	192,831	
KBL	Paul Tucay	53,844	
PDP–Laban	Med Balicdang	22,404	
Invalid or blank votes		31,183	
Total votes		300,262	
Liberal hold			

=== 4th District ===
Incumbent Gina de Venecia is not running.

2016 Philippine House of Representatives election at Pangasinan's 4th district
Party	Candidate	Votes	%
Liberal	Christopher De Venecia	172,089	
Independent	Angel Aquino	6,525	
Independent	Arvin De Guzman	4,829	
Independent	Mario Operaña	2,293	
Independent	Ronaldo Ebreo	1,897	
Margin of victory			
Invalid or blank votes		42,978	
Total votes		230,611	
Liberal gain from NPC			

=== 5th District ===
Carmen Cojuangco is the incumbent.

2016 Philippine House of Representatives election at Pangasinan's 5th district
Party	Candidate	Votes	%
Aksyon	Amado Espino, Jr.	133,381	
NPC	Carmen Cojuangco	92,943	
Margin of victory			
Invalid or blank votes		15,769	
Total votes		242,093	
Aksyon gain from NPC			

=== 6th District ===
Incumbent Marlyn Primicias-Agabas is running unopposed.

2016 Philippine House of Representatives election at Pangasinan's 6th district
Party	Candidate	Votes	%
NPC	Marlyn Primicias-Agabas	183,175	
Invalid or blank votes		45,643	
Total votes		228,818	
NPC hold			
