= 2016 Philippine House of Representatives elections in Caraga =

Elections were held in Caraga for seats in the House of Representatives of the Philippines on May 9, 2016.

== Summary ==
Party	Popular vote	%	Swing	Seats won	Change
Aksyon					
Lakas					
Liberal					
Nacionalista					
NUP					
PDP–Laban					
UNA					
Independent					
Valid votes					
Invalid votes					
Turnout					
Registered voters					

== Agusan del Norte ==
Each of Agusan del Norte's two legislative districts will elect each representative to the House of Representatives. The candidate with the highest number of votes wins the seat.

=== 1st District ===
Lawrence Lemuel H. Fortun is the incumbent

2016 Philippine House of Representatives election at Agusan del Norte's 1st District
Party	Candidate	Votes	%
Liberal	Lawrence Lemuel Fortun		
Aksyon	Roan Libarios		
Total votes			

=== 2nd District ===
Erlpe John M. Amante is the incumbent.

2016 Philippine House of Representatives election at Agusan del Norte's 2nd District
Party	Candidate	Votes	%
Nacionalista	Erlpe John Amante		
Liberal	Dale Corvera		
Total votes			

== Agusan del Sur ==
Each of Agusan del Sur's two legislative districts will elect each representative to the House of Representatives. The candidate with the highest number of votes wins the seat.

=== 1st District ===
Ma. Valentina Plaza-Cornelio is the incumbent and running unopposed.

2016 Philippine House of Representatives election at Agusan del Sur's 1st District
Party	Candidate	Votes	%
NUP	Ma. Valentina Plaza-Cornelio		
Total votes			
NUP hold			

=== 2nd District ===
Evelyn G. Plaza-Mellana is the incumbent and also running unopposed.

2016 Philippine House of Representatives election at Agusan del Sur's 2nd District
Party	Candidate	Votes	%
NUP	Evelyn Plaza-Mellana		
Total votes			
NUP hold			

== Dinagat Islands ==
Arlene J. Bag-ao is the incumbent.

2016 Philippine House of Representatives election at Dinagat Islands' Lone District
Party	Candidate	Votes	%
Liberal	Arlene Bag-ao		
UNA	Geraldine Ecleo		
Total votes			

== Surigao del Norte ==
Each of Surigao del Norte's two legislative districts will elect each representative to the House of Representatives. The candidate with the highest number of votes wins the seat.

=== 1st District ===
Francisco T. Matugas is the incumbent but ineligible for reelection. His party nominated his eldest son, Francisco Jose Matugas. Constantino Navarro III, son of former Surigao City mayor Constantino Navarro Jr. challenged him the seat.

2016 Philippine House of Representatives election at Surigao del Norte's 1st District
Party	Candidate	Votes	%
Liberal	Francisco Jose Matugas		
Nacionalista	Constantino Navarro III		
UNA	Lane Pangilinan		
Total votes			

=== 2nd District ===
Guillermo A. Romarate Jr. is the incumbent but ineligible for reelection. He is running for governor instead. Former congressman Robert Ace Barbers is running against climate change lawyer Mary Ann Lucille L. Sering.

2016 Philippine House of Representatives election at Surigao del Norte's 2nd District
Party	Candidate	Votes	%
Nacionalista	Robert Ace Barbers		
Liberal	Mary Ann Lucille Sering		
Total votes			

== Surigao del Sur ==
Each of Surigao del Sur's two legislative districts will elect each representative to the House of Representatives. The candidate with the highest number of votes wins the seat

=== 1st District ===
Neophyte congresswoman Mary Elizabeth Ty-Delgado is the incumbent but not seeking for reelection. Former congressman, Prospero Pichay Jr. is running to regain his seat.

2016 Philippine House of Representatives election at Surigao del Sur's 1st District
Party	Candidate	Votes	%
PDP–Laban	Gregorio Murillo Jr.		
Lakas	Prospero Pichay Jr.		
Total votes			

=== 2nd District ===
Florencio C. Garay is the incumbent but ineligible for reelection. He is running for governor instead. Incumbent governor Johnny T. Pimentel was challenged by incumbent provincial board member, Conrad C. Cejoco.

2016 Philippine House of Representatives election at Surigao del Sur's 2nd District
Party	Candidate	Votes	%
UNA	Conrad Cejoco		
Liberal	Johnny Pimentel		
Total votes			
