= 2016 Philippine House of Representatives elections in the Cordillera Administrative Region =

Elections were held in Cordillera Administrative Region for seats in the House of Representatives of the Philippines on May 9, 2016.

== Summary ==
| Party | Popular vote | % | Swing | Seats won | Change |
|---|---|---|---|---|---|
| Liberal | 359,405 | 47.55% | | 5 | Steady |
| NPC | 104,479 | 13.82% | | 1 | Steady |
| Nacionalista | 99,501 | 13.16% | | 1 | ▲1 |
| NUP | 78,822 | 10.43% | | 0 | |
| Independent | 51,640 | 6.83% | | 0 | ▼1 |
| Lakas | 3,424 | 0.45% | | 0 | |
| Valid votes | 697,271 | 92.26% | | 7 | |
| Invalid votes | 58,501 | 7.74% | | | |
| Turnout | 755,772 | 100% | | | |
| Registered voters | | | | | |

== Abra ==
Ma. Jocelyn V. Bernos is the incumbent but she is not seeking for reelection. She is running for governor instead.

2016 Philippine House of Representatives election at Abra's Lone District
| Party | Candidate | Votes | % |
|---|---|---|---|
| Liberal | Joseph Bernos | 63,919 | |
| Nacionalista | Marco Bautista | 53,814 | |
| Independent | Joselito Bringas | 7,460 | |
| Lakas | Cecilia Luna | 3,424 | |
| Invalid or blank votes | | 11,307 | |
| Total votes | | 139,924 | |
| Liberal hold | | | |

== Apayao ==
Eleanor C. Bulut-Begtang is the incumbent and running unopposed.

2016 Philippine House of Representatives election at Apayao's Lone District
| Party | Candidate | Votes | % |
|---|---|---|---|
| NPC | Eleanor Bulut-Begtang | 41,654 | |
| Invalid or blank votes | | 11,378 | |
| Total votes | | 53,032 | |
| NPC hold | | | |

== Baguio ==
Nicasio M. Aliping Jr. is the incumbent.

2016 Philippine House of Representatives election at Baguio's Lone District
| Party | Candidate | Votes | % |
|---|---|---|---|
| Nacionalista | Mark Go | 45,687 | |
| Liberal | Nicasio Aliping Jr. | 40,766 | |
| NPC | Bernardo Vergara | 20,649 | |
| Independent | Rudy Aspilan | 2,957 | |
| Independent | Edgardo Duque | 648 | |
| Invalid or blank votes | | 5,222 | |
| Total votes | | 115,929 | |
| Nacionalista gain from Liberal | | | |

== Benguet ==
Ronald M. Cosalan is the incumbent.

2016 Philippine House of Representatives election at Benguet's Lone District
| Party | Candidate | Votes | % |
|---|---|---|---|
| Liberal | Ronald Cosalan | 87,445 | |
| NUP | Nestor Fongwan | 78,822 | |
| Invalid or blank votes | | 5,633 | |
| Total votes | | 171,900 | |
| Liberal hold | | | |

== Ifugao ==
Teodoro B. Baguilat, Jr. is the incumbent.

2016 Philippine House of Representatives election at Ifugao's Lone District
| Party | Candidate | Votes | % |
|---|---|---|---|
| Liberal | Teodoro Baguilat Jr. | 49,640 | |
| Independent | Solomon Chungalao | 39,847 | |
| Invalid or blank votes | | 3,946 | |
| Total votes | | 93,433 | |
| Liberal hold | | | |

== Kalinga ==
Incumbent Manuel S. Agyao is ineligible for reelection.

2016 Philippine House of Representatives election at Kalinga's Lone District
| Party | Candidate | Votes | % |
|---|---|---|---|
| Liberal | Allen Jesse Mangaoang | 54,006 | |
| NPC | Camilo Lammawin | 42,176 | |
| Independent | Carlos Duyan | 728 | |
| Invalid or blank votes | | 6,581 | |
| Total votes | | 103,491 | |
| Liberal hold | | | |

== Mountain Province ==
Maximo B. Dalog is the incumbent and unopposed.

2016 Philippine House of Representatives election at Mountain Province's Lone District
| Party | Candidate | Votes | % |
|---|---|---|---|
| Liberal | Maximo Dalog | 63,629 | |
| Invalid or blank votes | | 14,434 | |
| Total votes | | 78,063 | |
| Liberal hold | | | |
