= 2016 Philippine House of Representatives elections in the Autonomous Region in Muslim Mindanao =

Elections were held in Autonomous Region in Muslim Mindanao for seats in the House of Representatives of the Philippines on May 9, 2016.

== Summary ==
Party	Popular vote	%	Swing	Seats won	Change
Liberal					
Nacionalista					
NPC					
NUP					
PDP–Laban					
PBM					
UNA					
Independent					
Valid votes					
Invalid votes					
Turnout					
Registered voters					

== Basilan ==
Hadjiman S. Hataman-Salliman is the incumbent but seeking for reelection. He is running for governor instead.

2016 Philippine House of Representatives election at Basilan's Lone District
Party	Candidate	Votes	%
Liberal	Jum Jainudin Akbar		
NPC	Sander Antig		
Independent	Al-Rasheed Sakkalahul		
Nacionalista	Abdulgani Salapuddin		
Total votes			

== Lanao del Sur ==
Each of Lanao del Sur's two legislative districts will elect each representative to the House of Representatives. The candidate with the highest number of votes wins the seat.

=== 1st District ===
Ansarrudin Abdulmalik Alonto-Adiong is the incumbent.

2016 Philippine House of Representatives election at Lanao del Sur's 1st District
Party	Candidate	Votes	%
Liberal	Ansarrudin Abdulmalik Alonto-Adiong		
UNA	Faysah Dumarpa		
PBM	Calawanan Otara		
Independent	Mar Paiso		
Total votes			

=== 2nd District ===
Pangalian M. Balindong is the incumbent but ineligible for reelection. He is running for governor instead.

2016 Philippine House of Representatives election at Lanao del Sur's 2nd District
Party	Candidate	Votes	%
PBM	Rommel Alonto		
Liberal	Yasser Balindong		
NPC	Mohammad Hafez Marohom		
PDP–Laban	Mauyag Balt Papandayan Jr.		
Total votes			

== Maguindanao ==
Each of Maguindanao's two legislative districts will elect each representative to the House of Representatives. The candidate with the highest number of votes wins the seat.

=== 1st District ===
Bai Sandra A. Sema is the incumbent.

2016 Philippine House of Representatives election at Maguindanao's 1st District
Party	Candidate	Votes	%
Independent	Bufford Beto		
UNA	Tucao Mastura		
Independent	H'Je Palacala		
Liberal	Bai Sandra Sema		
Total votes			

=== 2nd District ===
Zajid G. Mangudadatu is the incumbent.

2016 Philippine House of Representatives election at Maguindanao's 2nd District
Party	Candidate	Votes	%
NPC	Lowell Macbangen		
Independent	Roger Mamalo		
Liberal	Zajid Mangudadatu		
PBM	Pendatun Pangadil		
Total votes			

== Sulu ==
Each of Sulu's two legislative districts will elect each representative to the House of Representatives. The candidate with the highest number of votes wins the seat.

=== 1st District ===
Tupay T. Loong is the incumbent.

2016 Philippine House of Representatives election at Sulu's 1st District
Party	Candidate	Votes	%
PDP–Laban	Saripuddin Jikiri		
NUP	Tupay Loong		
Total votes			

=== 2nd District ===
Neophyte congresswoman Maryam N. Arbison is the incumbent but not seeking reelection. Her party nominated her husband and former congressman Abdulmunir Arbison.

2016 Philippine House of Representatives election at Sulu's 2nd District
Party	Candidate	Votes	%
Liberal	Abdulmunir Arbison		
PDP–Laban	Nur-Ana Sahidulla		
Total votes			

== Tawi-Tawi ==
Ruby M. Sahali-Tan is the incumbent.

2016 Philippine House of Representatives election at Tawi-Tawi's Lone District
Party	Candidate	Votes	%
NUP	Myrna Ajihil		
Liberal	Ruby Sahali-Tan		
Total votes			
