= 2025 Philippine local elections in the Cordillera Administrative Region =

- May 12, 2025
- Gubernatorial elections
- 6 provincial governors and 1 city mayor
Party	Seats	+/–
Lakas	3	+1
NPC	2	0
PFP	2	+2
This lists parties that won seats. See the complete results below.
- Vice gubernatorial elections
- 6 provincial vice governors and 1 city vice mayor
Party	Seats	+/–
PFP	3	New
Lakas	2	New
PDP–Laban	1	0
Independent	1	0
This lists parties that won seats. See the complete results below.
- Provincial Board elections
- 60 provincial board members and 12 city councilors
Party	Seats	+/–
Lakas	22	+21
PFP	16	+15
NPC	9	+5
Nacionalista	8	+2
Asenso Abrenio	2	−6
Liberal	2	−4
Aksyon	1	0
LDP	1	0
UBP	1	−6
Independent	10	−1
This lists parties that won seats. See the complete results below.

The 2025 Philippine local elections in the Cordillera Administrative Region were held on May 12, 2025.

== Summary ==
=== Governors ===
Province/city	Incumbent	Incumbent's party	Winner	Winner's party	Winning margin
Abra	Dominic Valera	Asenso Abrenio	Takit Bersamin	PFP	58.60%
Apayao	Elias Bulut Jr.	NPC	Elias Bulut Jr.	NPC	Unopposed
Baguio (HUC)	Benjamin Magalong	NPC	Benjamin Magalong	NPC	9.07%
Benguet	Melchor Diclas	Lakas	Melchor Diclas	Lakas	40.31%
Ifugao	Jerry Dalipog	Lakas	Jerry Dalipog	Lakas	43.45%
Kalinga	James Edduba	Lakas	James Edduba	Lakas	10.46%
Mountain Province	Bonifacio Lacwasan	PFP	Bonifacio Lacwasan	PFP	4.08%

=== Vice governors ===
Province/city	Incumbent	Incumbent's party	Winner	Winner's party	Winning margin
Abra	Joy Bernos	Asenso Abrenio	Anne Bersamin	PFP	56.72%
Apayao	Remy Albano	KBL	Kyle Bulut	Lakas	Unopposed
Baguio (HUC)	Faustino Olowan	PFP	Faustino Olowan	PFP	41.90%
Benguet	Tagel Felipe	PFP	Marie Rose Fongwan-Kepes	Lakas	32.16%
Ifugao	Glenn Prudenciano	Lakas	Omar Habawel	PDP–Laban	22.08%
Kalinga	Jocel Baac	PFP	Dave Odiem	PFP	6.56%
Mountain Province	Francis Tauli	PFP	Jet Dominguez	Independent	9.73%

=== Provincial boards ===
Province/city	Seats	Party control		Composition
Province/city	Seats	Previous	Result	Composition
Abra	10 elected 4 ex-officio	Asenso Abrenio	No majority	PFP (7); Asenso Abrenio (2); NPC (1)
Apayao	10 elected 4 ex-officio	No majority	No majority	Lakas (5); NPC (5)
Baguio (HUC)	12 elected 3 ex-officio	No majority	No majority	Lakas (4); Liberal (1); Nacionalista (1); NPC (1); PFP (1); Independent (4)
Benguet	10 elected 4 ex-officio	No majority	Lakas	Lakas (8); PFP (1); UBP (1)
Ifugao	10 elected 3 ex-officio	No majority	No majority	Lakas (5); PFP (2); NPC (1); Independent (2)
Kalinga	10 elected 4 ex-officio	No majority	No majority	Nacionalista (4); Aksyon (1); Liberal (1); NPC (1); PFP (1); Independent (2)
Mountain Province	10 elected 4 ex-officio	No majority	No majority	PFP (4); Nacionalista (3); LDP (1); Independent (2)

== Abra ==
=== Governor ===
Incumbent Governor Dominic Valera of Asenso Abrenio ran for mayor of Bangued.

Elected in 2022, Valera has been suspended by the Office of the President since December 9, 2024, for abuse of power in appointing a Bucay councilor.

Asenso Abrenio nominated Valera's grandson, Bangued vice mayor Kiko Bernos, who was defeated by former Abra governor Takit Bersamin of the Partido Federal ng Pilipinas.

Candidate	Party	Votes	%
Takit Bersamin	Partido Federal ng Pilipinas	133,176	79.30
Kiko Bernos	Asenso Abrenio	34,755	20.70
Total		167,931	100.00
Valid votes		167,931	97.09
Invalid/blank votes		5,028	2.91
Total votes		172,959	100.00
Registered voters/turnout		188,957	91.53
PFP gain from Asenso Abrenio			
Source: Commission on Elections

=== Vice Governor ===
Incumbent Vice Governor Joy Bernos of Asenso Abrenio ran for a full term.

Elected in 2022, Bernos has been suspended by the Office of the President since August 12, 2024, for ordering the lockdown of a Bangued hospital during COVID-19 pandemic in 2020, when she was still governor, and for abuse of power in appointing a Bucay councilor.

Bernos was defeated by Anne Bersamin of the Partido Federal ng Pilipinas.

Candidate	Party	Votes	%
Anne Bersamin	Partido Federal ng Pilipinas	130,127	78.36
Joy Bernos (incumbent)	Asenso Abrenio	35,932	21.64
Total		166,059	100.00
Valid votes		166,059	96.01
Invalid/blank votes		6,900	3.99
Total votes		172,959	100.00
Registered voters/turnout		188,957	91.53
PFP gain from Asenso Abrenio			
Source: Commission on Elections

=== Provincial Board ===
Since Abra's reclassification as a 1st class province in 2025, the Abra Provincial Board is composed of 14 board members, 10 of whom are elected.

The Partido Federal ng Pilipinas won seven seats, becoming the largest party in the provincial board.

Party	Votes	%	Seats	+/–
Partido Federal ng Pilipinas	333,319	60.30	7	New
Asenso Abrenio	113,108	20.46	2	–6
Nationalist People's Coalition	67,066	12.13	1	New
Nacionalista Party	23,462	4.24	0	New
Independent	15,820	2.86	0	New
Total	552,775	100.00	10	+2
Total votes	172,959	–		
Registered voters/turnout	188,957	91.53		
Source: Commission on Elections

==== 1st district ====
Abra's 1st provincial district consists of the municipalities of Boliney, Bucay, Bucloc, Daguioman, Langiden, Luba, Manabo, Peñarrubia, Pidigan, Pilar, Sallapadan, San Isidro, San Quintin, Tubo and Villaviciosa. Four board members are elected from this provincial district.

14 candidates were included in the ballot.

Candidate	Party	Votes	%
Jane Cecilia	Partido Federal ng Pilipinas	47,217	21.57
Rodolfo de la Paz (incumbent)	Partido Federal ng Pilipinas	32,051	14.64
Ruy Bernardez	Partido Federal ng Pilipinas	29,954	13.68
Glannie Domingo	Partido Federal ng Pilipinas	28,803	13.16
Julius Balao-as	Nacionalista Party	23,462	10.72
Antonio Dayag	Asenso Abrenio	12,324	5.63
Quintin Beroña	Asenso Abrenio	9,183	4.19
Romeo Advincula	Asenso Abrenio	7,465	3.41
Noli Alzate	Independent	6,658	3.04
Elmer Bides	Nationalist People's Coalition	6,356	2.90
Gilman Barcarse	Asenso Abrenio	6,274	2.87
Jen Luna	Independent	4,401	2.01
Jessie Dioayan	Independent	3,390	1.55
Robert Segundo	Independent	1,371	0.63
Total		218,909	100.00
Total votes		75,358	–
Registered voters/turnout		81,774	92.15
Source: Commission on Elections

==== 2nd district ====
Abra's 2nd provincial district consists of the municipalities of Bangued, Danglas, Dolores, La Paz, Lacub, Lagangilang, Lagayan, Licuan-Baay, Malibcong, San Juan, Tayum and Tineg. Six board members are elected from this provincial district.

Eight candidates were included in the ballot.

Candidate	Party	Votes	%
Pat Abaya (incumbent)	Partido Federal ng Pilipinas	66,503	19.92
Byrone Alzate	Partido Federal ng Pilipinas	64,867	19.43
Mark Froilan Seares	Partido Federal ng Pilipinas	63,924	19.15
Luis Jorobots Bersamin IV	Nationalist People's Coalition	60,710	18.18
Panchet Bringas	Asenso Abrenio	29,543	8.85
Ivan Benwaren	Asenso Abrenio	18,303	5.48
Dannah Rose Gonzales	Asenso Abrenio	15,654	4.69
Cynlai Osorio	Asenso Abrenio	14,362	4.30
Total		333,866	100.00
Total votes		97,601	–
Registered voters/turnout		107,183	91.06
Source: Commission on Elections

== Apayao ==
=== Governor ===
Incumbent Governor Elias Bulut Jr. of the Nationalist People's Coalition won re-election for a second term unopposed.

Domingo Purieng (Independent) initially ran as a candidate. However, on December 12, 2024, the Commission on Election's First Division declared Purieng as a nuisance candidate.

Candidate	Party	Votes	%
Elias Bulut Jr. (incumbent)	Nationalist People's Coalition	58,175	100.00
Total		58,175	100.00
Valid votes		58,175	80.19
Invalid/blank votes		14,373	19.81
Total votes		72,548	100.00
Registered voters/turnout		83,441	86.95
NPC hold			
Source: Commission on Elections

=== Vice Governor ===
Term-limited incumbent Vice Governor Remy Albano (Kilusang Bagong Lipunan) ran for the House of Representatives as a nominee of the Magbubukid party-list.

Governor Elias Bulut Jr.'s daughter, provincial board member Kyle Bulut of Lakas–CMD, won the election unopposed.

Candidate	Party	Votes	%
Kyle Bulut	Lakas–CMD	56,046	100.00
Total		56,046	100.00
Valid votes		56,046	77.25
Invalid/blank votes		16,502	22.75
Total votes		72,548	100.00
Registered voters/turnout		83,441	86.95
Lakas gain from KBL			
Source: Commission on Elections

=== Provincial Board ===
Since Apayao's reclassification as a 2nd class province in 2022, the Apayao Provincial Board is composed of 14 board members, 10 of whom are elected.

The Nationalist People's Coalition tied with Lakas–CMD at five seats each.

Party	Votes	%	Seats	+/–
Nationalist People's Coalition	120,654	54.91	5	+2
Lakas–CMD	99,061	45.09	5	New
Total	219,715	100.00	10	+2
Total votes	72,548	–		
Registered voters/turnout	83,441	86.95		
Source: Commission on Elections

==== 1st district ====
Apayao's 1st provincial district consists of the municipalities of Calanasan, Conner and Kabugao. Five board members are elected from this provincial district.

Five candidates were included in the ballot.

Candidate	Party	Votes	%
Alison Betat (incumbent)	Nationalist People's Coalition	20,076	20.39
Jun Labueng (incumbent)	Nationalist People's Coalition	20,015	20.33
Iying Agnas-Real	Lakas–CMD	19,621	19.93
Vincent Talattag (incumbent)	Nationalist People's Coalition	19,464	19.77
Girlie Laylay-Uy	Lakas–CMD	19,279	19.58
Total		98,455	100.00
Total votes		34,068	–
Registered voters/turnout		39,708	85.80
Source: Commission on Elections

==== 2nd district ====
Apayao's 2nd provincial district consists of the municipalities of Flora, Luna, Pudtol and Santa Marcela. Five board members are elected from this provincial district.

Eight candidates were included in the ballot.

Candidate	Party	Votes	%
Josie Bangsil	Nationalist People's Coalition	20,729	17.09
Myla Ballesteros	Lakas–CMD	19,265	15.89
Hector Reuel Pascua	Nationalist People's Coalition	18,683	15.41
Ricky Laoat	Lakas–CMD	15,515	12.79
Vic Maruquin	Lakas–CMD	13,078	10.79
Revalone Albano	Lakas–CMD	12,303	10.15
Emmanuel Galleon	Nationalist People's Coalition	11,111	9.16
Bobby Balanay	Nationalist People's Coalition	10,576	8.72
Total		121,260	100.00
Total votes		38,480	–
Registered voters/turnout		43,733	87.99
Source: Commission on Elections

== Baguio ==
=== Mayor ===
Incumbent Mayor Benjamin Magalong of the Nationalist People's Coalition ran for a third term.

Magalong won re-election against representative Mark Go (Nacionalista Party), city councilor Benny Bomogao (Independent), and three other candidates.

Candidate	Party	Votes	%
Benjamin Magalong (incumbent)	Nationalist People's Coalition	55,497	42.80
Mark Go	Nacionalista Party	43,732	33.73
Benny Bomogao	Independent	27,561	21.26
Mark Andrew Directo	Independent	2,446	1.89
Rei Ann Cayetano	Independent	346	0.27
Abdul Camo	Independent	70	0.05
Total		129,652	100.00
Valid votes		129,652	98.12
Invalid/blank votes		2,489	1.88
Total votes		132,141	100.00
Registered voters/turnout		166,416	79.40
NPC hold			
Source: Commission on Elections

=== Vice Mayor ===
Incumbent Vice Mayor Faustino Olowan of the Partido Federal ng Pilipinas ran for a third term. He was previously affiliated with the Nacionalista Party.

Olowan won re-election against city councilor Mylen Yaranon (Nacionalista Party).

Candidate	Party	Votes	%
Faustino Olowan (incumbent)	Partido Federal ng Pilipinas	86,302	70.95
Mylen Yaranon	Nacionalista Party	35,338	29.05
Total		121,640	100.00
Valid votes		121,640	92.05
Invalid/blank votes		10,501	7.95
Total votes		132,141	100.00
Registered voters/turnout		166,416	79.40
PFP hold			
Source: Commission on Elections

=== City Council ===
The Baguio City Council is composed of 15 councilors, 12 of whom are elected.

39 candidates were included in the ballot.

Lakas–CMD won four seats, becoming the largest party in the city council.

Party	Votes	%	Seats	+/–
Lakas–CMD	280,725	24.05	4	+3
Nacionalista Party	211,059	18.08	1	–1
Partido Federal ng Pilipinas	157,523	13.49	1	0
Nationalist People's Coalition	72,218	6.19	1	0
Liberal Party	56,196	4.81	1	–3
People's Reform Party	30,603	2.62	0	0
Independent	359,048	30.76	4	+2
Total	1,167,372	100.00	12	0
Total votes	132,141	–		
Registered voters/turnout	166,416	79.40		
Source: Commission on Elections

Candidate	Party	Votes	%
Edison Bilog	Lakas–CMD	58,218	4.99
Joel Alangsab	Lakas–CMD	57,174	4.90
Jose Molintas (incumbent)	Liberal Party	56,196	4.81
Leandro Yangot Jr. (incumbent)	Nacionalista Party	55,972	4.79
Vladimir Cayabas (incumbent)	Independent	53,461	4.58
Peter Fianza (incumbent)	Independent	51,602	4.42
Van Dicang	Independent	49,434	4.23
Fred Bagbagen (incumbent)	Partido Federal ng Pilipinas	48,642	4.17
Paolo Salvosa	Independent	48,544	4.16
Betty Lourdes Tabanda (incumbent)	Lakas–CMD	47,807	4.10
Yuri Weygan	Nationalist People's Coalition	47,054	4.03
Elmer Datuin (incumbent)	Lakas–CMD	46,036	3.94
Michael Lawana	Nacionalista Party	41,042	3.52
Esther Litlit	Nacionalista Party	37,136	3.18
Elaine Sembrano	Lakas–CMD	36,657	3.14
JD Balajadia-Tabora	Nacionalista Party	36,424	3.12
Eddie Carta	Lakas–CMD	34,833	2.98
Jun Orca	Partido Federal ng Pilipinas	32,282	2.77
Ron Perez	Partido Federal ng Pilipinas	31,577	2.70
Levy Orcales	People's Reform Party	30,603	2.62
Pam Cariño	Partido Federal ng Pilipinas	28,256	2.42
John Glenn Gaerlan	Nationalist People's Coalition	25,164	2.16
Esteban Somngi	Independent	23,770	2.04
Mike Humiding	Nacionalista Party	20,893	1.79
Standford Ang	Nacionalista Party	19,592	1.68
Murphy Maspil Sr.	Independent	18,250	1.56
Kurt Justin Santiago	Independent	17,532	1.50
Spencer Basbas	Independent	16,882	1.45
John Rhey Mananeng	Partido Federal ng Pilipinas	16,766	1.44
Eric James Kelly	Independent	14,301	1.23
Ryan Javier	Independent	11,948	1.02
Ted Tan	Independent	11,683	1.00
Saturnino Lem-ew	Independent	11,131	0.95
Salvador Francisco Neri IV	Independent	8,114	0.70
Martin Manodon	Independent	6,084	0.52
Alberto Ramos Jr.	Independent	5,207	0.45
Edilberto Gapuz	Independent	4,100	0.35
Tia Imadhay	Independent	3,745	0.32
Norma Benuyo	Independent	3,260	0.28
Total		1,167,372	100.00
Total votes		132,141	–
Registered voters/turnout		166,416	79.40
Source: Commission on Elections

== Benguet ==
=== Governor ===
Incumbent Governor Melchor Diclas of Lakas–CMD ran for a third term. He was previously affiliated with the PDP–Laban.

Diclas won re-election against provincial board member Ruben Paoad (Independent), George Punasen (Independent), and former Benguet vice governor Johnny Waguis (Partido Federal ng Pilipinas).

Candidate	Party	Votes	%
Melchor Diclas (incumbent)	Lakas–CMD	116,212	57.44
Ruben Paoad	Independent	34,657	17.13
George Punasen	Independent	32,525	16.07
Johnny Waguis	Partido Federal ng Pilipinas	18,940	9.36
Total		202,334	100.00
Valid votes		202,334	95.93
Invalid/blank votes		8,593	4.07
Total votes		210,927	100.00
Registered voters/turnout		249,729	84.46
Lakas hold			
Source: Commission on Elections

=== Vice Governor ===
Incumbent Vice Governor Tagel Felipe of Partido Federal ng Pilipinas (PFP) ran for the House of Representatives in Benguet's lone legislative district. He was elected as an independent with 52.43% of the vote in 2022.

The PFP nominated former Benguet vice governor Nelson Dangwa, who was defeated by provincial board member Marie Rose Fongwan-Kepes of Lakas–CMD. Provincial board member Pandong Balaodan (Independent), and Sammy Paran (Independent) also ran for vice governor.

Candidate	Party	Votes	%
Marie Rose Fongwan-Kepes	Lakas–CMD	116,169	59.95
Nelson Dangwa	Partido Federal ng Pilipinas	53,854	27.79
Pandong Balaodan	Independent	17,477	9.02
Sammy Paran	Independent	6,284	3.24
Total		193,784	100.00
Valid votes		193,784	91.87
Invalid/blank votes		17,143	8.13
Total votes		210,927	100.00
Registered voters/turnout		249,729	84.46
Lakas gain from PFP			
Source: Commission on Elections

=== Provincial Board ===
The Benguet Provincial Board is composed of 14 board members, 10 of whom are elected.

Lakas–CMD won eight seats, gaining a majority in the provincial board.

Party	Votes	%	Seats	+/–
Lakas–CMD	464,294	62.40	8	New
Partido Federal ng Pilipinas	231,785	31.15	1	+1
United Benguet Party	46,257	6.22	1	–6
Independent	1,721	0.23	0	–1
Total	744,057	100.00	10	0
Total votes	210,927	–		
Registered voters/turnout	249,729	84.46		
Source: Commission on Elections

==== 1st district ====
Benguet's 1st provincial district consists of the municipalities of Bokod, Itogon, Kabayan, Sablan and Tuba. Four board members are elected from this provincial district.

10 candidates were included in the ballot.

Candidate	Party	Votes	%
Sander Fianza (incumbent)	Lakas–CMD	36,154	16.42
Johannes Amuasen (incumbent)	Lakas–CMD	34,694	15.76
Charmaine Molintas	Lakas–CMD	31,922	14.50
Thomas Wales Jr.	United Benguet Party	31,289	14.21
Myrna Nazarro	Partido Federal ng Pilipinas	24,317	11.04
Jani Galutan	Partido Federal ng Pilipinas	22,521	10.23
Jhonar Rebutazo	Partido Federal ng Pilipinas	19,503	8.86
Lison Latawan Jr.	United Benguet Party	14,968	6.80
Roi David	Lakas–CMD	3,107	1.41
Erlinda Balog	Independent	1,721	0.78
Total		220,196	100.00
Total votes		75,830	–
Registered voters/turnout		89,108	85.10
Source: Commission on Elections

==== 2nd district ====
Benguet's 2nd provincial district consists of the municipalities of Atok, Bakun, Buguias, Kapangan, Kibungan, La Trinidad, Mankayan and Tublay. Six board members are elected from this provincial district.

11 candidates were included in the ballot.

Candidate	Party	Votes	%
Ruben Tinda-an	Lakas–CMD	67,731	12.93
Romeo Salda	Lakas–CMD	63,802	12.18
Manny Fermin	Lakas–CMD	63,405	12.10
Armando Lauro	Lakas–CMD	59,379	11.33
Neptali Camsol (incumbent)	Lakas–CMD	57,547	10.99
Jim Botiwey	Partido Federal ng Pilipinas	48,019	9.17
Frenzel Ayong	Lakas–CMD	46,553	8.89
Joel Tingbaoen Jr. (incumbent)	Partido Federal ng Pilipinas	37,853	7.23
Alex Castañeda	Partido Federal ng Pilipinas	34,157	6.52
Anjie Bugtong	Partido Federal ng Pilipinas	25,087	4.79
Thorrsson Montes Keith	Partido Federal ng Pilipinas	20,328	3.88
Total		523,861	100.00
Total votes		135,097	–
Registered voters/turnout		160,621	84.11
Source: Commission on Elections

== Ifugao ==
=== Governor ===
Incumbent Governor Jerry Dalipog of Lakas–CMD ran for a third term. He was previously affiliated with Kilusang Bagong Lipunan.

Dalipog won re-election against former Ifugao governor Eugene Balitang (Partido Federal ng Pilipinas), and two other candidates.

Candidate	Party	Votes	%
Jerry Dalipog (incumbent)	Lakas–CMD	80,486	70.43
Eugene Balitang	Partido Federal ng Pilipinas	30,833	26.98
Romy Ballatong	Independent	2,501	2.19
Rolando Paligan	Independent	465	0.41
Total		114,285	100.00
Valid votes		114,285	96.99
Invalid/blank votes		3,550	3.01
Total votes		117,835	100.00
Registered voters/turnout		136,318	86.44
Lakas hold			
Source: Commission on Elections

=== Vice Governor ===
Incumbent Vice Governor Glenn Prudenciano of Lakas–CMD ran for a third term. He was previously affiliated with the Liberal Party.

Prudenciano was defeated by Lagawe mayor Omar Habawel of the PDP–Laban.

Candidate	Party	Votes	%
Omar Habawel	PDP–Laban	67,874	61.04
Glenn Prudenciano (incumbent)	Lakas–CMD	43,328	38.96
Total		111,202	100.00
Valid votes		111,202	94.37
Invalid/blank votes		6,633	5.63
Total votes		117,835	100.00
Registered voters/turnout		136,318	86.44
PDP–Laban gain from Lakas			
Source: Commission on Elections

=== Provincial Board ===
Since Ifugao's reclassification as a 2nd class province in 2025, the Ifugao Provincial Board is composed of 13 board members, 10 of whom are elected.

Lakas–CMD won five seats, becoming the largest party in the provincial board.

Party	Votes	%	Seats	+/–
Lakas–CMD	187,015	40.37	5	New
Partido Federal ng Pilipinas	99,132	21.40	2	New
Nationalist People's Coalition	40,161	8.67	1	New
Independent	136,978	29.57	2	–3
Total	463,286	100.00	10	+2
Total votes	117,835	–		
Registered voters/turnout	136,318	86.44		
Source: Commission on Elections

==== 1st district ====
Ifugao's 1st provincial district consists of the municipalities of Asipulo, Hingyon, Hungduan, Kiangan, Lagawe, Lamut and Tinoc. Six board members are elected from this provincial district.

10 candidates were included in the ballot.

Candidate	Party	Votes	%
Jordan Gullitiw (incumbent)	Independent	42,246	14.17
Pedro Mayam-o	Partido Federal ng Pilipinas	41,704	13.99
Jaweh Habbiling	Partido Federal ng Pilipinas	41,531	13.93
Josel Guyguyon (incumbent)	Lakas–CMD	40,062	13.44
Alberto Binlang Jr. (incumbent)	Lakas–CMD	39,721	13.33
Geronimo Bimohya	Lakas–CMD	37,558	12.60
David Dumangeng	Independent	24,447	8.20
Julio Tindungan	Independent	13,690	4.59
Manuel Uminyad	Independent	10,439	3.50
Richard Calingayan	Independent	6,638	2.23
Total		298,036	100.00
Total votes		66,792	–
Registered voters/turnout		78,414	85.18
Source: Commission on Elections

==== 2nd district ====
Ifugao's 2nd provincial district consists of the municipalities of Aguinaldo, Alfonso Lista, Banaue and Mayoyao. Four board members are elected from this provincial district.

10 candidates were included in the ballot.

Candidate	Party	Votes	%
Gaspar Chilagan Jr.	Nationalist People's Coalition	31,259	18.92
Orlando Addug (incumbent)	Independent	24,904	15.07
Jojo Odan (incumbent)	Lakas–CMD	23,633	14.30
Peter Bunnag (incumbent)	Lakas–CMD	23,445	14.19
Perfecta Dulnuan (incumbent)	Lakas–CMD	22,596	13.67
Jun Dumar	Partido Federal ng Pilipinas	15,897	9.62
Marcenio Himmoldang	Nationalist People's Coalition	8,902	5.39
Samuel Angawa	Independent	6,669	4.04
Fernando Bahatan	Independent	5,472	3.31
Sanjeeve Mahicon	Independent	2,473	1.50
Total		165,250	100.00
Total votes		51,043	–
Registered voters/turnout		57,904	88.15
Source: Commission on Elections

== Kalinga ==
=== Governor ===
Incumbent Governor James Edduba of Lakas–CMD ran for a second term.

Edduba won re-election against Kalinga vice governor Jocel Baac (Partido Federal ng Pilipinas).

Candidate	Party	Votes	%
James Edduba (incumbent)	Lakas–CMD	75,305	55.23
Jocel Baac	Partido Federal ng Pilipinas	61,035	44.77
Total		136,340	100.00
Valid votes		136,340	97.00
Invalid/blank votes		4,214	3.00
Total votes		140,554	100.00
Registered voters/turnout		158,555	88.65
Lakas hold			
Source: Commission on Elections

=== Vice Governor ===
Incumbent Vice Governor Jocel Baac of the Partido Federal ng Pilipinas (PFP) ran for governor of Kalinga. He was previously affiliated with Aksyon Demokratiko.

The PFP nominated former Kalinga vice governor Dave Odiem, who won the election against provincial board members Mark Aldrich Diasen (Independent), Danzel Michael Langkit (Reform PH Party) and Antonio Bakilan (Independent).

Candidate	Party	Votes	%
Dave Odiem	Partido Federal ng Pilipinas	44,033	33.43
Mark Aldrich Diasen	Independent	35,394	26.87
Danzel Michael Langkit	Reform PH Party	27,997	21.26
Antonio Bakilan	Independent	24,290	18.44
Total		131,714	100.00
Valid votes		131,714	93.71
Invalid/blank votes		8,840	6.29
Total votes		140,554	100.00
Registered voters/turnout		158,555	88.65
PFP hold			
Source: Commission on Elections

=== Provincial Board ===
Since Kalinga's reclassification as a 2nd class province in 2025, the Kalinga Provincial Board is composed of 14 board members, 10 of whom are elected.

The Nacionalista Party won four seats, becoming the largest party in the provincial board.

Party	Votes	%	Seats	+/–
Nacionalista Party	141,118	33.08	4	+2
Partido Federal ng Pilipinas	67,519	15.83	1	New
Liberal Party	41,499	9.73	1	+1
Nationalist People's Coalition	38,874	9.11	1	New
Aksyon Demokratiko	26,152	6.13	1	0
Independent	111,430	26.12	2	New
Total	426,592	100.00	10	+2
Total votes	140,554	–		
Registered voters/turnout	158,555	88.65		
Source: Commission on Elections

==== 1st district ====
Kalinga's 1st provincial district consists of the municipalities of Balbalan, Lubuagan, Pasil, Pinukpuk and Tinglayan. Four board members are elected from this provincial district.

Nine candidates were included in the ballot.

Candidate	Party	Votes	%
Roger Saga-oc (incumbent)	Nacionalista Party	28,382	16.37
Romeo Saclag	Independent	26,347	15.20
Harley Duguiang (incumbent)	Aksyon Demokratiko	26,152	15.09
Emilio Kitongan	Nacionalista Party	23,832	13.75
Sikoy Lucas	Independent	19,489	11.24
Hilario Aggalao	Independent	13,899	8.02
Johnny Tiwang	Partido Federal ng Pilipinas	13,160	7.59
Maria Socorro Saclag	Independent	12,756	7.36
Alfredo Gamongan Sr.	Partido Federal ng Pilipinas	9,312	5.37
Total		173,329	100.00
Total votes		54,091	–
Registered voters/turnout		59,667	90.65
Source: Commission on Elections

==== 2nd district ====
Kalinga's 2nd provincial district consists of the city of Tabuk and the municipalities of Rizal and Tanudan. Six board members are elected from this provincial district.

Six candidates were included in the ballot.

Candidate	Party	Votes	%
Camilo Lammawin Jr.	Partido Federal ng Pilipinas	45,047	17.79
Glenn Amla (incumbent)	Nacionalista Party	44,515	17.58
Chester Alunday	Nacionalista Party	44,389	17.53
Chris Donaal	Liberal Party	41,499	16.39
Alfredo Dangani	Independent	38,939	15.37
Bernard Glenn Dao-as	Nationalist People's Coalition	38,874	15.35
Total		253,263	100.00
Total votes		86,463	–
Registered voters/turnout		98,888	87.44
Source: Commission on Elections

== Mountain Province ==
=== Governor ===
Incumbent Governor Bonifacio Lacwasan of the Partido Federal ng Pilipinas ran for a third term. He was previously affiliated with the PDP–Laban.

Lacwasan won re-election against former Sagada mayor Eduardo Latawan Jr. (Independent).

Candidate	Party	Votes	%
Bonifacio Lacwasan (incumbent)	Partido Federal ng Pilipinas	50,666	52.04
Eduardo Latawan Jr.	Independent	46,685	47.96
Total		97,351	100.00
Valid votes		97,351	97.98
Invalid/blank votes		2,012	2.02
Total votes		99,363	100.00
Registered voters/turnout		121,647	81.68
PFP hold			
Source: Commission on Elections

=== Vice Governor ===
Incumbent Vice Governor Francis Tauli of the Partido Federal ng Pilipinas ran for a third term. He was previously affiliated with the PDP–Laban.

Tauli was defeated by Jet Dominguez, an independent candidate. Three other candidates ran for vice governor.

Candidate	Party	Votes	%
Jet Dominguez	Independent	46,633	51.11
Francis Tauli (incumbent)	Partido Federal ng Pilipinas	37,760	41.38
Miyo Carlos	Independent	4,345	4.76
Albert Paday-os	Independent	1,465	1.61
Cleto Chacapna Jr.	Independent	1,038	1.14
Total		91,241	100.00
Valid votes		91,241	91.83
Invalid/blank votes		8,122	8.17
Total votes		99,363	100.00
Registered voters/turnout		121,647	81.68
PFP hold			
Source: Commission on Elections

=== Provincial Board ===
Since the Mountain Province's reclassification as a 2nd class province in 2025, the Mountain Province Provincial Board is composed of 14 board members, 10 of whom are elected.

The Partido Federal ng Pilipinas won four seats, becoming the largest party in the provincial board.

Party	Votes	%	Seats	+/–
Nacionalista Party	133,824	35.85	3	+1
Partido Federal ng Pilipinas	90,642	24.28	4	New
Laban ng Demokratikong Pilipino	20,282	5.43	1	0
Katipunan ng Nagkakaisang Pilipino	17,885	4.79	0	New
Independent	110,659	29.64	2	+1
Total	373,292	100.00	10	+2
Total votes	99,363	–		
Registered voters/turnout	121,647	81.68		
Source: Commission on Elections

==== 1st district ====
Mountain Province's 1st provincial district consists of the municipalities of Barlig, Bontoc, Natonin, Paracelis and Sadanga. Five board members are elected from this provincial district.

11 candidates were included in the ballot.

Candidate	Party	Votes	%
Roy Gammonac	Nacionalista Party	27,734	15.05
Federico Onsat (incumbent)	Partido Federal ng Pilipinas	22,301	12.10
Ezra Samson Gomez (incumbent)	Laban ng Demokratikong Pilipino	20,282	11.01
Joshua Fronda (incumbent)	Partido Federal ng Pilipinas	20,220	10.98
Janice Barillo	Nacionalista Party	19,451	10.56
Mateo Chiyawan	Katipunan ng Nagkakaisang Pilipino	17,885	9.71
Tancio Miranda	Independent	15,053	8.17
Jose Biangalen	Nacionalista Party	14,147	7.68
Maximillian Claver	Independent	11,250	6.11
John Pelew	Nacionalista Party	10,841	5.88
Vidastos Focao	Independent	5,066	2.75
Total		184,230	100.00
Total votes		49,135	–
Registered voters/turnout		58,381	84.16
Source: Commission on Elections

==== 2nd district ====
Mountain Province's 2nd provincial district consists of the municipalities of Bauko. Besao, Sabangan, Sagada and Tadian. Five board members are elected from this provincial district.

11 candidates were included in the ballot.

Candidate	Party	Votes	%
Jowee Dominguez	Independent	28,507	15.08
Sally Banaken-Ullalim	Independent	25,035	13.24
Ricardo Masidong Jr. (incumbent)	Partido Federal ng Pilipinas	24,261	12.83
Johnson Bantog II (incumbent)	Partido Federal ng Pilipinas	23,860	12.62
Henry Bastian Jr. (incumbent)	Nacionalista Party	21,947	11.61
Bartolo Badecao	Nacionalista Party	21,521	11.38
Anselmo Andayan	Nacionalista Party	18,183	9.62
Andres Sapdoy	Independent	10,895	5.76
Jimmy Cajigan	Independent	6,134	3.24
Akay Manodon	Independent	5,780	3.06
Perfecto Igid	Independent	2,939	1.55
Total		189,062	100.00
Total votes		50,228	–
Registered voters/turnout		63,266	79.39
Source: Commission on Elections

== Election-related incidents ==
The Philippine National Police said that the region has the most election-related incidents, with 11 cases recorded.

On February 28, 2025, the convoy of a mayoral candidate of Pidigan, Abra, was ambushed in Pilar, killing two people including a barangay chairman. On April 7, a candidate for councilor in Lagangilang, Abra, shot dead a barangay chairman during a dispute with a rival candidate before being shot dead himself by an unidentified individual. On April 21, a shootout between the convoys of a mayoral candidate in Tayum, Abra and a barangay kagawad left one person dead and another injured. Following the incident, Joseph Bernos, the mayor of La Paz, Abra who was running for Congress, was accused of threatening a journalist from DZRH who reported on the shooting.

On polling day, two people were injured after gunmen opened fire near a polling station in Bangued, Abra. Two poll watchers were removed in Abra after a video went viral of them shading ballots for senior citizens.
