= 2022 Philippine local elections in the Cordillera Administrative Region =

- May 9, 2022
- Gubernatorial elections
- 6 provincial governors and 1 city mayor
Party	Seats	+/–
Lakas	2	+2
NPC	2	+1
Asenso	1	0
KBL	1	New
PDP–Laban	1	−3
This lists parties that won seats. See the complete results below.
- Vice gubernatorial elections
- 6 provincial vice governors and 1 city vice mayor
Party	Seats	+/–
Aksyon	1	New
Asenso	1	0
KBL	1	New
Liberal	1	−1
Nacionalista	1	0
PDP–Laban	1	−2
Independent	1	+1
This lists parties that won seats. See the complete results below.
- Provincial Board elections
- 50 provincial board members and 12 city councilors
Party	Seats	+/–
PDP–Laban	13	−4
Asenso	8	0
UBP	7	New
Liberal	6	+1
Nacionalista	6	+3
NPC	4	−3
Aksyon	1	New
KBL	1	0
Lakas	1	−2
LDP	1	+1
PFP	1	0
PPM	1	New
Reporma	1	New
Independent	11	0
This lists parties that won seats. See the complete results below.

The 2022 Philippine local elections in the Cordillera Administrative Region were held on May 9, 2022.

== Summary ==
=== Governors ===
Province/city	Incumbent	Incumbent's party	Winner	Winner's party	Winning margin
Abra	Joy Bernos	Asenso Abrenio	Dominic Valera	Asenso Abrenio	7.42%
Apayao	Eleanor Begtang	NPC	Elias Bulut Jr.	NPC	Unopposed
Baguio (HUC)	Benjamin Magalong	NPC	Benjamin Magalong	NPC	12.61%
Benguet	Melchor Diclas	Lakas	Melchor Diclas	Lakas	24.70%
Ifugao	Jerry Dalipog	KBL	Jerry Dalipog	KBL	62.84%
Kalinga	Ferdinand Tubban	PDP–Laban	James Edduba	Lakas	3.14%
Mountain Province	Bonifacio Lacwasan	PDP–Laban	Bonifacio Lacwasan	PDP–Laban	78.60%

=== Vice governors ===
Province/city	Incumbent	Incumbent's party	Winner	Winner's party	Winning margin
Abra	Ronald Balao-as	Asenso Abrenio	Joy Bernos	Asenso Abrenio	47.58%
Apayao	Remy Albano	KBL	Remy Albano	KBL	1.10%
Baguio (HUC)	Faustino Olowan	Nacionalista	Faustino Olowan	Nacionalista	30.76%
Benguet	Johnny Waguis	UBP	Tagel Felipe	Independent	16.87%
Ifugao	Glenn Prudenciano	Liberal	Glenn Prudenciano	Liberal	6.20%
Kalinga	Dave Odiem	Nacionalista	Jocel Baac	Aksyon	1.11%
Mountain Province	Francis Tauli	PDP–Laban	Francis Tauli	PDP–Laban	5.39%

=== Provincial boards ===
Province/city	Seats	Party control		Composition
Province/city	Seats	Previous	Result	Composition
Abra	8 elected 4 ex-officio	Asenso Abrenio	Asenso Abrenio	Asenso Abrenio (8)
Apayao	8 elected 4 ex-officio	No majority	No majority	NPC (3); PDP–Laban (3); Independent (2)
Baguio (HUC)	12 elected 3 ex-officio	No majority	No majority	Liberal (4); Nacionalista (2); Lakas (1); NPC (1); PFP (1); PPM (1); Independent (2)
Benguet	10 elected 4 ex-officio	No majority	No majority	UBP (7); PDP–Laban (2); Independent (1)
Ifugao	8 elected 3 ex-officio	No majority	No majority	Liberal (2); KBL (1); Independent (5)
Kalinga	8 elected 4 ex-officio	No majority	No majority	PDP–Laban (4); Nacionalista (2); Aksyon (1); Reporma (1)
Mountain Province	8 elected 4 ex-officio	No majority	No majority	PDP–Laban (4); Nacionalista (2); LDP (1); Independent (1)

== Abra ==
=== Governor ===
Incumbent Governor Joy Bernos of Asenso Abrenio ran for vice governor of Abra.

Asenso Abrenio nominated Bernos' father, Bangued mayor Dominic Valera, who won the election against former Abra governor Takit Bersamin (Partido para sa Demokratikong Reporma) and two other candidates.

Candidate	Party	Votes	%
Dominic Valera	Asenso Abrenio	74,337	51.10
Takit Bersamin	Partido para sa Demokratikong Reporma	63,537	43.68
Deydey Ifurung	Aksyon Demokratiko	6,210	4.27
Xandro Cariño	Independent	1,383	0.95
Total		145,467	100.00
Total votes		159,540	–
Registered voters/turnout		182,696	87.33
Asenso Abrenio hold			
Source: Commission on Elections

=== Vice Governor ===
Incumbent Vice Governor Ronald Balao-as of Asenso Abrenio ran for mayor of Boliney.

Asenso Abrenio nominated Abra governor Joy Bernos, who won the election against Chari Bersamin (Partido para sa Demokratikong Reporma) and Roger Luna (Aksyon Demokratiko).

Candidate	Party	Votes	%
Joy Bernos	Asenso Abrenio	102,353	71.42
Chari Bersamin	Partido para sa Demokratikong Reporma	34,172	23.84
Roger Luna	Aksyon Demokratiko	6,784	4.73
Total		143,309	100.00
Total votes		159,540	–
Registered voters/turnout		182,696	87.33
Asenso Abrenio hold			
Source: Commission on Elections

=== Provincial Board ===
The Abra Provincial Board is composed of 12 board members, eight of whom are elected.

Asenso Abrenio won eight seats, maintaining its majority in the provincial board.

Party	Votes	%	Seats	+/–
Asenso Abrenio	373,180	89.71	8	0
Aksyon Demokratiko	42,814	10.29	0	New
Total	415,994	100.00	8	0
Total votes	159,540	–		
Registered voters/turnout	182,696	87.33		

==== 1st district ====
Abra's 1st provincial district consists of the municipalities of Boliney, Bucay, Bucloc, Daguioman, Langiden, Luba, Manabo, Peñarrubia, Pidigan, Pilar, Sallapadan, San Isidro, San Quintin, Tubo and Villaviciosa. Four board members are elected from this provincial district.

Six candidates were included in the ballot.

Candidate	Party	Votes	%
Victorino Baroña Jr.	Asenso Abrenio	42,955	23.74
Henrietta Gayao	Asenso Abrenio	39,464	21.82
Rodolfo de la Paz (incumbent)	Asenso Abrenio	38,613	21.34
Amador Diaz	Asenso Abrenio	38,376	21.21
David Puglay	Aksyon Demokratiko	16,335	9.03
Carlos Aquino	Aksyon Demokratiko	5,159	2.85
Total		180,902	100.00
Total votes		68,276	–
Registered voters/turnout		78,693	86.76
Source: Commission on Elections

==== 2nd district ====
Abra's 2nd provincial district consists of the municipalities of Bangued, Danglas, Dolores, La Paz, Lacub, Lagangilang, Lagayan, Licuan-Baay, Malibcong, San Juan, Tayum and Tineg. Four board members are elected from this provincial district.

Seven candidates were included in the ballot.

Candidate	Party	Votes	%
Russell Bragas	Asenso Abrenio	65,547	27.88
Allan Seares (incumbent)	Asenso Abrenio	52,826	22.47
Gina Jenkins (incumbent)	Asenso Abrenio	48,803	20.76
Pat Abaya (incumbent)	Asenso Abrenio	46,596	19.82
Joy Chrisma Luna	Aksyon Demokratiko	14,009	5.96
Fremie Galinada	Aksyon Demokratiko	3,776	1.61
Berna Joson	Aksyon Demokratiko	3,535	1.50
Total		235,092	100.00
Total votes		91,264	–
Registered voters/turnout		104,003	87.75
Source: Commission on Elections

== Apayao ==
=== Governor ===
Incumbent Governor Eleanor Begtang of PDP–Laban ran for the House of Representatives in Apayao's lone legislative district.

Begtang endorsed her brother, representative Elias Bulut Jr. (Nationalist People's Coalition), who won the election unopposed.

Candidate	Party	Votes	%
Elias Bulut Jr.	Nationalist People's Coalition	49,851	100.00
Total		49,851	100.00
Total votes		67,563	–
Registered voters/turnout		78,454	86.12
NPC gain from PDP–Laban			
Source: Commission on Elections

=== Vice Governor ===
Incumbent Vice Governor Remy Albano of Kilusang Bagong Lipunan ran for a third term. He was previously affiliated with the Liberal Party.

Albano won re-election against provincial board member Myla Ballesteros (Independent).

Candidate	Party	Votes	%
Remy Albano	Kilusang Bagong Lipunan	28,279	50.55
Myla Ballesteros	Independent	27,665	49.45
Total		55,944	100.00
Total votes		67,563	–
Registered voters/turnout		78,454	86.12
KBL hold			
Source: Commission on Elections

=== Provincial Board ===
The Apayao Provincial Board is composed of 12 board members, eight of whom are elected.

The Nationalist People's Coalition tied with PDP–Laban at three seats each.

Party	Votes	%	Seats	+/–
Nationalist People's Coalition	74,916	46.45	3	–1
PDP–Laban	52,420	32.50	3	0
Independent	33,934	21.04	2	New
Total	161,270	100.00	8	0
Total votes	67,563	–		
Registered voters/turnout	78,454	86.12		

==== 1st district ====
Apayao's 1st provincial district consists of the municipalities of Calanasan, Conner and Kabugao. Four board members are elected from this provincial district.

Six candidates were included in the ballot.

Candidate	Party	Votes	%
Kyle Bulut	Nationalist People's Coalition	18,013	22.59
Alison Betat	Nationalist People's Coalition	16,757	21.02
Vincent Talattag	Nationalist People's Coalition	14,451	18.13
Jun Labueng	Independent	12,209	15.31
Iying Real (incumbent)	Nationalist People's Coalition	11,776	14.77
Sebastian Himma	Independent	6,521	8.18
Total		79,727	100.00
Total votes		32,211	–
Registered voters/turnout		37,396	86.13
Source: Commission on Elections

==== 2nd district ====
Apayao's 2nd provincial district consists of the municipalities of Flora, Luna, Pudtol and Santa Marcela. Four board members are elected from this provincial district.

Five candidates were included in the ballot.

Candidate	Party	Votes	%
Elmer Molina (incumbent)	PDP–Laban	18,779	23.03
Emiliano Galleon (incumbent)	PDP–Laban	17,916	21.97
Mcleen Julian (incumbent)	PDP–Laban	15,725	19.28
Elmer Canonizado	Independent	15,204	18.65
Nenita Aguilar	Nationalist People's Coalition	13,919	17.07
Total		81,543	100.00
Total votes		35,352	–
Registered voters/turnout		41,058	86.10
Source: Commission on Elections

== Baguio ==
=== Mayor ===
Incumbent Mayor Benjamin Magalong of the Nationalist People's Coalition ran for a second term.

Magalong won re-election against former Baguio mayor Mauricio Domogan (Lakas–CMD) former Baguio vice mayor Edison Bilog (Partido Federal ng Pilipinas) and Jeffrey Pinic (Independent).

Candidate	Party	Votes	%
Benjamin Magalong (incumbent)	Nationalist People's Coalition	70,342	51.75
Mauricio Domogan	Lakas–CMD	53,198	39.14
Edison Bilog	Partido Federal ng Pilipinas	12,061	8.87
Jeffrey Pinic	Independent	333	0.24
Total		135,934	100.00
Total votes		139,461	–
Registered voters/turnout		168,218	82.90
NPC hold			
Source: Commission on Elections

=== Vice Mayor ===
Incumbent Vice Mayor Faustino Olowan of the Nacionalista Party ran for a second term. He was previously affiliated with PDP–Laban.

Olowan won re-election against Michael Lawana (Independent) and city councilors Joel Alangsab (Independent) and Elaine Sembrano (Independent).

Candidate	Party	Votes	%
Faustino Olowan (incumbent)	Nacionalista Party	65,897	52.34
Michael Lawana	Independent	27,177	21.58
Joel Alangsab	Independent	19,465	15.46
Elaine Sembrano	Independent	13,368	10.62
Total		125,907	100.00
Total votes		139,461	–
Registered voters/turnout		168,218	82.90
Nacionalista hold			
Source: Commission on Elections

=== City Council ===
The Baguio City Council is composed of 15 councilors, 12 of whom are elected.

36 candidates were included in the ballot.

The Liberal Party won four seats, becoming the largest party in the city council.

Party	Votes	%	Seats	+/–
Liberal Party	285,599	23.04	4	+1
Nacionalista Party	213,747	17.24	2	+1
Lakas–CMD	173,889	14.03	1	+1
Nationalist People's Coalition	139,057	11.22	1	+1
Partido Federal ng Pilipinas	138,688	11.19	1	+1
Partido Pederal ng Maharlika	58,783	4.74	1	New
People's Reform Party	29,473	2.38	0	New
Partido Demokratiko Sosyalista ng Pilipinas	5,086	0.41	0	New
Independent	195,389	15.76	2	+2
Total	1,239,711	100.00	12	0
Total votes	139,461	–		
Registered voters/turnout	168,218	82.90		

Candidate	Party	Votes	%
Benny Bomogao (incumbent)	Lakas–CMD	71,441	5.76
Jose Molintas	Liberal Party	69,862	5.64
Arthur Allad-iw (incumbent)	Liberal Party	68,923	5.56
Betty Lourdes Tabanda (incumbent)	Nacionalista Party	67,108	5.41
Leandro Yañgot Jr.	Nacionalista Party	66,130	5.33
Isabelo Cosalan Jr. (incumbent)	Liberal Party	65,398	5.28
Mylen Yaranon (incumbent)	Liberal Party	62,408	5.03
Elmer Datuin	Partido Federal ng Pilipinas	60,844	4.91
Peter Fianza	Independent	60,283	4.86
Vladimir Cayabas (incumbent)	Partido Pederal ng Maharlika	58,783	4.74
Fred Bagbagen (incumbent)	Independent	58,300	4.70
Leah Fariñas (incumbent)	Nationalist People's Coalition	58,145	4.69
Len Ortega	Lakas–CMD	54,223	4.37
Ryan Mangusan	Lakas–CMD	48,225	3.89
Philian Weygan-Allan (incumbent)	Nacionalista Party	45,275	3.65
Glenn Gaerlan	Nacionalista Party	35,234	2.84
Pam Cariño	Nationalist People's Coalition	34,860	2.81
Levy Orcales	People's Reform Party	29,473	2.38
Michael Humiding	Partido Federal ng Pilipinas	24,485	1.98
Marlene de Castro	Nationalist People's Coalition	23,959	1.93
Criket Villareal	Nationalist People's Coalition	22,093	1.78
Vic Jimenez	Liberal Party	19,008	1.53
Murphy Maspil Sr.	Independent	17,865	1.44
Marix Carantes	Partido Federal ng Pilipinas	17,667	1.43
Mario de los Reyes	Independent	14,797	1.19
Rico-John Ferrer	Partido Federal ng Pilipinas	12,946	1.04
Noel Mabutas	Partido Federal ng Pilipinas	10,911	0.88
Gary Paul Abela	Independent	9,497	0.77
Marin Perez	Independent	9,063	0.73
Eddie Gapuz	Independent	8,632	0.70
Pablo Batnag	Independent	7,720	0.62
Richard Dollente	Partido Federal ng Pilipinas	5,981	0.48
Raymund Ruaro	Partido Federal ng Pilipinas	5,854	0.47
Alfonso Aviles	Independent	5,337	0.43
Regino Alambra	Partido Demokratiko Sosyalista ng Pilipinas	5,086	0.41
Gordon Monserrate	Independent	3,895	0.31
Total		1,239,711	100.00
Total votes		139,461	–
Registered voters/turnout		168,218	82.90
Source: Commission on Elections

== Benguet ==
=== Governor ===
Incumbent Governor Melchor Diclas of PDP–Laban ran for a second term.

Diclas won re-election against provincial board member Robert Namoro (Partido Federal ng Pilipinas) and three other candidates.

Candidate	Party	Votes	%
Melchor Diclas (incumbent)	PDP–Laban	112,345	57.62
Robert Namoro	Partido Federal ng Pilipinas	64,187	32.92
Jerry Marave	Kilusang Bagong Lipunan	15,352	7.87
Jerome Wakat	Independent	2,274	1.17
Alexander Tadina	Katipunan ng Kamalayang Kayumanggi	828	0.42
Total		194,986	100.00
Total votes		209,228	–
Registered voters/turnout		243,756	85.84
PDP–Laban hold			
Source: Commission on Elections

=== Vice Governor ===
Incumbent Vice Governor Johnny Waguis of the United Benguet Party ran for a second term. He was previously affiliated with PDP–Laban.

Waguis was defeated by Tagel Felipe, an independent. Provincial board member Jim Botiwey (Independent) also ran for vice governor.

Candidate	Party	Votes	%
Tagel Felipe	Independent	101,276	52.43
Johnny Waguis (incumbent)	United Benguet Party	68,681	35.56
Jim Botiwey	Independent	23,197	12.01
Total		193,154	100.00
Total votes		209,228	–
Registered voters/turnout		243,756	85.84
Independent gain from UBP			
Source: Commission on Elections

=== Provincial Board ===
The Benguet Provincial Board is composed of 14 board members, 10 of whom are elected.

The United Benguet Party won seven seats, becoming the largest party in the provincial board.

Party	Votes	%	Seats	+/–
United Benguet Party	344,835	45.26	7	New
PDP–Laban	96,070	12.61	2	–5
Partido para sa Demokratikong Reporma	48,190	6.33	0	New
Kilusang Bagong Lipunan	32,078	4.21	0	0
PROMDI	30,540	4.01	0	New
Partido Federal ng Pilipinas	29,859	3.92	0	0
Partido Pederal ng Maharlika	27,294	3.58	0	New
Nationalist People's Coalition	20,443	2.68	0	–1
Reform Party	19,238	2.53	0	New
Independent	113,301	14.87	1	+1
Total	761,848	100.00	10	0
Total votes	209,228	–		
Registered voters/turnout	243,756	85.84		

==== 1st district ====
Benguet's 1st provincial district consists of the municipalities of Bokod, Itogon, Kabayan, Sablan and Tuba. Four board members are elected from this provincial district.

12 candidates were included in the ballot.

Candidate	Party	Votes	%
Johannes Amuasen	United Benguet Party	29,938	13.40
Sander Fianza (incumbent)	United Benguet Party	28,992	12.97
Florencio Bentrez (incumbent)	United Benguet Party	28,821	12.90
Coy Nazarro (incumbent)	PDP–Laban	23,753	10.63
Johnny Galutan	Independent	22,995	10.29
Rocky-Charm Molintas	Nationalist People's Coalition	20,443	9.15
Cosme Galasgas Jr.	Independent	18,677	8.36
Leo Lawana	United Benguet Party	16,095	7.20
Arnulfo Milo	Kilusang Bagong Lipunan	15,402	6.89
Noel Saguid	Partido Pederal ng Maharlika	9,684	4.33
Alegre Bungsal	Kilusang Bagong Lipunan	7,239	3.24
Miranda Balog	Independent	1,430	0.64
Total		223,469	100.00
Total votes		76,483	–
Registered voters/turnout		89,165	85.78
Source: Commission on Elections

==== 2nd district ====
Benguet's 2nd provincial district consists of the municipalities of Atok, Bakun, Buguias, Kapangan, Kibungan, La Trinidad, Mankayan and Tublay. Six board members are elected from this provincial district.

24 candidates were included in the ballot.

Candidate	Party	Votes	%
Marierose Fongwan-Kepes	United Benguet Party	61,195	11.37
Pandong Balaodan (incumbent)	United Benguet Party	42,218	7.84
Roberto Canuto (incumbent)	United Benguet Party	41,680	7.74
Ruben Paoad (incumbent)	Independent	38,392	7.13
Joel Tingbaoen Jr.	PDP–Laban	36,745	6.83
Neptali Camsol (incumbent)	United Benguet Party	36,415	6.76
Alexander Castañeda	PDP–Laban	35,572	6.61
Susan Atayoc	United Benguet Party	33,383	6.20
Richard Kilaan	Partido para sa Demokratikong Reporma	33,361	6.20
Joel Cervantes	Partido Federal ng Pilipinas	29,859	5.55
Nardo Cayat	United Benguet Party	26,098	4.85
Art Shontogan	Reform PH - People's Party	19,238	3.57
Sario Copas	Partido para sa Demokratikong Reporma	14,829	2.75
Silvestre Aben	PROMDI	12,175	2.26
Reny Tabdi	Partido Pederal ng Maharlika	11,195	2.08
Mario Ludaes	PROMDI	9,758	1.81
Sendong Talaw Salvacio	Kilusang Bagong Lipunan	9,437	1.75
Mario Abuan	PROMDI	8,607	1.60
Manuel Lawana	Independent	7,941	1.47
Darwin Soriano	Independent	7,085	1.32
Lee Anthony Kuan	Independent	6,807	1.26
Julian Pelitan Jr.	Partido Pederal ng Maharlika	6,415	1.19
Renaldo Kitano	Independent	5,097	0.95
Clifford Malucay	Independent	4,877	0.91
Total		538,379	100.00
Total votes		132,745	–
Registered voters/turnout		154,591	85.87
Source: Commission on Elections

== Ifugao ==
=== Governor ===
Incumbent Governor Jerry Dalipog of Kilusang Bagong Lipunan ran for a second term. He was previously affiliated with the National Unity Party.

Dalipog won re-election against two other candidates.

Candidate	Party	Votes	%
Jerry Dalipog (incumbent)	Kilusang Bagong Lipunan	80,127	79.90
Julio Tindungan	Aksyon Demokratiko	17,112	17.06
Thomas Tundagui Jr.	Independent	3,047	3.04
Total		100,286	100.00
Total votes		113,067	–
Registered voters/turnout		134,428	84.11
KBL hold			
Source: Commission on Elections

=== Vice Governor ===
Incumbent Vice Governor Glenn Prudenciano of the Liberal Party ran for a second term.

Prudenciano won re-election against former Ifugao governor Pedro Mayam-o (PDP–Laban).

Candidate	Party	Votes	%
Glenn Prudenciano (incumbent)	Liberal Party	54,728	53.10
Pedro Mayam-o	PDP–Laban	48,337	46.90
Total		103,065	100.00
Total votes		113,067	–
Registered voters/turnout		134,428	84.11
Liberal hold			
Source: Commission on Elections

=== Provincial Board ===
The Ifugao Provincial Board is composed of 11 board members, eight of whom are elected.

The Liberal Party won two seats, becoming the largest party in the provincial board. However, most of the seats were won by independents.

Party	Votes	%	Seats	+/–
Kilusang Bagong Lipunan	73,400	20.78	1	New
Liberal Party	51,531	14.59	2	+1
Aksyon Demokratiko	18,010	5.10	0	New
Independent	210,297	59.53	5	–1
Total	353,238	100.00	8	0
Total votes	113,067	–		
Registered voters/turnout	134,428	84.11		

==== 1st district ====
Ifugao's 1st provincial district consists of the municipalities of Asipulo, Hingyon, Hungduan, Kiangan, Lagawe, Lamut and Tinoc. Four board members are elected from this provincial district.

Seven candidates were included in the ballot.

Candidate	Party	Votes	%
Alberto Binlang Jr.	Independent	35,931	17.71
Caesario Cabbigat (incumbent)	Kilusang Bagong Lipunan	33,683	16.60
Jordan Gullitiw	Independent	31,674	15.61
Joselito Guyguyon (incumbent)	Liberal Party	31,516	15.54
Dulnuan Habbiling	Independent	30,336	14.95
Agustin Calya-en (incumbent)	Kilusang Bagong Lipunan	29,740	14.66
Godfrey Dominong	Kilusang Bagong Lipunan	9,977	4.92
Total		202,857	100.00
Total votes		65,250	–
Registered voters/turnout		78,667	82.94
Source: Commission on Elections

==== 2nd district ====
Ifugao's 2nd provincial district consists of the municipalities of Aguinaldo, Alfonso Lista, Banaue and Mayoyao. Four board members are elected from this provincial district.

Eight candidates were included in the ballot.

Candidate	Party	Votes	%
Orlando Addug (incumbent)	Independent	23,242	15.46
Peter Bunnag	Independent	22,719	15.11
Perfecta Dulnuan (incumbent)	Independent	20,672	13.75
Jojo Odan	Liberal Party	20,015	13.31
Samson Atluna	Independent	18,960	12.61
Ricky Dulnuan	Aksyon Demokratiko	18,010	11.98
Greg Ramos	Independent	14,710	9.78
Allan Cutiyog	Independent	12,053	8.01
Total		150,381	100.00
Total votes		47,817	–
Registered voters/turnout		55,761	85.75
Source: Commission on Elections

== Kalinga ==
=== Governor ===
Incumbent Governor Ferdinand Tubban of PDP–Laban ran for a second term.

Tubban was defeated by former Kalinga vice governor James Edduba of Lakas–CMD. Conrado Dieza Jr. (Partido Federal ng Pilipinas) also ran for governor.

Candidate	Party	Votes	%
James Edduba	Lakas–CMD	60,070	46.57
Ferdinand Tubban (incumbent)	PDP–Laban	56,019	43.43
Conrado Dieza Jr.	Partido Federal ng Pilipinas	12,899	10.00
Total		128,988	100.00
Total votes		135,897	–
Registered voters/turnout		154,423	88.00
Lakas gain from PDP–Laban			
Source: Commission on Elections

=== Vice Governor ===
Incumbent Vice Governor Dave Odiem of the Nacionalista Party ran for a second term.

Odiem was defeated by Jocel Baac of Aksyon Demokratiko.

Candidate	Party	Votes	%
Jocel Baac	Aksyon Demokratiko	68,616	55.55
Dave Odiem (incumbent)	Nacionalista Party	54,905	44.45
Total		123,521	100.00
Total votes		135,897	–
Registered voters/turnout		154,423	88.00
Aksyon gain from Nacionalista			
Source: Commission on Elections

=== Provincial Board ===
The Kalinga Provincial Board is composed of 12 board members, eight of whom are elected.

PDP–Laban won four seats, becoming the largest party in the provincial board.

Party	Votes	%	Seats	+/–
PDP–Laban	154,959	35.57	4	+4
Nacionalista Party	94,198	21.62	2	0
Kilusang Bagong Lipunan	59,365	13.63	0	–1
Aksyon Demokratiko	37,511	8.61	1	New
Lakas–CMD	34,681	7.96	0	–1
Liberal Party	29,947	6.87	0	0
Partido para sa Demokratikong Reporma	24,982	5.73	1	New
Total	435,643	100.00	8	0
Total votes	135,897	–		
Registered voters/turnout	154,423	88.00		

==== 1st district ====
Kalinga's 1st provincial district consists of the municipalities of Balbalan, Lubuagan, Pasil, Pinukpuk and Tinglayan. Four board members are elected from this provincial district.

Seven candidates were included in the ballot.

Candidate	Party	Votes	%
Harley Duguiang	Aksyon Demokratiko	35,621	21.44
Roger Saga-oc (incumbent)	PDP–Laban	31,179	18.77
Shirlynne Dasayon (incumbent)	Nacionalista Party	28,292	17.03
Danzel Michael Langkit	Partido para sa Demokratikong Reporma	24,982	15.04
Averille Acuat	Nacionalista Party	23,941	14.41
Samuel Taya-an	Kilusang Bagong Lipunan	18,384	11.07
Raul Poblete	Kilusang Bagong Lipunan	3,733	2.25
Total		166,132	100.00
Total votes		53,091	–
Registered voters/turnout		59,823	88.75
Source: Commission on Elections

==== 2nd district ====
Kalinga's 2nd provincial district consists of the city of Tabuk and the municipalities of Rizal and Tanudan. Four board members are elected from this provincial district.

Eight candidates were included in the ballot.

Candidate	Party	Votes	%
Mark Aldrich Diasen (incumbent)	PDP–Laban	44,204	16.40
Glenn Amla	Nacionalista Party	41,965	15.57
Lester Lee Tarnate (incumbent)	PDP–Laban	40,880	15.17
Antonio Bakilan (incumbent)	PDP–Laban	38,696	14.36
Frederick Pangsiw (incumbent)	Kilusang Bagong Lipunan	37,248	13.82
Eduardo Sarol	Lakas–CMD	34,681	12.87
Christopher Donaal	Liberal Party	29,947	11.11
Luis Fannot Jr.	Aksyon Demokratiko	1,890	0.70
Total		269,511	100.00
Total votes		82,806	–
Registered voters/turnout		94,600	87.53
Source: Commission on Elections

== Mountain Province ==
=== Governor ===
Incumbent Governor Bonifacio Lacwasan of PDP–Laban ran for a second term.

Lacwasan won re-election against Albert Paday-os (Independent).

Candidate	Party	Votes	%
Bonifacio Lacwasan (incumbent)	PDP–Laban	76,104	89.30
Albert Paday-os	Independent	9,121	10.70
Total		85,225	100.00
Total votes		96,471	–
Registered voters/turnout		115,925	83.22
PDP–Laban hold			
Source: Commission on Elections

=== Vice Governor ===
Incumbent Vice Governor Francis Tauli of PDP–Laban ran for a second term.

Tauli won re-election against Bauko mayor Abraham Akliit (Nacionalista Party) and provincial board member Alexandre Claver (Aksyon Demokratiko).

Candidate	Party	Votes	%
Francis Tauli (incumbent)	PDP–Laban	45,143	51.28
Abraham Akilit	Nacionalista Party	40,401	45.89
Alexandre Claver	Aksyon Demokratiko	2,489	2.83
Total		88,033	100.00
Total votes		96,471	–
Registered voters/turnout		115,925	83.22
PDP–Laban hold			
Source: Commission on Elections

=== Provincial Board ===
The Mountain Province Provincial Board is composed of 12 board members, eight of whom are elected.

PDP–Laban won four seats, remaining as the largest party in the provincial board.

Party	Votes	%	Seats	+/–
PDP–Laban	106,411	35.04	4	0
Nacionalista Party	85,779	28.25	2	+2
Reform Party	25,811	8.50	0	New
Laban ng Demokratikong Pilipino	19,066	6.28	1	+1
Independent	66,581	21.93	1	–2
Total	303,648	100.00	8	0
Total votes	96,471	–		
Registered voters/turnout	115,925	83.22		

==== 1st district ====
Mountain Province's 1st provincial district consists of the municipalities of Barlig, Bontoc, Natonin, Paracelis and Sadanga. Four board members are elected from this provincial district.

10 candidates were included in the ballot.

Candidate	Party	Votes	%
Ezra Gomez	Laban ng Demokratikong Pilipino	19,066	13.10
Joshua Fronda (incumbent)	PDP–Laban	18,931	13.01
Federico Onsat (incumbent)	PDP–Laban	18,275	12.55
Cariño Tamang	Nacionalista Party	18,233	12.53
Janice Barillo (incumbent)	PDP–Laban	16,258	11.17
Constancio Miranda	Nacionalista Party	15,173	10.42
Raul Lapon	Reform Party	14,884	10.22
Mathew Fanao	Reform Party	10,927	7.51
Pio Cupasan	Nacionalista Party	9,273	6.37
Cleto Chacapna	Independent	4,545	3.12
Total		145,565	100.00
Total votes		46,433	–
Registered voters/turnout		54,653	84.96
Source: Commission on Elections

==== 2nd district ====
Mountain Province's 2nd provincial district consists of the municipalities of Bauko. Besao, Sabangan, Sagada and Tadian. Four board members are elected from this provincial district.

10 candidates were included in the ballot.

Candidate	Party	Votes	%
Johnson Bantog II	Independent	24,876	15.74
Ricardo Masidong Jr.	Nacionalista Party	21,322	13.49
Henry Bastian Jr. (incumbent)	PDP–Laban	19,159	12.12
Donato Danglose (incumbent)	PDP–Laban	17,407	11.01
Jayne Saong	Independent	16,562	10.48
Salvador Dalang (incumbent)	PDP–Laban	16,381	10.36
Romeo Pagedped	Nacionalista Party	15,925	10.07
Agosto Bugnosen	Independent	13,273	8.40
Fernando Begnaen Jr.	Independent	7,325	4.63
Jeff Dustin Layog	Nacionalista Party	5,853	3.70
Total		158,083	100.00
Total votes		50,038	–
Registered voters/turnout		61,272	81.67
Source: Commission on Elections
