= Solid North Party =

Filipino political party

Solid North Partylist
- — Philippine partylist —
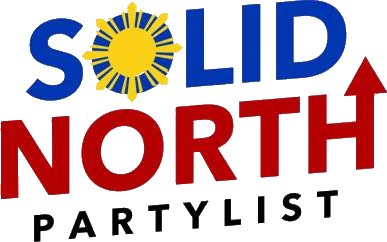
- Full name: Solidarity of Northern Luzon People
- Type: Political party
- Headquarters: Bangued, Abra
- Ideology: Northern Luzon Regionalism
- Colors: Red
- Slogan: Turismo. Trabaho. Progreso. (Filipino) "Tourism. Work. Progress."

Current representation (20th Congress)
- Seats in the House of Representatives: 1 / 3 (Out of 63 party-list seats)
- Representative(s): Ching Bernos

The Solidarity of Northern Luzon People, also known as the Solid North Partylist or Solid North Party, is a political party seeking partylist representation in the House of Representatives of the Philippines.

== History ==
The Solid North Partylist is led by the Bernos political family of Abra. They are also supportive of the administration of President Bongbong Marcos with the organizers of the group seeking endorsement from the chief executive to use the term "Solid North" in their name.

They contested in the 2025 election. Their first nominee is incumbent Abra lone representative Ching Bernos, the wife of Joseph Bernos. The second nominee was Lucia Ortega-Valero of the Ortega family of La Union. In March 7, 2025, a complaint of vote buying was filed against Ching Bernos.

== Electoral performance ==
Election	Votes	%	Party-list Seats
2025	765,322	1.82	1 / 63

== Representatives to Congress ==
Period	Representative
20th Congress; 2025–present	Ching Bernos
Note: A party-list group, can win a maximum of three seats in the House of Representatives.
