= Bersamin =

Bersamin is a surname. Notable people with the surname include:

- Lucas Bersamin (born 1949), Filipino lawyer and jurist
- Takit Bersamin (born 1947), Filipino politician, brother of the above
