= Ching Bernos =

Filipino nurse and politician

Ching Bernos RN
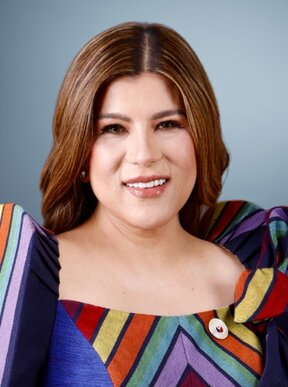
- Official portrait, 2025

Member of the Philippine House of Representatives
- Incumbent
- Assumed office June 30, 2025
- Preceded by: Position Established
- Constituency: Party-list (Solid North)
- In office June 30, 2022 – June 30, 2025
- Preceded by: Joseph Bernos
- Succeeded by: Joseph Bernos
- Constituency: Abra (Lone district)

Mayor of La Paz
- In office June 30, 2016 – June 30, 2022
- Preceded by: Joseph Bernos
- Succeeded by: Joseph Bernos

Vice Mayor of La Paz
- In office June 30, 2007 – June 30, 2016
- Preceded by: Joseph Bernos
- Succeeded by: Benito Nono

Personal details
- Born: Menchie Beronilla; 30 August 1978 (age 48) La Paz, Abra, Philippines
- Party: Solid North (2024–present); Lakas (2008–2012; 2024–present)
- Other political affiliations: Independent (before 2007); KAMPI (2007–2008); Liberal (2012–2015); NUP (2015–2018); Asenso Abrenio (2018–2024); Nacionalista (2021–2024)
- Spouse: Joseph Bernos
- Children: 4
- Occupation: Politician
- Profession: Nurse

Menchie Beronilla Bernos (born Menchie Beronilla, August 30, 1978), also known as Ching Bernos, is a Filipino nurse and politician currently serving as a member of the Philippine House of Representatives representing Solid North since 2025, and Lone District of Abra from 2022 until 2025. She previously served as Mayor of La Paz, Abra, from 2016 to 2022 and as Vice Mayor from 2007 until 2016.

== Political career ==
=== Congressional career (2022-present) ===
In the 2022 election, Bernos ran unopposed for the seat of Abra's lone congressional district, garnering 122,223 votes.

Bernos chose not to seek re-election in 2025 to run instead for representative of Solid North Party as its first nominee.

== Electoral history ==
=== 2007 ===
2007 La Paz, Abra vice mayoralty election
Party	Candidate	Votes	%
KAMPI	Menchie Bernos	4,372	73.15
Lakas	Severo Afos II	1,605	26.85
Total votes		5,977	100.00
KAMPI hold			

=== 2010 ===
2010 La Paz, Abra vice mayoralty epection
Party	Candidate	Votes	%
Lakas–Kampi	Menchie Bernos	5,830	100.00
Valid ballots		5,830	70.84
Invalid or blank votes		2,400	29.16
Total votes		8,230	100.00
Lakas–Kampi hold			

=== 2013 ===
2013 La Paz, Abra vice mayoralty election
Party	Candidate	Votes	%
Liberal	Menchie Bernos	5,802	96.25
Independent	Jacobo Badua	226	3.75
Total votes		6,028	100.00
Liberal hold			

=== 2016 ===
2016 La Paz, Abra mayoralty election
Party	Candidate	Votes	%
NUP	Menchie Bernos	7,828	97.73
Liberal	Severo Afos II	182	2.27
Total votes		8,010	100.00
NUP hold			

=== 2019 ===
2019 La Paz, Abra mayoralty election
Party	Candidate	Votes	%
Asenso	Menchie Bernos	9,119	99.14
PDP–Laban	Severo Afos II	79	0.86
Total votes		9,198	100.00
Asenso hold			

=== 2022 ===
2022 Philippine House of Representatives elections in Abra's Lone District
Party	Candidate	Votes	%
Nacionalista	Menchie Bernos	122,223	100.00
Valid ballots		122,223	66.90
Invalid or blank votes		60,473	33.10
Total votes		182,696	100.00
Nacionalista hold			
