= Abra Provincial Board =

Legislative body of the province of Abra, Philippines

Abra Provincial Board Sangguniang Panlalawigan ng Abra
- 12th Sangguniang Panlalawigan ng Abra

Type
- Type: Unicameral
- Term limits: 3 terms (9 years)

Leadership
- Presiding Officer: Ana Marie A. Bersamin (PFP) since June 30, 2025

Structure
- Seats: 14 board members 1 ex officio presiding officer
- Political groups: PFP (7) NPC (1) Asenso (2) Lakas–CMD (1) Nonpartisan (3)
- Length of term: 3 years
- Authority: Local Government Code of the Philippines

Elections
- Voting system: Plurality-at-large (regular members); Indirect election (ex officio members); Acclamation (sectoral member)
- Last election: May 12, 2025
- Next election: May 15, 2028

Meeting place
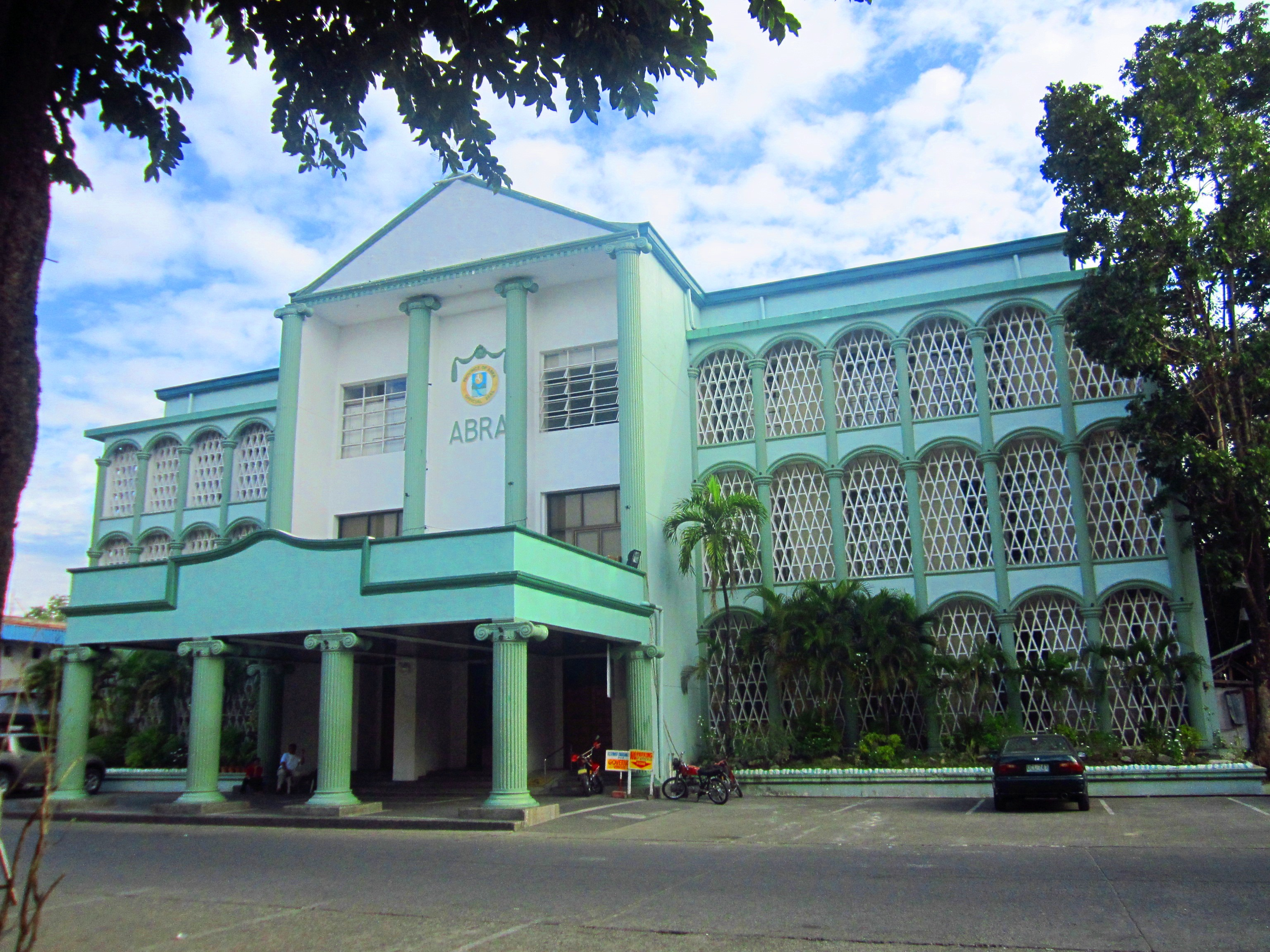

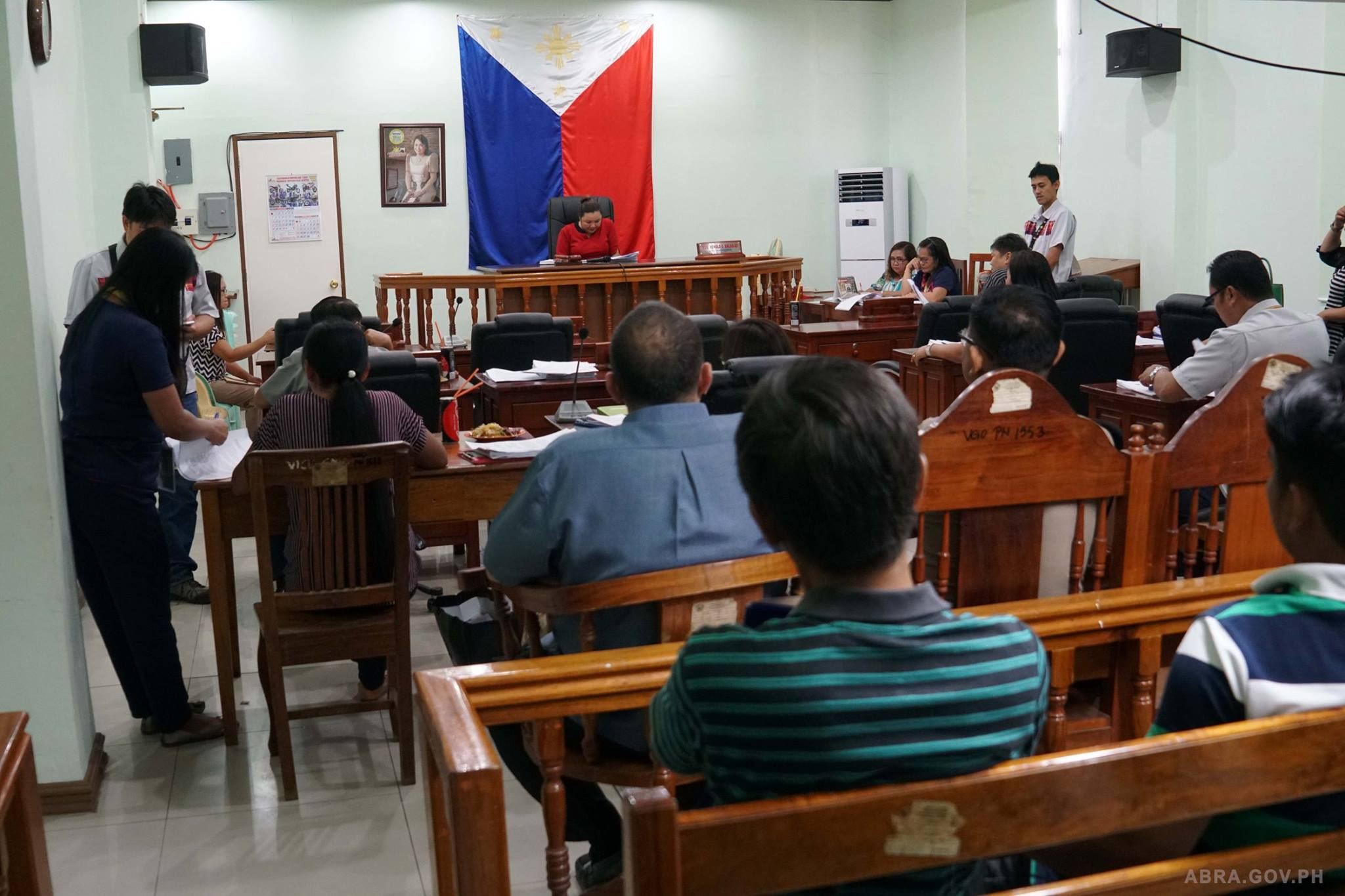
- Abra Provincial Hall, Bangued

The Abra Provincial Board is the Sangguniang Panlalawigan (provincial legislature) of the Philippine province of Abra.

The members are elected via plurality-at-large voting: the province is divided into two districts, each sending four members to the provincial board; the electorate votes for four members, with the four candidates with the highest number of votes being elected. The vice governor is the ex officio presiding officer, and only votes to break ties. The vice governor is elected via the plurality voting system province-wide.

== Seat apportionment ==
Election year	No. of seats per district		Ex officio seats	Reserved seats	Total seats
Election year	1st	2nd	Ex officio seats	Reserved seats	Total seats
2004–2025	4	4	3	1	12
2025–present	4	6	3	1	14

== List of members ==
An additional three ex officio members are the presidents of the provincial chapters of the Association of Barangay Captains, the Councilors' League, the Sangguniang Kabataan provincial president; the municipal and city (if applicable) presidents of the Association of Barangay Captains, Councilor's League and Sangguniang Kabataan, shall elect amongst themselves their provincial presidents which shall be their representatives at the board.

=== Current members ===
These are the members after the 2025 local elections and 2023 barangay and SK elections:

- Vice Governor: Ana Marie A. Bersamin (PFP)

Seat	Board member	Party	Start of term	End of term
1st district	Jane M. Cecilia	PFP	June 30, 2025	June 30, 2028
1st district	Rodolfo S. De la Paz	PFP	June 30, 2019	June 30, 2028
1st district	Rudolfo A. Bernardez III	PFP	June 30, 2025	June 30, 2028
1st district	Bruno O. Domingo Jr.	PFP	June 30, 2025	June 30, 2028
2nd district	Patrocinio B. Abaya Jr.	PFP	June 30, 2019	June 30, 2028
2nd district	Byrone B. Alzate	PFP	June 30, 2025	June 30, 2028
2nd district	Mark Froilan P. Seares	PFP	June 30, 2022	June 30, 2028
2nd district	Luis Jorobots B. Bersamin IV	NPC	June 30, 2025	June 30, 2028
2nd district	Francis Cesar B. Bringas	Asenso	June 30, 2025	June 30, 2028
2nd district	Vladimir Ivan Q. Benwaren	Asenso	June 30, 2025	June 30, 2028
ABC	Fidel B. Belena	Nonpartisan	July 8, 2025	January 1, 2026
PCL	Jason A. Cantil	Lakas	July 8, 2025	June 30, 2028
SK	Cynlai Osorio	Nonpartisan	June 8, 2018	January 1, 2026
IPMR	Romero Daoaten	Nonpartisan	February 5, 2018	

=== Vice governor ===
Election year	Name	Party	Ref.
2001	Jaime Lo	PDSP	
2004	Jaime Lo	NPC	
2007	Victorino Baroña	PDSP	
2010	Rolando Somera	Lakas–Kampi	
2013	Rosario Bersamin	Liberal	
2016	Ronald Balao-as	NUP	
2019	Ronald Balao-as	Asenso	
2022	Joy Bernos	Asenso	
2025	Ana Marie A. Bersamin	PFP	

=== 1st District ===
- Municipalities: Boliney, Bucay, Bucloc, Daguioman, Langiden, Luba, Manabo, Peñarrubia, Pidigan, Pilar, Sallapadan, San Isidro, San Quintin, Tubo, Villaviciosa
- Population (2020): 106,383

Election year	Member (party)	Member (party)	Member (party)	Member (party)	Ref.
2004	Jonathan Beroña (PDSP)	Victor Valera (NPC)	Edgardo Flores (Liberal)	Ruben Paderes (Lakas)	
2007	Jonathan Beroña (PDSP)	Nancy Lupang (Independent)	Edgardo Flores (PDSP)	Elmer Gayao, Sr. (KAMPI)	
2010	Nancy Lupang (Lakas-Kampi)	Floro Fontanilla (Liberal)	Elmer Bides (Liberal)	Elmer Gayao, Sr. (Lakas-Kampi)	
2013	Elmer Bides (Liberal)	Floro Fontanilla (Liberal)	Leonard Andanan (Liberal)	Antonio Dayag (Liberal)	
2016	Elmer Bides (Liberal)	Antonio Dayag (Liberal)	Leonard Andanan (Liberal)	Elmer Gayao, Sr. (NUP)	
2019	Rodolfo de la Paz (Asenso Abrenio)	Antonio Dayag (Asenso Abrenio)	Leonard Andanan (Asenso Abrenio)	Arturo Gayao (Asenso Abrenio)	
2022	Rodolfo de la Paz (Asenso Abrenio)	Victorino Baroña, Jr. (Asenso Abrenio)	Amador Diaz (Asenso Abrenio)	Henrietta Gayao (Asenso Abrenio)	
2025	Jane M. Cecilia (PFP)	Rodolfo S. De la Paz (PFP)	Rudolfo A. Bernardez III (PFP)	Bruno O. Domingo Jr. (PFP)	

=== 2nd District ===
- Municipalities: Bangued, Danglas, Dolores, La Paz, Lacub, Lagangilang, Lagayan, Licuan-Baay, Malibcong, San Juan, Tayum, Tineg
- Population (2020): 144,602

Election year	Member (party)	Member (party)	Member (party)	Ref.
2004	James Bersamin (NPC)	Perfecto Cardenes (NPC)	—N/a	
2004	Victorino Baroña (PDSP)	Ramon Dickson (PDSP)	—N/a	
2007	Ma. Jocelyn Bernos (KAMPI)	Allen Brix Bachiller (KAMPI)	—N/a	
2007	Serafin B. Alzate (KAMPI)	Patrocinio P. Abayao, Jr. (KAMPI)	—N/a	
2010	Maria Elena Jenkins (Independent)	Rosario Bersamin (Liberal)	—N/a	
2010	Allen Brix Bachiller (Lakas-Kampi)	Kathleen Balbin (Lakas-Kampi)	—N/a	
2013	Kathleen Maria Balbin (Liberal)	Ramon Dickson (Liberal)	—N/a	
2013	Allen Brix Bachiller (Nacionalista)	Byrone Alzate (Aksyon)	—N/a	
2016	Kathleen Maria B. Tawantawan (Liberal)	Byrone Alzate (NUP)	—N/a	
2016	Maria Elena A. Jenkins (NUP)	Ana Marie A. Bersamin (Liberal)	—N/a	
2019	Allan Seares (Asenso Abrenio)	Byrone Alzate (Asenso Abrenio)	—N/a	
2019	Maria Elena A. Jenkins (Asenso Abrenio)	Patrocinio Abaya (Asenso Abrenio)	—N/a	
2022	Allan Seares (Asenso Abrenio)	Russell Bragas (Asenso Abrenio)	—N/a	
2022	Maria Elena A. Jenkins (Asenso Abrenio)	Patrocinio Abaya (Asenso Abrenio)	—N/a	
2025	Patrocino B. Abaya Jr. (PFP)	Byrone B. Alzate (PFP)	Mark Froilan P. Seares (PFP)	
2025	Luis Jorobots B. Bersamin IV (NPC)	Francis Cesar B. Bringas (Asenso Abrenio)	Vladimir Ivan Q. Benwaren (Asenso Abrenio)	
