= Lagayan =

Municipality in Abra, Philippines

- Municipality
- Municipality of Lagayan
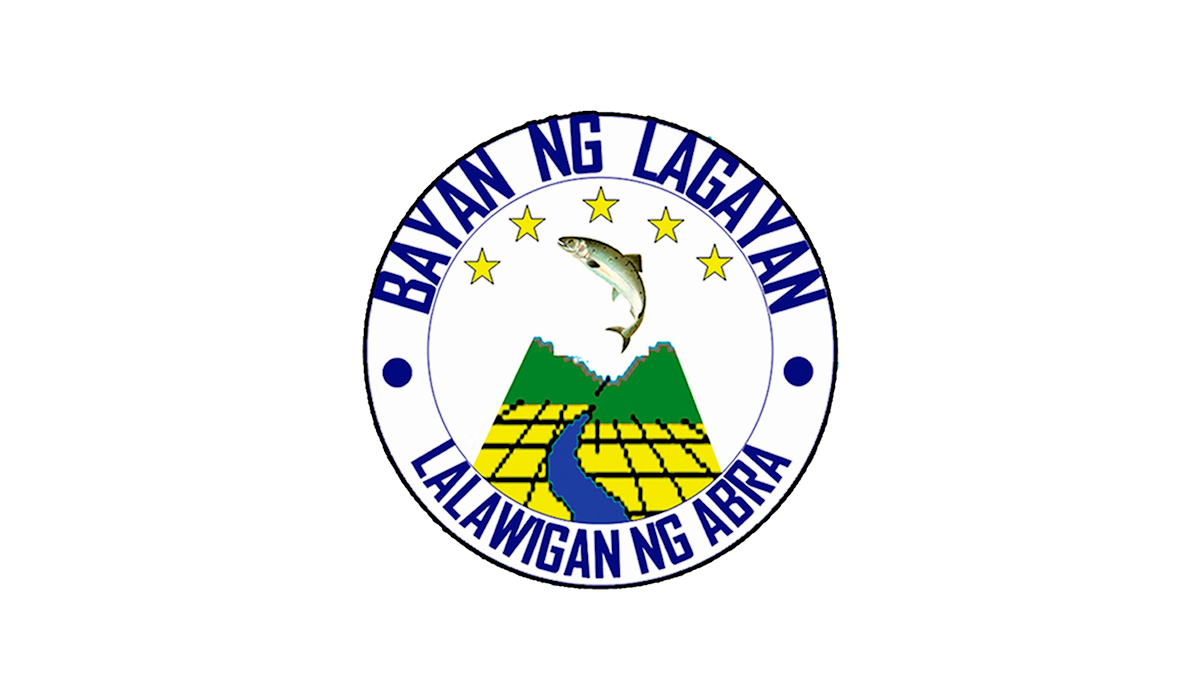
- Flag Seal

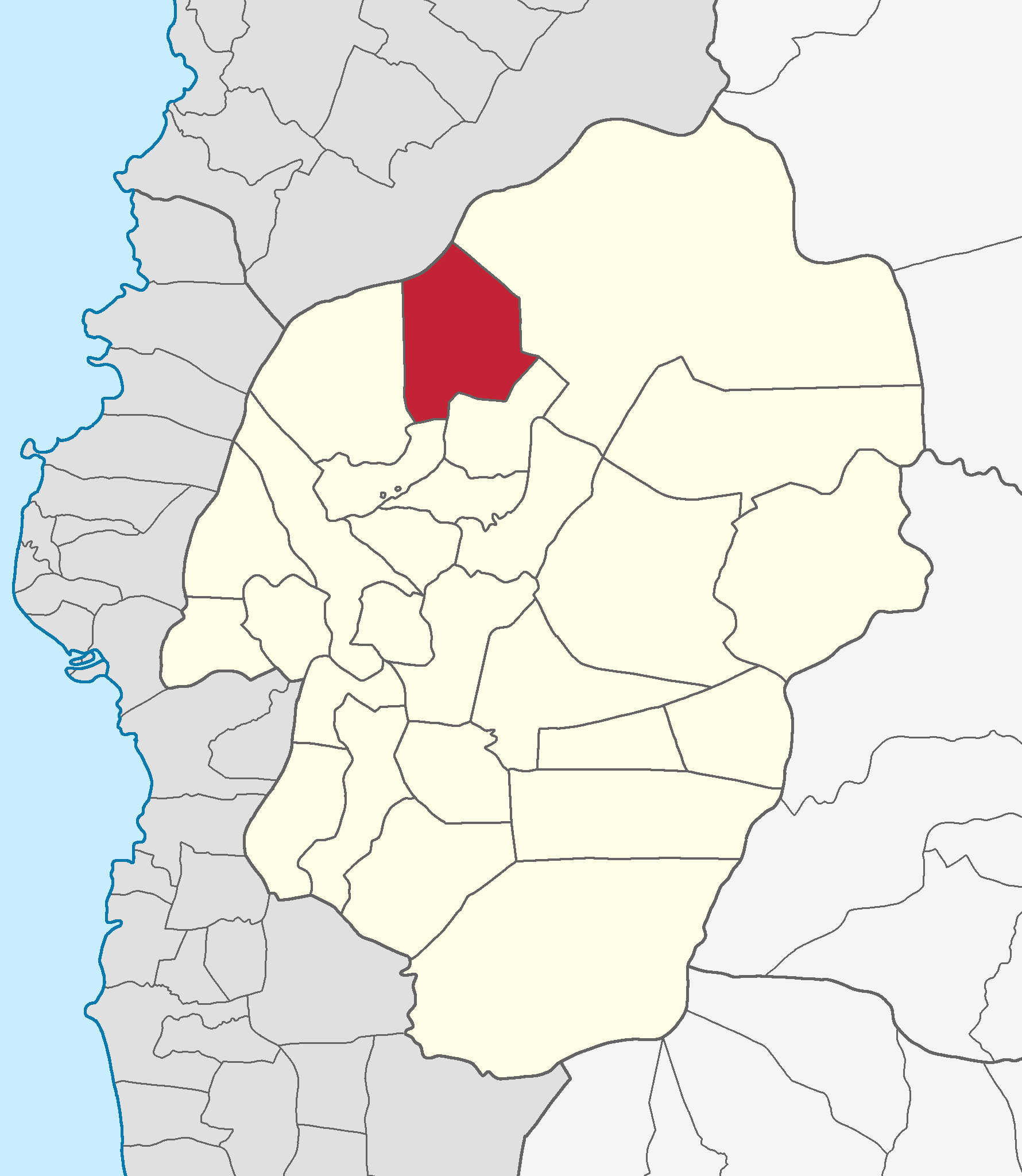
- Map of Abra with Lagayan highlighted
- Interactive map of Lagayan
- Location within the Philippines
- Coordinates: 17°43′N 120°43′E
- Country: Philippines
- Region: Cordillera Administrative Region
- Province: Abra
- District: Lone district
- Barangays: 5 (see Barangays)

Government
  - Type: Sangguniang Bayan
  - Mayor: Edmarc L. Crisologo
  - Vice Mayor: Apolinar B. Molina
  - Representative: Joseph Santo Niño B. Bernos
  - Municipal Council: Members: Shalee Cheng L. Layao; Rexor Jay A. Molina; Jerryvine L. Alejandro; Romblomio D. Pariñas Jr.; Maria Lucille L. Montero; Wilfred M. Bilong Sr.; Ailyn S. Parado; Dominador M. Cardenas Jr.
  - Electorate: 3,510 voters (2025)

Area
  - Total: 215.97 km^{2} (83.39 sq mi)
- Elevation: 203 m (666 ft)
- Highest elevation: 742 m (2,434 ft)
- Lowest elevation: 67 m (220 ft)

Population (2024 census)
  - Total: 5,154
  - Density: 23.86/km^{2} (61.81/sq mi)
  - Households: 1,085

Economy
  - Income class: 4th municipal income class
  - Poverty incidence: 10.44% (2023)
  - Revenue: ₱ 145.6 million (2024)
  - Assets: ₱ 458.7 million (2024)
  - Expenditure: ₱ 145.1 million (2024)
  - Liabilities: ₱ 64.35 million (2024)

Service provider
  - Electricity: Abra Electric Cooperative (ABRECO)
- Time zone: UTC+8 (PST)
- ZIP code: 2824
- PSGC: 1400111000
- IDD : area code: +63 (0)74
- Native languages: Itneg, Ilocano, Filipino

Lagayan, officially the Municipality of Lagayan (Ilocano: Ili ti Lagayan; Adasen: Ili u Lagayan; Filipino: Bayan ng Lagayan), is a municipality in the province of Abra, Philippines. According to the 2024 census, it has a population of 5,154 people.

== History ==
On November 2, 1987, members of the New People's Army, a communist insurgency group, raided the municipal hall and burned down former mayor Solomon Lalugan's house, with his two sons taken hostage.

== Geography ==
According to the Philippine Statistics Authority, the municipality has a land area of 215.97 square kilometres (83.39 sq mi) constituting 5.19% of the 4,165.25-square-kilometre- (1,608.21 sq mi) total area of Abra. It is located at 17°43′N 120°43′E.

Lagayan is situated 19.04 kilometres (11.83 mi) from the provincial capital Bangued, and 424.89 kilometres (264.01 mi) from the country's capital city of Manila.

=== Barangays ===
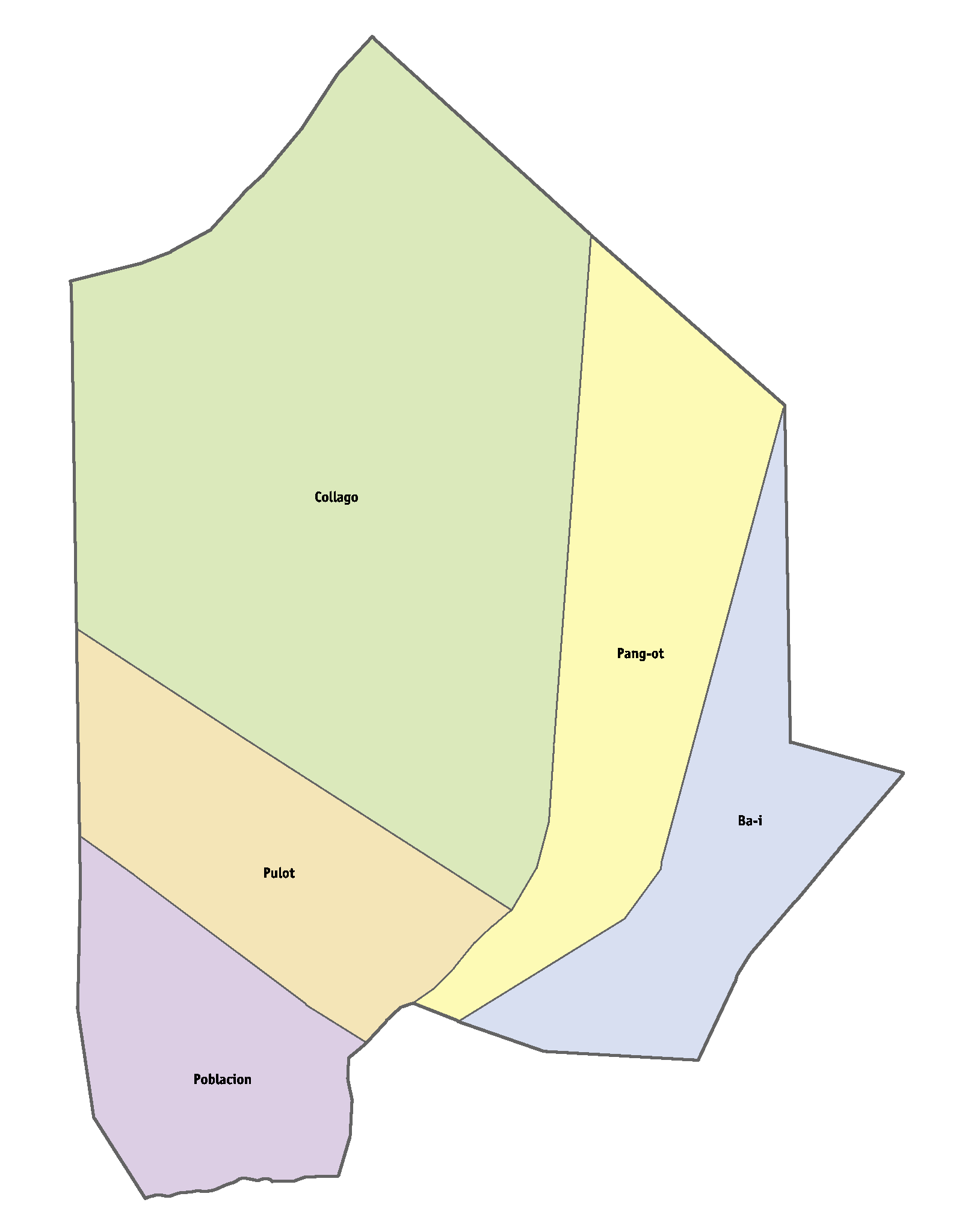
Political map of Lagayan

Lagayan is politically subdivided into 5 barangays. Each barangay consists of puroks and some have sitios.

PSGC	Barangay	Population			±% p.a.	
		2024		2010		
140111002	Ba-i	14.2%	731	851	▾	−1.04%
140111004	Collago	20.5%	1,058	1,049	▴	0.06%
140111005	Pang-ot	6.3%	325	366	▾	−0.82%
140111006	Poblacion	26.1%	1,343	1,236	▴	0.57%
140111007	Pulot	20.0%	1,031	975	▴	0.39%
	Total		5,154	4,488	▴	0.96%

=== Climate ===
Climate data for Lagayan, Abra
Month	Jan	Feb	Mar	Apr	May	Jun	Jul	Aug	Sep	Oct	Nov	Dec	Year
Mean daily maximum °C (°F)	27 (81)	28 (82)	30 (86)	32 (90)	31 (88)	31 (88)	30 (86)	30 (86)	20 (68)	29 (84)	28 (82)	27 (81)	29 (84)
Mean daily minimum °C (°F)	19 (66)	19 (66)	20 (68)	22 (72)	24 (75)	24 (75)	24 (75)	24 (75)	24 (75)	22 (72)	21 (70)	20 (68)	22 (71)
Average precipitation mm (inches)	24 (0.9)	26 (1.0)	25 (1.0)	43 (1.7)	159 (6.3)	180 (7.1)	204 (8.0)	207 (8.1)	183 (7.2)	185 (7.3)	91 (3.6)	67 (2.6)	1,394 (54.8)
Average rainy days	8.2	8.7	10.1	13.7	22.3	24.3	25.3	23.5	22.2	16.4	14.1	12.7	201.5
Source: Meteoblue

== Demographics ==
Population census of Lagayan
Year	Pop.	±% p.a.
1918	1,713	—
1939	2,211	+1.22%
1948	2,222	+0.06%
1960	2,750	+1.79%
1970	3,182	+1.47%
1975	3,372	+1.17%
1980	3,827	+2.56%
1990	3,771	−0.15%
1995	3,412	−1.86%
2000	3,894	+2.87%
2007	4,134	+0.83%
2010	4,477	+2.94%
2015	4,499	+0.09%
2020	4,488	−0.05%
2024	5,154	+3.38%
Source: Philippine Statistics Authority

In the 2024 census, Lagayan had a population of 5,154 people. The population density was 24 inhabitants per square kilometre (62/sq mi).

== Economy ==
Poverty incidence of Lagayan (%)

Source: Philippine Statistics Authority

The municipality is centered on agriculture, microenterprises, and local infrastructure projects. Lagayan focuses on the cultivation of rice, corn, and local high-value crops. Lagayan has a DTI Negosyo Center that provides access to microentrepreneurs. Lagayan funded road networks connecting major barangays like Pulot and Poblacion.

== Government ==
=== Local government ===
Lagayan, belonging to the lone congressional district of the province of Abra, is governed by a mayor designated as its local chief executive and by a municipal council as its legislative body in accordance with the Local Government Code. The mayor, vice mayor, and the councillors are elected directly by the people through an election, which is held every three years.

=== Elected officials ===
Members of the Municipal Council (2025–2028)
Position	Name
Congressman	Joseph Santo Niño B. Bernos
Mayor	Edmarc L. Crisologo
Vice-Mayor	Apolinar B. Molina
Councilors	Romblomio D. Pariñas, Jr.
Councilors	Rexor Jay A. Molina
Councilors	Ailyn S. Parado
Councilors	Jerryvine L. Alejandro
Councilors	Shalee Cheng L. Layao
Councilors	Maria Lucille L. Montero
Councilors	Wilfred M. Bilong, Sr.
Councilors	Dominador M. Cardenas, Jr.

== Education ==
The Lagayan Schools District Office governs all educational institutions within the municipality. It oversees the management and operations of all private and public schools, from primary to secondary schools.

=== Primary and elementary schools ===
- Baybayatin Primary School
- Collago Elementary School
- Kiwas Primary School
- Lagayan Central School
- Lukgay Primary School
- Pang-ot Primary School
- Pulot Elementary School

=== Secondary schools ===
- Ba-i Integrated School
- Pulot National High School
