= Joseph Bernos =

Filipino politician

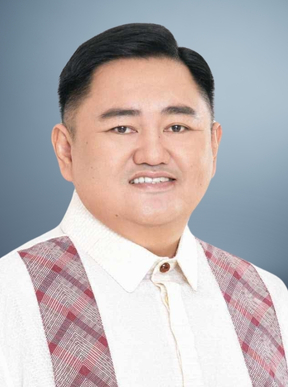
- Official portrait, 2025

Member of the Philippine House of Representatives from Abra's Lone district
- Incumbent
- Assumed office June 30, 2025
- Preceded by: Menchie Bernos
- In office June 30, 2016 – June 30, 2022
- Preceded by: Joy Bernos
- Succeeded by: Menchie Bernos

Mayor of La Paz
- In office June 30, 2022 – June 30, 2025
- Preceded by: Menchie Bernos
- Succeeded by: Danielle Belyne Bernos
- In office January 13, 2006 – June 30, 2016
- Vice Mayor: Menchie Bernos
- Preceded by: Marc Ysrael Bernos
- Succeeded by: Menchie Bernos

Vice Mayor of La Paz
- In office June 30, 2004 – January 13, 2006
- Mayor: Marc Ysrael Bernos

Member of the La Paz Municipal Council
- In office June 30, 2001 – June 30, 2004

Personal details
- Born: Joseph Sto. Niño Blando Bernos
- Party: NUP (2026–present)
- Other political affiliations: Lakas (2004–2012; 2024–2026); Nacionalista (2021–2024); PDP-Laban (2016–2021); Asenso Abrenio (2015–2024); Liberal (2012–2016); KAMPI (2007–2008); PDSP (2001–2004)
- Spouse: Menchie Beronilla
- Children: 2

Joseph Sto. Niño "JB" Blando Bernos is a Filipino politician. He is a member of the Philippine House of Representatives representing the Lone District of Abra since 2025, previously holding the seat from 2016 to 2022. From 2006 to 2016 and again from 2022 to 2025, he was the mayor of La Paz, Abra.

== Early life and career ==
Joseph Bernos is the son of former Governor of Abra Andres Bernos. His first political experience was as a Sangguniang Kabataan federation president. He served as a councilor of La Paz. He then served as the vice mayor. He was eventually elected as the mayor of La Paz.

== Mayor of La Paz, Abra (2006–2016) ==
In January 2006, he was sworn in after the murder of Mayor Marc Ysrael Bernos. Department of the Interior and Local Government then-Secretary Angelo Reyes ordered the tightening of security. In December 2006, President Gloria Macapagal Arroyo berated Bernos and other mayors during a meeting because of the vulnerability of Abra after the killing of Representative Luis Bersamin. In a report published in 2007, Bernos was linked to four partisan armed groups members. Bernos condemned the New People's Army killing of a councilor bet.

== House of Representatives (2016–2022, 2025–present) ==
Bernos ran for Abra's at-large congressional district in the 2016 Philippine House of Representatives elections under the Liberal Party. He gained 63,033 votes, winning against three other candidates. In the 2019 Philippine House of Representatives elections, he ran for the lone district of Abra under the Asenso Party. He won with 115,081 votes against two other candidates. On March 24, 2021, Bernos announced that he had tested positive for COVID-19. Bernos was reelected in 2025 under Lakas-CMD.

== Mayor of La Paz, Abra (2022–2025) ==
In the 2022 Philippine local elections, he ran for the Mayor of Abra under the Nacionalista Party. He won unopposed with 10,490 votes. During his term, he was elected as the president of the League of Municipalities of the Philippines.

== Controversies ==
DZRH provincial news correspondent Romeo Gonzales filed a complaint with the Philippine National Police in Baguio City on April 23,2025 alleging that La Paz, Abra Mayor Joseph “JB” Bernos—who is also a congressional candidate—threatened him to follow his report on a shooting incident in Abra for DZRH News. On April 21, 2025 in Barangay Budac, Tayum, Abra, Gonzales covered and reported on a violent confrontation between armed police personnel and a barangay official. His report was subsequently disseminated across DZRH’s multimedia platforms.

The Kapisanan ng mga Brodkaster ng Pilipinas issued a strong condemnation of the threats allegedly made by La Paz, Abra Mayor Joseph "JB" Bernos against Romeo Gonzales, a provincial correspondent for DZRH radio station.

House of Representatives of the Philippines
Preceded by Menchie Bernos	Representative, Lone District of Abra; 2025–present 2016–2022	Incumbent
Preceded by Maria Jocelyn Bernos	Representative, Lone District of Abra; 2025–present 2016–2022	Succeeded by Menchie Bernos
Political offices
Preceded by Marc Ysrael Bernos	Mayor of La Paz; 2007–2016; 2022–2025	Succeeded by Menchie Bernos
Preceded by Menchie Bernos	Mayor of La Paz; 2007–2016; 2022–2025	Succeeded by Danielle Belyne Bernos
