= Takit Bersamin =

Filipino politician

Governor of Abra
- Incumbent
- Assumed office June 30, 2025
- Vice Governor: Ana Marie A. Bersamin
- Preceded by: Russel A. Bragas (acting); Dominic Valera
- In office June 30, 2007 – June 30, 2016
- Vice Governor: Victorino Baroña (2007–2010); Rolando Somera (2010–2013); Rosario "Chari" A. Bersamin (2013–2016)
- Preceded by: Vicente Ysidro P. Valera
- Succeeded by: Joy Bernos

Personal details
- Born: March 13, 1947 (age 79) Manila, Philippines
- Party: PFP (2024–present)
- Other political affiliations: Reporma (2021–2024); Liberal (2012–2021); Lakas-CMD (2008–2012); KAMPI (2007–2008)
- Spouse: Ruby Mamsaang Bersamin
- Relations: Lucas Bersamin (brother)
- Occupation: Politician

Eustaquio "Takit" Purugganan Bersamin (born March 13, 1947) is a Filipino politician who is the governor from Abra, Philippines since 2025. He won the May 12, 2025, local elections as the candidate of the Partido Federal ng Pilipinas (PFP). Bersamin previously served as governor from 2007 to 2016 and is scheduled to return to office on June 30, 2025. He is the brother of Lucas P. Bersamin, who serves as Executive Secretary of the Philippines and is former Chief Justice of the Supreme Court of the Philippines.

Bersamin was born into a political family in Abra. His father, Dr. Luis F. Bersamin, Sr., served in the Philippine Medical Corps during World War II and survived the Bataan Death March. After the war, he was appointed governor of Abra during the post-liberation period. Bersamin's mother, Rosario Purruganan, was a pharmacist and the daughter of Eustaquio Purruganan, who also served as governor of Abra and representative during the American colonial period.

== Peace and order initiatives ==
Abra, a province with a history of election-related incidents, saw a decline in violent incidents during local elections under Bersamin's administration.

== Economic and livelihood programs ==
Bersamin supported local economic initiatives under the national "One Town, One Product" (OTOP) program. His administration promoted bamboo-based industries and the revival of traditional natural dye production. These efforts aligned with cultural and livelihood development goals in the province.

== Health and social services ==
In 2013, the Abra Provincial Hospital was inaugurated in Barangay Calaba, Bangued, during Bersamin's term as governor. The ₱200 million facility included a ₱180 million loan from Land Bank and ₱20 million from provincial funds. The 170-bed hospital was equipped with updated medical technologies and supported by the Department of Health and a community-led “Adopt-a-Room” program.

== Electoral history ==
Electoral history of Takit Bersamin
Year	Office	Party	Votes received				Result
Year	Office	Party	Total	%	P.	Swing	Result
2007	Governor of Abra	KAMPI	59,557	60.81%	1st	—N/a	Won
2010	Governor of Abra	Lakas	89,985	95.57%	1st	+34.76	Won
2013	Governor of Abra	Liberal	93,776	80.34%	1st	-15.23	Won
2025	Governor of Abra	PFP	133,176	79.30%	1st	-1.04	Won

Political offices
Preceded by Russel A. Bragas (Acting)	Governor of Abra; 2025–present 2007–2016	Incumbent
Preceded by Vicente Ysidro P. Valera	Governor of Abra; 2025–present 2007–2016	Succeeded by Joy Bernos
