= Joy Bernos =

Filipino politician

The Honorable Maria Jocelyn Bernos
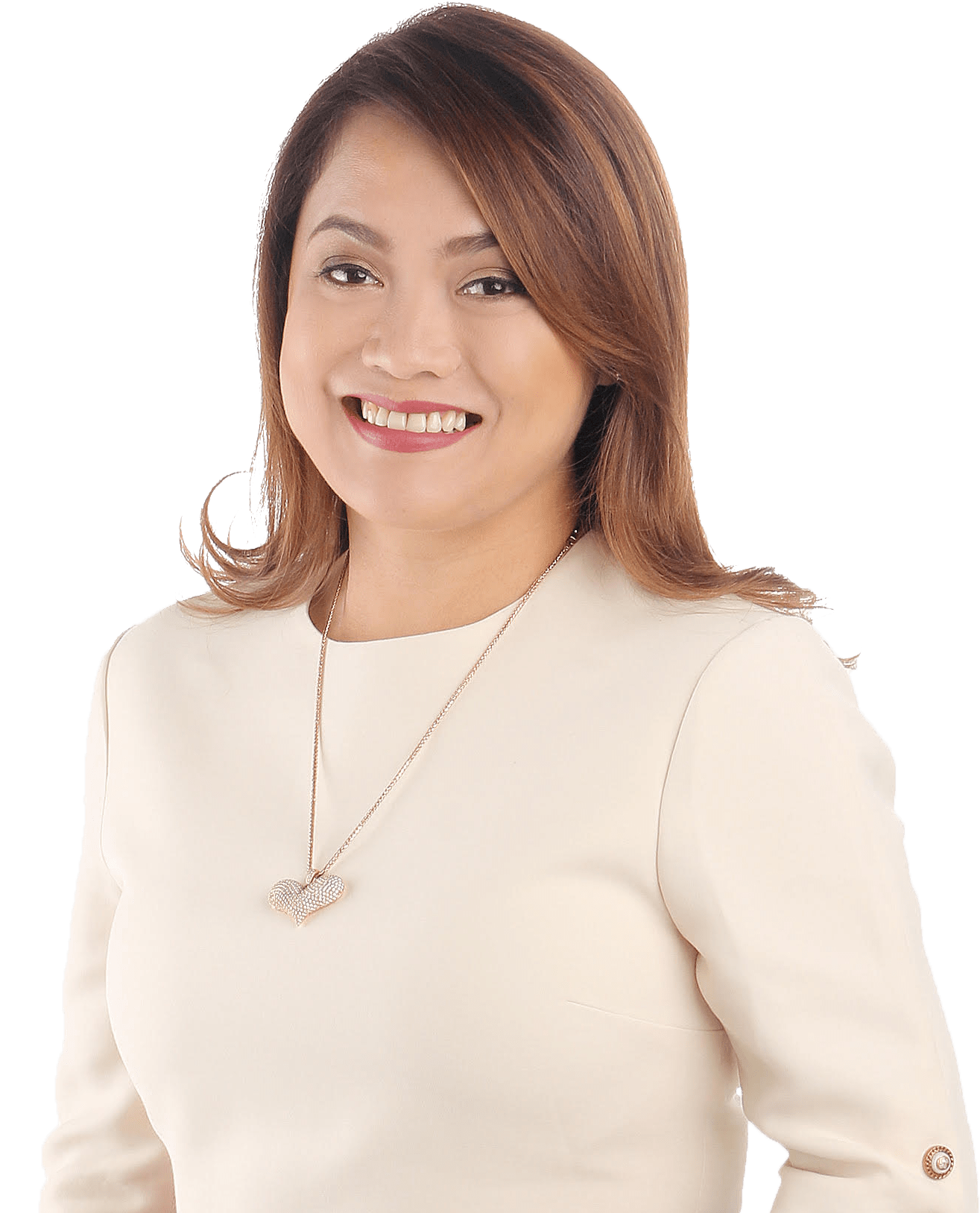

Vice Governor of Abra
- In office June 30, 2022 – September 23, 2024 (Note: Suspended from August 12, 2024 to September 2, 2024 and from September 23, 2024 to June 30, 2025)
- Governor: Dominic Valera
- Preceded by: Ronald S. Balao-as
- Succeeded by: Russell Bragas (Note: acting from August 12, 2024 to September 2, 2024 and since September 23, 2024)

Governor of Abra
- In office June 30, 2016 – June 30, 2022
- Vice Governor: Ronald S. Balao-as
- Preceded by: Takit Bersamin
- Succeeded by: Dominic Valera

Member of the Philippine House of Representatives of Lone District of Abra
- In office June 30, 2010 – June 30, 2016
- Preceded by: Cecilia Seares-Luna
- Succeeded by: Joseph Sto. Niño B. Bernos

Personal details
- Born: January 9, 1977 (age 49) Bangued, Abra, Philippines
- Party: NUP (2015–present); Asenso Abrenio (local party; 2010–present)
- Other political affiliations: Liberal (2012–2015); PDSP (2009–2012)
- Spouse: Marc Ysrael Bernos (deceased)
- Children: 3
- Parent: Dominic Valera (father)

Maria Jocelyn "Joy" Valera Bernos (born January 9, 1977) is a Filipina politician who served as the vice governor of Abra before her final suspension on September 23, 2024. She was previously the governor of the province from 2016 to 2022, a member of the House of Representatives representing Abra's at-large congressional district from 2010 to 2016, and a member of the Abra Provincial Board from 2007 to 2010.

She stood for the 2016 gubernatorial election under the banner of the NUP, however, since 2019, she has stood as a member of Asenso Abrenio.

On August 12, 2024, she was ordered suspended by President Bongbong Marcos for 18 months following an investigation into her unilaterally ordering the lockdown of a hospital in Bangued during the COVID-19 pandemic in 2020, when she was governor. However, her suspension was halted on technical grounds by a court in Abra, which issued a 20-day temporary restraining order against the decision on September 2. The TRO expired on September 23, rendering the suspension final and executory.

Bernos ran again for vice governor in 2025 but lost to Anne Bersamin.

== Notes ==
House of Representatives of the Philippines
Preceded by Cecilia Seares-Luna	Representative, Lone District of Abra; 2010–2016	Succeeded by Joseph Sto. Niño B. Bernos
Political offices
Preceded by Eustaquio P. Bersamin	Governor of Abra; 2016–2022	Succeeded by Dominic Valera
Preceded by Ronald Balao-as	Vice-Governor of Abra; 2022–	Incumbent
