= Malibcong =

Municipality in Abra, Philippines

- Municipality
- Municipality of Malibcong
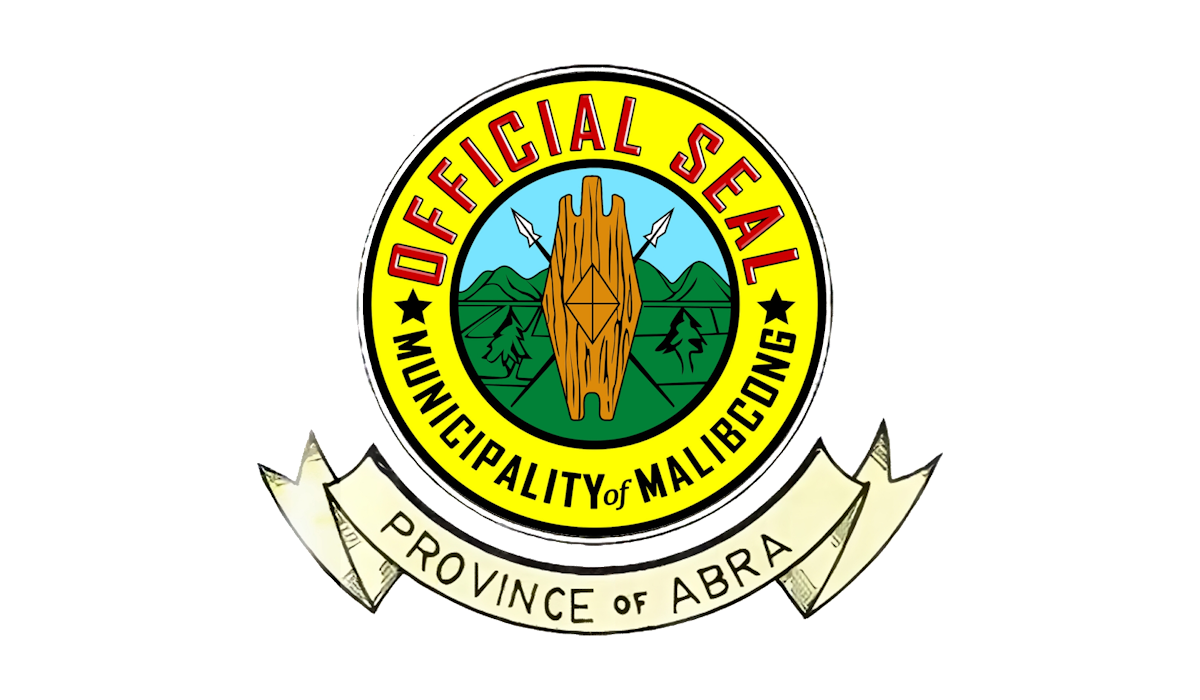
- Flag

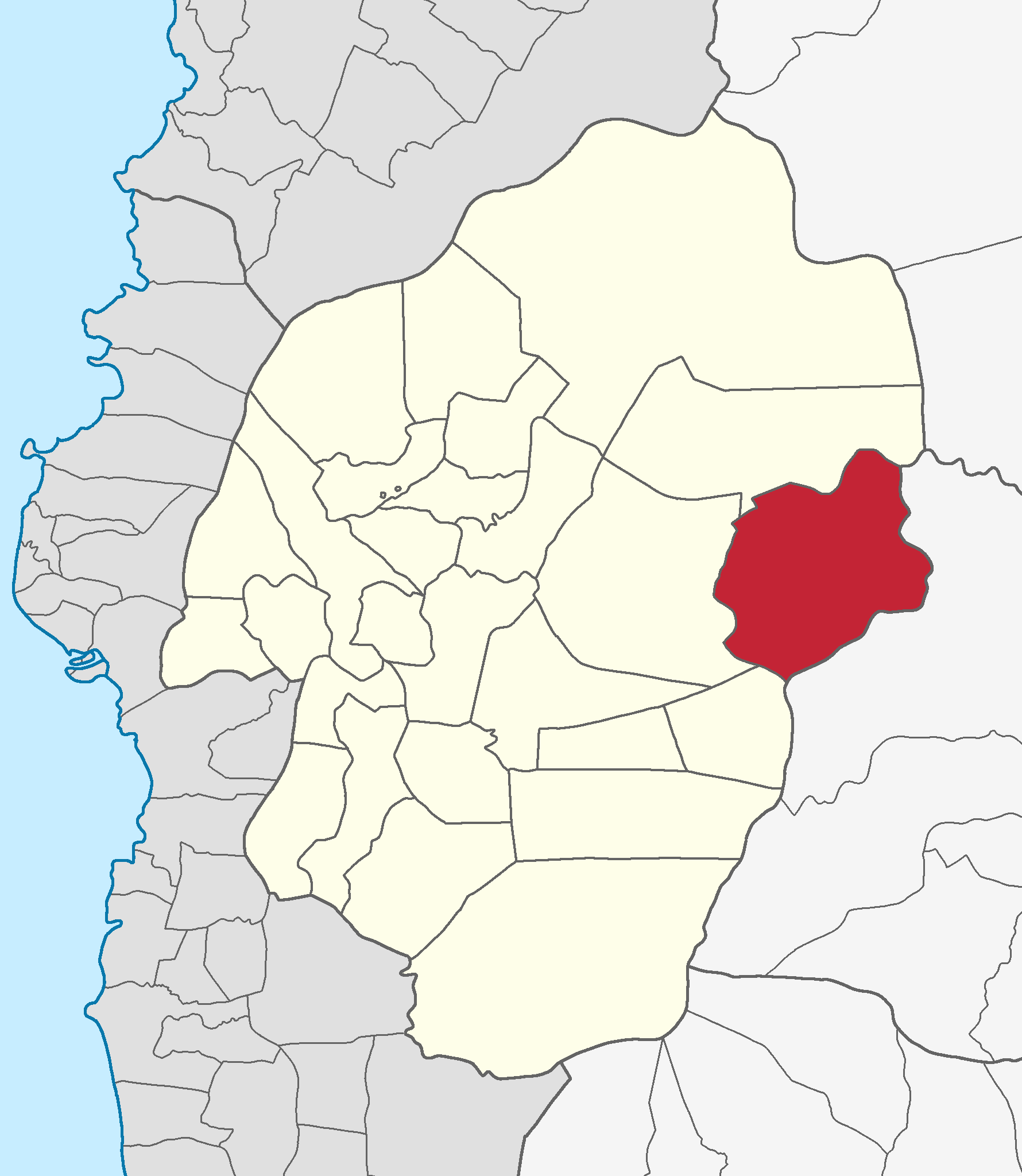
- Map of Abra with Malibcong highlighted
- Interactive map of Malibcong
- Location within the Philippines
- Coordinates: 17°34′N 120°59′E
- Country: Philippines
- Region: Cordillera Administrative Region
- Province: Abra
- District: Lone district
- Barangays: 12 (see Barangays)

Government
  - Type: Sangguniang Bayan
  - Mayor: Romando B. Bacuyag
  - Vice Mayor: Leon A. Tadeo Jr.
  - Representative: Joseph Santo Niño B. Bernos
  - Municipal Council: Members: Joey B. Bacuyag; Raymund D. Elveña; Geronimo B. Molina; Eric Peter B. Paganao; Emerita C. Lingayo; Carmelo B. Molina; Alberto David A. Alunday; Regender B. Mabanag
  - Electorate: 3,113 voters (2025)

Area
  - Total: 283.17 km^{2} (109.33 sq mi)
- Elevation: 1,012 m (3,320 ft)
- Highest elevation: 1,637 m (5,371 ft)
- Lowest elevation: 589 m (1,932 ft)

Population (2024 census)
  - Total: 4,167
  - Density: 14.72/km^{2} (38.11/sq mi)
  - Households: 835

Economy
  - Income class: 3rd municipal income class
  - Poverty incidence: 13.81% (2023)
  - Revenue: ₱ 45.97 million (2012), 48.91 million (2013), 55.09 million (2014), 58.84 million (2015), 77.95 million (2016), 50.78 million (2011)
  - Assets: ₱ 15.77 million (2012), 20.14 million (2013), 23.51 million (2014), 44.95 million (2015), 96.42 million (2016), 10.27 million (2011)
  - Expenditure: ₱ 41.96 million (2012), 38.88 million (2013), 38.99 million (2014), 43.02 million (2015), 48.5 million (2016), 45.86 million (2011)
  - Liabilities: ₱ 6.451 million (2012), 11.99 million (2013), 12.11 million (2014), 26.66 million (2015), 38.8 million (2016), 3.052 million (2011)

Service provider
  - Electricity: Abra Electric Cooperative (ABRECO)
- Time zone: UTC+8 (PST)
- ZIP code: 2820
- PSGC: 1400115000
- IDD : area code: +63 (0)74
- Native languages: Itneg; Ilocano; Tagalog

Malibcong, officially the Municipality of Malibcong (Ilocano: Ili ti Malibcong; Tagalog: Bayan ng Malibcong), is a municipality in the province of Abra, Philippines. According to the 2024 census, it has a population of 4,167 people.

== Geography ==
The Municipality of Malibcong is located at 17°34′N 120°59′E. According to the Philippine Statistics Authority, the municipality has a land area of 283.17 square kilometres (109.33 sq mi) constituting 6.80% of the 4,165.25-square-kilometre- (1,608.21 sq mi) total area of Abra.

Malibcong is situated 75.75 kilometres (47.07 mi) from the provincial capital Bangued, and 481.60 kilometres (299.25 mi) from the country's capital city of Manila.

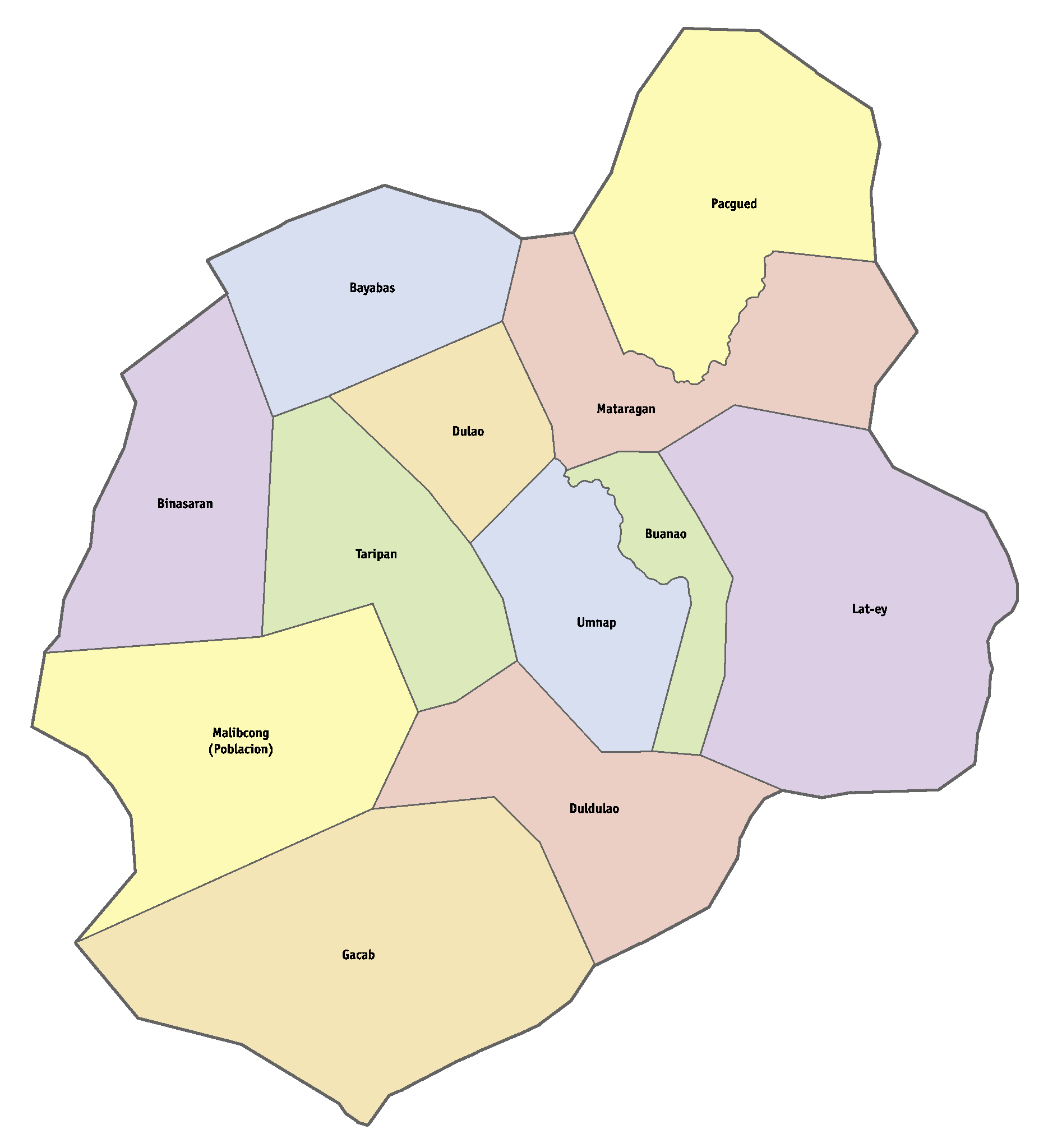
Political map of Malibcong

=== Barangays ===
Malibcong is politically subdivided into 12 barangays. Each barangay consists of puroks and some have sitios.

PSGC	Barangay	Population			±% p.a.	
		2024		2010		
140115001	Bayabas	5.3%	222	218	▴	0.13%
140115002	Binasaran	4.2%	177	191	▾	−0.53%
140115003	Buanao	8.3%	345	345	Steady	0.00%
140115004	Dulao	6.0%	252	223	▴	0.85%
140115005	Duldulao	8.8%	368	362	▴	0.11%
140115006	Gacab	12.1%	506	433	▴	1.09%
140115007	Lat-ey	5.3%	220	203	▴	0.56%
140115008	Malibcong (Poblacion)	13.7%	571	567	▴	0.05%
140115009	Mataragan	14.0%	585	526	▴	0.74%
140115010	Pacgued	6.9%	288	229	▴	1.60%
140115011	Taripan	5.0%	210	232	▾	−0.69%
140115012	Umnap	6.8%	283	278	▴	0.12%
	Total		4,167	4,027	▴	0.24%

=== Climate ===
Climate data for Malibcong, Abra
Month	Jan	Feb	Mar	Apr	May	Jun	Jul	Aug	Sep	Oct	Nov	Dec	Year
Mean daily maximum °C (°F)	23 (73)	24 (75)	26 (79)	28 (82)	27 (81)	27 (81)	26 (79)	25 (77)	25 (77)	25 (77)	24 (75)	23 (73)	25 (77)
Mean daily minimum °C (°F)	15 (59)	15 (59)	16 (61)	18 (64)	20 (68)	20 (68)	20 (68)	20 (68)	19 (66)	18 (64)	17 (63)	16 (61)	18 (64)
Average precipitation mm (inches)	24 (0.9)	26 (1.0)	25 (1.0)	43 (1.7)	159 (6.3)	180 (7.1)	204 (8.0)	207 (8.1)	183 (7.2)	185 (7.3)	91 (3.6)	67 (2.6)	1,394 (54.8)
Average rainy days	8.2	8.7	10.1	13.7	22.3	24.3	25.3	23.5	22.2	16.4	14.1	12.7	201.5
Source: Meteoblue

== Demographics ==
Population census of Malibcong
Year	Pop.	±% p.a.
1939	1,648	—
1948	1,676	+0.19%
1960	2,163	+2.15%
1970	3,158	+3.85%
1975	2,817	−2.27%
1980	3,108	+1.98%
1990	3,494	+1.18%
1995	3,870	+1.93%
2000	3,806	−0.36%
2007	3,354	−1.73%
2010	3,807	+4.72%
2015	3,428	−1.98%
2020	4,027	+3.45%
2024	4,167	+0.82%
Source: Philippine Statistics Authority

In the 2024 census, Malibcong had a population of 4,167 people. The population density was 15 inhabitants per square kilometre (39/sq mi).

The Itneg tribe can be found in Malibcong and they speak a sub-dialect of Banao Itneg language, and Ilocano. There are three dialects in Malibcong: Banao, Gubang and Mabaka.

== Economy ==
Poverty incidence of Malibcong (%)

Source: Philippine Statistics Authority

Malibcong's economy heavily relies on agriculture, local trade, and rural development initiatives. The primary economic aspects of Malibcong are rice and vegetable farming. Malibcong's farming operations involves raising carabaos, cattle, swine, and poultry. Another economic aspects of Malibcong include carpentry, woodwork, and traditional metalworks.

== Government ==
=== Local government ===
Malibcong, belonging to the lone congressional district of the province of Abra, is governed by a mayor designated as its local chief executive and by a municipal council as its legislative body in accordance with the Local Government Code. The mayor, vice mayor, and the councilors are elected directly by the people through an election which is being held every three years.

=== Elected officials ===
Members of the Municipal Council (2025–2028)
Position	Name
Congressman	Joseph Santo Niño B. Bernos
Mayor	Romando B. Bacuyag
Vice-Mayor	Leon A. Tadeo, Jr.
Councilors	Raymund D. Elveña
Councilors	Geronimo B. Molina
Councilors	Eric Peter B. Paganao
Councilors	Emerita C. Lingayo
Councilors	Regender B. Mabanag
Councilors	Joey B. Bacuyag
Councilors	Carmelo B. Molina
Councilors	Alberto David A. Alunday

== Education ==
The Malibcong Schools District Office governs all educational institutions within the municipality. It oversees the management and operations of all private and public, from primary to secondary schools.

=== Primary and elementary schools ===
- Bangilo Elementary School
- Bayabas Elementary School
- Binasaran Primary School
- Dulao Elementary School
- Liwang Elementary School
- Malibcong Central School
- Mataragan Elementary School
- Taripan Elementary School
- Gacab Primary School
- Lat-ey Primary School

=== Secondary school ===
- Mataragan National Agricultural School
