= Jerry Dalipog =

Filipino politician

The Honorable Jerry Dalipog
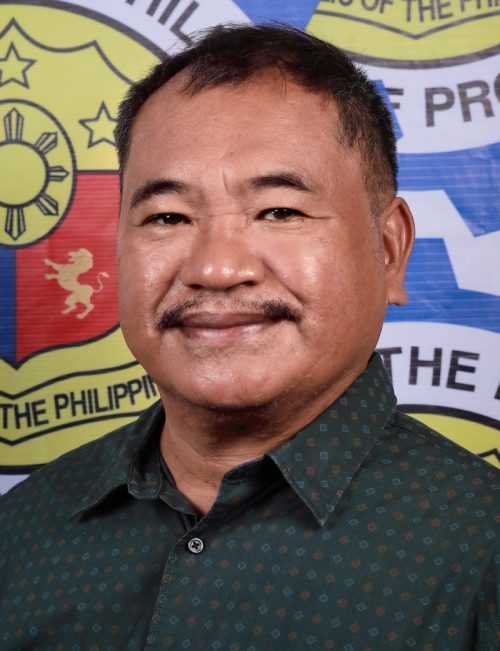

18th Governor of Ifugao
- Incumbent
- Assumed office June 30, 2019
- Vice Governor: Glenn D. Prudenciano; Martin Omar Habawel
- Preceded by: Pedro G. Mayam-o

Mayor of Banaue
- In office June 30, 2016 – June 30, 2019

Personal details
- Born: Jerry Uyami Dalipog; February 20, 1964 (age 62) Banaue, Mountain Province, Philippines
- Party: Lakas–CMD (2024–present)
- Other political affiliations: KBL (2021–2024); NUP (2018-2021); PDP–Laban (2016–2018); Independent (2015-2016)
- Education: Baguio Colleges Foundation (BS)

Jerry Uyami Dalipog (born February 20, 1964), is a Filipino civil engineer and politician from the province of Banaue, Ifugao in the Philippines. He is the current governor of Ifugao Province in the Philippine Cordillera Region. Previously, he was the municipal mayor of Banaue from 2016 to 2019.

Political offices
Preceded by Jose Gullitiw	Governor of Ifugao; 2019–present	Incumbent
