= Governor of Ifugao =

Local chief executive

Provincial Governor of Ifugao
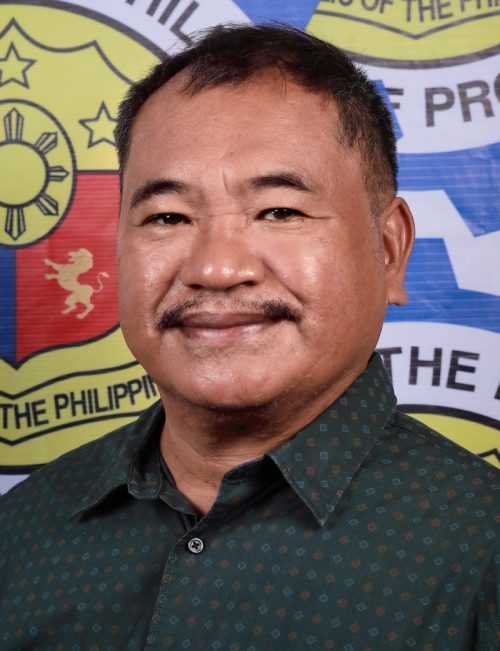
- Incumbent; Jerry U. Dalipog since June 30, 2019
- Appointer: Elected via popular vote
- Term length: 3 years
- Inaugural holder: Gualberto Lumauig
- Formation: 1966
- Website: https://ifugao.gov.ph/

The governor of Ifugao (Filipino: Punong Panlalawigan ng Ifugao), is the chief executive of the provincial government of Ifugao.

== Lieutenant Governors and Deputy Governors of the Sub-province of Ifugao (1901-1966) ==
No.	Image	Name	Year in office
1		Lt. Levi Case (First Lieutenant-Governor of Ifugao)	1902-1905
2		Lt. Jefferson Gallman	1905-1913
3		Lt. Owen Tomlinson	1913-1915
4		Lt. William Dosser	1915-1927
5		Capt. Mariano Meimban	1927-1930
6		Capt. Pedro Bulan	1930-1936
7		Luis Pawid Sr.	1936-1942
8		Jose Dulinayan	1942-1943
9		Valerio Famorca	1943-1944
10		Alejandro Fontanilla	1944-1945
(7)		Luis Pawid Sr.	1946-1947
11		Leopoldo Culhi	1947-1949
12		Alfredo Cappleman	1949-1952
13		Raymundo Baguilat	1952-1953
14		Nicolas Liangna	1953-1959
15		Santiago Habawel	1959-1963
16		Jose Guinid	1963-1966
17		Victor Codamon	1966-1967

== Provincial Governors (since 1966) ==
There have been 13 governors of Ifugao since its creation in 1966.

No.	Image	Name	Year in office
1		Gualberto B. Lumauig	1967-1976
2		Brig. Gen. Zosimo Paredes Sr.	1976-1986
3		Juan B. Dait	1986-1987
4		Daniel Culhi	1987-1988
5		Benjamin B. Cappleman	1988-1992
6		Albert Pawingi	1992-1995
7		Ildefonso Dulinayan	1995-2001
8		Teodoro B. Baguilat Jr.	2001-2004
(5)		Benjamin B. Cappleman	2004-2006
9		Glenn D. Prudenciano	2006-2007
(8)		Teodoro B. Baguilat Jr.	2007-2010
10		Eugene M. Balitang	2010-2013
11		Dennis G. Habawel	2013-2016
12		Pedro G. Mayam-o	2016-2019
13		Jerry U. Dalipog	2019-present

== See also ==
- List of vice governors of Ifugao
