= Dominic Valera =

Filipino politician (born 1948)

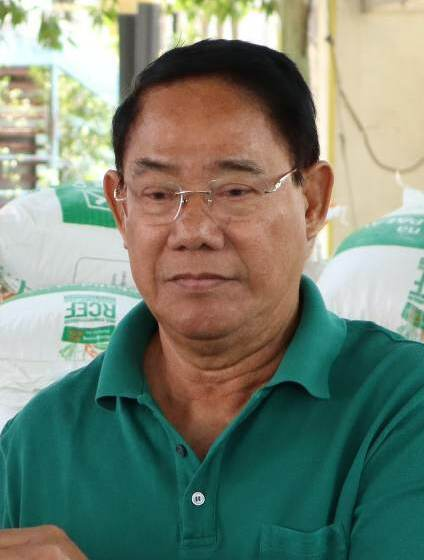

Governor of Abra
- In office June 30, 2022 – December 9, 2024 (Note: Suspended on December 9, 2024)
- Vice Governor: Joy Bernos
- Preceded by: Joy Bernos
- Succeeded by: Russell Bragas (Note: acting since December 9, 2024)

Mayor of Bangued, Abra
- In office June 30, 2013 – June 30, 2022
- Succeeded by: Mila Valera

Personal details
- Born: Dominic Bosuego Valera; July 18, 1948 (age 78) Bangued, Abra, Philippines
- Party: NUP (2015–present); Asenso Abrenio (local party; 2010–present)
- Other political affiliations: Liberal (2012–2015); Lakas–CMD (2008–2012); KAMPI (2007–2008)
- Occupation: Politician

Dominic "Nic" Bosuego Valera (born July 18, 1948) is a Filipino politician who was the Governor of Abra before being suspended on December 9, 2024.

== Career ==
Valera was the mayor of Bangued from 2010 to 2013, he shot a supporter of his political rival, causing him to be arrested. Valera was again the mayor of Bangued from 2019 to 2022, under the party Asenso, winning with 21,425 votes. After his term, he ran for governor under the same party, winning with 74,288 votes.

On December 9, 2024, Valera was suspended by the Office of the President of the Philippines for two months on charges of abuse of power involving the selection of a replacement for a deceased municipal councilor of Bucay in 2023. He ran for mayor of Bangued in 2025 but lost to Perfecto Cardenas.

== Personal life ==
Dominic Valera is married to Bangued mayor Mila Valera. His daughter, Joy Bernos, is the Vice-Governor of Abra, while his son Joseph Valera, is the mayor of Pidigan, Abra, and his grandson, Joaquin Bernos, is the vice mayor of Bangued.
