= Asenso Abrenio =

- Headquarters: Abra
- Ideology: Regionalism; Nationalism
- House of Representatives: 0 / 1 (Abra seat only)
- Provincial Governor: 0 / 1
- Provincial Vice Governor: 0 / 1
- Provincial Board Members: 2 / 14

Asenso Abrenio ("Progress for Abrenians") is a Filipino political party in the province of Abra. The party is associated with the Valera-Bernos political clan, which held the province's top posts for several years. The party secured a seat in the House of Representatives of the Philippines in the 2019 elections. In the 2019 local elections, the party captured the seats of the governor and vice-governor of Abra and gained control of the Abra Provincial Board.

The party maintained dominance in Abra politics through the 2019 and 2022 election cycles. However, in late 2024, the party leadership faced legal challenges. In August 2024, Vice Governor Joy Bernos was suspended by the Office of the President following an administrative order. This was followed by the suspension of Governor Dominic Valera in December 2024.

In the 2025 general elections, Asenso Abrenio suffered significant losses to the "team Progreso", apparently associated with Partido Federal ng Pilipinas (PFP). The party lost the gubernatorial and vice-gubernatorial races, marking a shift in the political landscape of the province.
