= Governor of Abra =

Local chief executive

- Gobernador ng Lalawigan ng Abra (Filipino)
- Incumbent; Takit Bersamin since June 30, 2025
- Style: The Honorable
- Seat: Abra Provincial Capitol
- Term length: 3 years
- Inaugural holder: Juan G. Villamor
- Formation: 1902

The governor of Abra (Filipino: Punong lalawigan ng Abra) is the chief executive of the Philippine province of Abra, a landlocked province in the Cordillera Administrative Region of the Philippines. The position has evolved from a colonial military appointment to a democratically elected office.

== Historical Background ==
The province of Abra was established as a comandancia politico-militar in 1846 during the Spanish colonial period. It was administered by a military governor appointed by the Spanish colonial government. These governors, typically Spanish officers, exercised both civil and military authority, particularly in efforts to pacify local indigenous groups, collect tribute, and enforce colonial laws. The first capital of the province was the town of Bucay. Among the notable Spanish governors during this period were Don Ramon Tajonera y Marzal and Don Esteban de Peñarrubia.

Following the Spanish-American War in 1898, the Philippines came under American administration. In 1901, Colonel William Bowen was appointed as the military governor of Abra by the American colonial government. The following year, in 1902, civil government was established in the province, and Juan G. Villamor, a lawyer and journalist, became the first Filipino civil governor. Villamor would later serve as a senator of the Philippines.

In 1905, under Act No. 1306 of the Philippine Commission, Abra was annexed to the neighboring province of Ilocos Sur as part of an administrative reorganization. This status lasted until 1917, when Abra was reconstituted as a separate province through Act No. 2683.

With the inauguration of the Republic of the Philippines in 1946, the governorship of Abra became an elective position. Under the 1987 Philippine Constitution, the governor is elected by popular vote and serves a term of three years, with a maximum of three consecutive terms.

== List of Governors ==
Below is a chronological list of Abra’s civil governors during the American period and the post-independence era:

No.	Image	Governor	Term	Ref
1		Juan G. Villamor	1902–1904	
2		Joaquin J. Ortega	1904–1914	
3		Rosalio G. Eduarte	1914–1916	
4		Julio V. Borbon	1916–1922	
5		Virgilio V. Valera	1922–1925	
6		Eustaquio P. Purugganan	1925–1930	
7		Virgilio V. Valera	1930–1936	
8		Bienvenido N. Valera	1936–1939	
9		Eustaquio P. Purugganan	1939–1941	
10		Bernardo V. Bayquen	1941–1944	
11		Zacarias A. Crispin	1944–1946	
12		Juan C. Brillantes	1946–1947	
13		Luis F. Bersamin	1947–1951	
14		Lucas P. Paredes	1951–1953	
-		Vene B. Pe Benito	1953	
15		Ernesto P. Parel	1953–1954	
16		Jose L. Valera	1954–1963	
17		Carmelo Z. Barbero	1963–1965	
18		Petronilo V. Seares	1965–1971	
19		Gabino V. Balbin	1971–1977	
20		Arturo V. Barbero	1977–1984	
21		Andres B. Bernos	1984–1986	
22		Vicente Ysidro P. Valera	1986–1987	
-		Buenaventura V. Buenafe	1987	
(22)		Vicente Ysidro P. Valera	1988–1998	
-		Constante B. Culangen	1998	
23		Maria Zita C. Claustro-Valera	1998–2001	
(22)		Vicente Ysidro P. Valera	2001–2007	
24		Eustaquio P. Bersamin	2007–2016	
25		Maria Jocelyn A. Valera-Bernos	2016–2022	
26		Dominic B. Valera	2022–2024 (Note: Suspended since December 9, 2024)	
-		Russell A. Bragas	2024-2025	
(24)		Eustaquio P. Bersamin	2025-present	
