= 2010 Cordillera Administrative Region local elections =

Local elections were held in the Cordillera Administrative Region on May 10, 2010, as part of the 2010 Philippine general election.

== Abra ==
=== Governor ===
Incumbent governor Takit Bersamin of Lakas–Kampi–CMD won re-election to a second term.

Candidate	Party	Votes	%
Takit Bersamin	Lakas–Kampi–CMD	89,985	95.57
Lizardo Sinogo Jr.	Independent	4,172	4.43
Total		94,157	100.00
Valid votes		94,157	78.69
Invalid/blank votes		25,494	21.31
Total votes		119,651	100.00
Lakas–Kampi–CMD hold			
Source: Commission on Elections

=== Vice Governor ===
Incumbent Vice Governor Victorino Baroña Jr. of the Liberal Party ran for mayor of Bucay. Pilar mayor Rolando Somera of Lakas–Kampi–CMD won the election.

Candidate	Party	Votes	%
Rolando Somera	Lakas–Kampi–CMD	55,960	59.67
Betzaida Alzate	Independent	37,822	40.33
Total		93,782	100.00
Valid votes		93,782	78.38
Invalid/blank votes		25,869	21.62
Total votes		119,651	100.00
Lakas–Kampi–CMD gain from Liberal Party			
Source: Commission on Elections

=== Provincial Board ===
The Abra Provincial Board is composed of 12 board members, 8 of whom are elected.

Party	Votes	%	Seats
Lakas–Kampi–CMD	123,564	38.86	4
Liberal Party	103,877	32.67	3
Laban ng Demokratikong Pilipino	21,330	6.71	0
Pwersa ng Masang Pilipino	5,093	1.60	0
Independent	64,129	20.17	1
Total	317,993	100.00	8
Total votes	119,651	–	
Source: Commission on Elections

==== 1st district ====
Candidate	Party	Votes	%
Elmer Bides	Liberal Party	23,915	16.95
Floro Fontanilla	Liberal Party	18,081	12.82
Elmer Gayao Sr.	Lakas–Kampi–CMD	17,531	12.43
Nancy Lupang	Lakas–Kampi–CMD	17,152	12.16
Noel Beroña	Lakas–Kampi–CMD	14,042	9.96
Dante Bersalona	Independent	13,387	9.49
Rudolfo Bernardez	Lakas–Kampi–CMD	9,976	7.07
Elizalde Pacsa	Independent	8,599	6.10
Josefino Valencia	Independent	6,027	4.27
Darbie Madriaga	Laban ng Demokratikong Pilipino	5,943	4.21
John Blue	Pwersa ng Masang Pilipino	3,464	2.46
Luciano Beng-ad	Pwersa ng Masang Pilipino	1,629	1.15
Noel Quibayen	Independent	1,304	0.92
Total		141,050	100.00
Total votes		54,523	–
Source: Commission on Elections

==== 2nd district ====
Candidate	Party	Votes	%
Kathleen Maria Balbin	Lakas–Kampi–CMD	31,152	17.61
Rosario Bersamin	Liberal Party	25,920	14.65
Allen Brix Bachiller	Lakas–Kampi–CMD	19,064	10.77
Maria Elena Jenkins	Independent	18,751	10.60
Ramon Dickson	Liberal Party	18,463	10.43
Rogelio Elveña	Liberal Party	17,498	9.89
Correa Seares	Independent	16,061	9.08
Joselito Benedito	Laban ng Demokratikong Pilipino	15,387	8.70
Serafin Alzate	Lakas–Kampi–CMD	14,647	8.28
Total		176,943	100.00
Total votes		65,128	–
Source: Commission on Elections

== Apayao ==
=== Governor ===
Term-limited incumbent governor Elias Bulut Sr. of Lakas–Kampi–CMD ran for mayor of Calanasan. Lakas–Kampi–CMD nominated Bulut's son, representative Elias Bulut Jr., who won the election.

Candidate	Party	Votes	%
Elias Bulut Jr.	Lakas–Kampi–CMD	38,421	90.83
Ambaro Sagle	Kilusang Bagong Lipunan	3,504	8.28
Tito Salleb	Independent	377	0.89
Total		42,302	100.00
Lakas–Kampi–CMD hold			

=== Vice Governor ===
Incumbent Vice Governor Hector Reuel Pascua of Lakas–Kampi–CMD won re-election to a second term against Kabugao mayor Reynald Talimbatog of the Liberal Party.

=== Provincial Board ===
The Apayao Provincial Board is composed of 12 board members, 8 of whom are elected.

==== 1st district ====
The following were elected as provincial board members in the 1st district:

- Sedolito Bernard Agunos (Lakas–Kampi–CMD)
- Frederick Amid (Lakas–Kampi–CMD)
- Jose Hortelano (Lakas–Kampi–CMD)
- Angel Umingli (Lakas–Kampi–CMD)

The following were the other candidates who ran in the provincial board election in the 1st district:

- Manuel Betat (Liberal Party)
- Joseph Eming (Liberal Party)
- Benjamin Leguiab Jr. (Nacionalista Party)

==== 2nd district ====
The following were elected as provincial board members in the 2nd district:

- Norman Agonoy (Lakas–Kampi–CMD)
- Remy Albano (Lakas–Kampi–CMD)
- Bobby Balanay (Lakas–Kampi–CMD)
- Catalina Galleon (Lakas–Kampi–CMD)

The following were the other candidates who ran in the provincial board election in the 2nd district:

- Clayford Ballesteros (Independent)
- Lester Lee Calaycay (Nacionalista Party)
- Demetrio Conde Jr. (Nationalist People's Coalition)
- Doroteo Tamaken (Nacionalista Party)

== Baguio ==
=== Mayor ===
Incumbent mayor Reinaldo Bautista Jr. ran for the House of Representatives in Baguio's lone district as an independent. Representative Mauricio Domogan of Lakas–Kampi–CMD won the election.

Candidate	Party	Votes	%
Mauricio Domogan	Lakas–Kampi–CMD	47,374	44.97
Jose Molintas	Liberal Party	26,712	25.36
Mark Go	Pwersa ng Masang Pilipino	21,072	20.00
Elaine Sembrano	PDP–Laban	4,644	4.41
Ramon Labo Jr.	Independent	3,463	3.29
Julius Mandapat	Independent	1,416	1.34
Erlinda Busacay-Lazo	Independent	276	0.26
Guillermo Hernandez	Independent	265	0.25
Peter Puzon	Independent	66	0.06
Ruben Barcelo	Independent	55	0.05
Total		105,343	100.00
Valid votes		105,343	97.53
Invalid/blank votes		2,668	2.47
Total votes		108,011	100.00
Lakas–Kampi–CMD gain from Independent			
Source: Commission on Elections

=== Vice Mayor ===
Incumbent Vice Mayor Daniel Farinas of the Nacionalista Party won re-election to a second term.

Candidate	Party	Votes	%
Daniel Farinas	Nacionalista Party	55,157	57.55
Faustino Olowan	Independent	33,488	34.94
Carol Domalsin	Laban ng Demokratikong Pilipino	7,205	7.52
Total		95,850	100.00
Valid votes		95,850	88.74
Invalid/blank votes		12,161	11.26
Total votes		108,011	100.00
Nacionalista Party hold			
Source: Commission on Elections

=== City Council ===
The Baguio City Council is composed of 12 councilors, 10 of whom are elected.

Party	Votes	%	Seats
Lakas–Kampi–CMD	303,042	29.89	4
Liberal Party	201,461	19.87	3
Nacionalista Party	198,084	19.54	2
Pwersa ng Masang Pilipino	30,941	3.05	0
PDP–Laban	23,371	2.30	0
Laban ng Demokratikong Pilipino	16,034	1.58	0
Partido Demokratiko Sosyalista ng Pilipinas	2,182	0.22	0
Independent	238,863	23.56	1
Total	1,013,978	100.00	10
Total votes	108,011	–	
Source: Commission on Elections

Candidate	Party	Votes	%
Nicasio Aliping Jr.	Lakas–Kampi–CMD	54,159	5.34
Betty Lourdes Tabanda	Lakas–Kampi–CMD	53,260	5.25
Isabelo Cosalan Jr.	Liberal Party	47,121	4.65
Elmer Datuin	Lakas–Kampi–CMD	45,240	4.46
Peter Fianza	Independent	43,297	4.27
Edison Bilog	Liberal Party	42,958	4.24
Richard Cariño	Nacionalista Party	39,373	3.88
Perlita Rondez	Nacionalista Party	37,913	3.74
Fred Bagbagen	Liberal Party	37,525	3.70
Erdolfo Balajadia	Lakas–Kampi–CMD	35,666	3.52
Philian Louise Weygan	Nacionalista Party	35,662	3.52
Nicasio Palaganas	Lakas–Kampi–CMD	35,490	3.50
Edilberto Tenefrancia	Independent	35,246	3.48
Sonia Daoas	Independent	31,467	3.10
Cynthia Tabora-Tuason	Nacionalista Party	26,573	2.62
Mabini Maskay	Lakas–Kampi–CMD	21,582	2.13
Arthur Allad-iw	Independent	20,487	2.02
George Dumawing Jr.	Lakas–Kampi–CMD	20,143	1.99
Narciso Padilla	Independent	19,478	1.92
Alexander Francisco Ortega	Nacionalista Party	18,176	1.79
Richard Zarate	Nacionalista Party	17,886	1.76
Ronald Perez	Independent	17,421	1.72
Jose Olarte Jr.	Liberal Party	16,944	1.67
Pablito Gumnad	Liberal Party	16,214	1.60
Voltaire Acosta	PDP–Laban	15,648	1.54
Rufino Panagan	Lakas–Kampi–CMD	15,290	1.51
Roney Gandeza	Nacionalista Party	15,043	1.48
Alan Antonio Mazo	Liberal Party	14,007	1.38
Rafael Delson	Independent	13,666	1.35
Patrick Dangatan	Lakas–Kampi–CMD	13,536	1.33
Antonino Cortes Jr.	Liberal Party	12,969	1.28
Orlando Lardizabal	Pwersa ng Masang Pilipino	12,210	1.20
Laurence Adube	Laban ng Demokratikong Pilipino	10,864	1.07
Lorenzo Pilando	Independent	9,187	0.91
Arturo Quilop	Lakas–Kampi–CMD	8,676	0.86
Lourdes Teliaken	Independent	8,024	0.79
Fred Fangonon	Independent	7,934	0.78
Alberto Reyes	PDP–Laban	7,723	0.76
Richard Carlos	Liberal Party	6,970	0.69
Joseph Marrero	Liberal Party	6,753	0.67
Carlos Asiatico	Independent	6,475	0.64
Roberto Ocampo	Independent	5,931	0.58
Rafael Wasan	Pwersa ng Masang Pilipino	5,733	0.57
Robin Coteng	Nacionalista Party	5,592	0.55
Odell Aquino	Pwersa ng Masang Pilipino	5,291	0.52
Rodolfo Paragas	Laban ng Demokratikong Pilipino	5,170	0.51
Edgar Allan Beltran	Independent	4,286	0.42
Antolin Mascarenas	Pwersa ng Masang Pilipino	4,023	0.40
Reynaldo Diaz	Pwersa ng Masang Pilipino	3,684	0.36
Roi David	Independent	3,667	0.36
Edilberto Gapuz	Independent	3,614	0.36
Wilfredo Delacerna Sr.	Independent	2,932	0.29
Benjamin Macadangdang	Independent	2,488	0.25
Anthony Araos	Partido Demokratiko Sosyalista ng Pilipinas	2,182	0.22
Edgardo Duque	Independent	1,874	0.18
Emmanuel Clemente	Nacionalista Party	1,866	0.18
Gerardo Antolin	Independent	1,389	0.14
Total		1,013,978	100.00
Total votes		108,011	–
Source: Commission on Elections

== Benguet ==
=== Governor ===
Incumbent Governor Nestor Fongwan of Lakas–Kampi–CMD won re-election to a second term.

Candidate	Party	Votes	%
Nestor Fongwan	Lakas–Kampi–CMD	87,618	59.05
Samuel Dangwa	Independent	40,563	27.34
Raul Molintas	Nationalist People's Coalition	20,189	13.61
Total		148,370	100.00
Valid votes		148,370	96.00
Invalid/blank votes		6,179	4.00
Total votes		154,549	100.00
Lakas–Kampi–CMD hold			
Source: Commission on Elections

=== Vice Governor ===
Incumbent Vice Governor Crescensio Pacalso of Lakas–Kampi–CMD won re-election to a third term.

Candidate	Party	Votes	%
Crescensio Pacalso	Lakas–Kampi–CMD	100,594	76.64
Wasing Sacla	PDP–Laban	30,664	23.36
Total		131,258	100.00
Valid votes		131,258	84.93
Invalid/blank votes		23,291	15.07
Total votes		154,549	100.00
Lakas–Kampi–CMD hold			
Source: Commission on Elections

=== Provincial Board ===
The Benguet Provincial Board is composed of 14 board members, 10 of whom are elected.

Party	Votes	%	Seats
Lakas–Kampi–CMD	281,879	50.25	8
Nationalist People's Coalition	56,855	10.13	1
PDP–Laban	47,059	8.39	0
Nacionalista Party	38,429	6.85	0
Liberal Party	28,699	5.12	0
Independent	108,084	19.27	1
Total	561,005	100.00	10
Total votes	154,549	–	
Source: Commission on Elections

==== 1st district ====
Candidate	Party	Votes	%
Juan Nazarro Jr.	Lakas–Kampi–CMD	27,005	16.40
Alfonso Fianza	Lakas–Kampi–CMD	25,310	15.37
Benjamin Saguid	Lakas–Kampi–CMD	20,531	12.47
Johnny Waguis	Lakas–Kampi–CMD	20,530	12.47
Francisco Golingab	Liberal Party	19,311	11.73
Fernando Aritao	PDP–Laban	15,127	9.19
Rimando Anguitay	Nacionalista Party	12,430	7.55
Ernesto Matuday	Liberal Party	9,388	5.70
Romulo Polon	Nacionalista Party	7,925	4.81
Philip Canuto	Independent	5,362	3.26
Albert Claro	Nacionalista Party	1,704	1.04
Total		164,623	100.00
Total votes		57,867	–
Source: Commission on Elections

==== 2nd district ====
Candidate	Party	Votes	%
Nelson Dangwa	Independent	49,685	12.53
Florence Tingbaoen	Lakas–Kampi–CMD	40,623	10.25
Apolinario Camsol	Lakas–Kampi–CMD	40,236	10.15
Rogelio Leon	Lakas–Kampi–CMD	38,669	9.76
Concepcion Balao	Nationalist People's Coalition	35,358	8.92
Nardo Cayat	Lakas–Kampi–CMD	33,930	8.56
John Botiwey	PDP–Laban	31,932	8.06
Jaime Paul Panganiban	Independent	23,676	5.97
Joseph Cosente	Nationalist People's Coalition	21,497	5.42
Loreto Buya-an	Lakas–Kampi–CMD	19,911	5.02
Samson Paran	Independent	17,746	4.48
Jose Andiso	Nacionalista Party	16,370	4.13
Lolito Sarac	Lakas–Kampi–CMD	15,134	3.82
Catherine Poole	Independent	8,742	2.21
Albert Martinez	Independent	2,873	0.72
Total		396,382	100.00
Total votes		96,682	–
Source: Commission on Elections

== Ifugao ==
=== Governor ===
Incumbent Governor Teddy Baguilat of the Liberal Party ran for the House of Representatives in Ifugao's lone district. The Liberal Party nominated Eugene Balitang, who won the election.

Candidate	Party	Votes	%
Eugene Balitang	Liberal Party	40,080	52.74
Samuel Dangwa	Lakas–Kampi–CMD	35,389	46.56
Manuel Dangayo	Independent	532	0.70
Total		76,001	100.00
Valid votes		76,001	95.06
Invalid/blank votes		3,953	4.94
Total votes		79,954	100.00
Liberal Party hold			
Source: Commission on Elections

=== Vice Governor ===
Incumbent Vice Governor Nora Dinamling of Lakas–Kampi–CMD ran for re-election to a second term, but was defeated by Pedro Mayam-o of the Liberal Party.

Candidate	Party	Votes	%
Pedro Mayam-o	Liberal Party	37,026	50.45
Nora Dinamling	Lakas–Kampi–CMD	22,052	30.05
Aloysius Lumauig	Independent	14,315	19.50
Total		73,393	100.00
Valid votes		73,393	91.79
Invalid/blank votes		6,561	8.21
Total votes		79,954	100.00
Lakas–Kampi–CMD hold			
Source: Commission on Elections

=== Provincial Board ===
The Ifugao Provincial Board is composed of 11 board members, 8 of whom are elected.

Party	Votes	%	Seats
Liberal Party	70,477	26.73	0
Nacionalista Party	66,680	25.29	3
Lakas–Kampi–CMD	60,676	23.01	3
Independent	65,807	24.96	2
Total	263,640	100.00	8
Total votes	79,954	–	
Source: Commission on Elections

==== 1st district ====
Candidate	Party	Votes	%
Jose Jordan Gullitiw	Nacionalista Party	18,408	12.05
Robert Humiwat	Nacionalista Party	17,896	11.72
Victor Bunnol Jr.	Independent	16,915	11.07
Robert Mangyao	Nacionalista Party	16,294	10.67
Mariano Buyagawan Jr.	Liberal Party	16,146	10.57
Virgilio Inhumang Jr.	Liberal Party	14,556	9.53
Rodolfo Dulnuan	Nacionalista Party	14,082	9.22
Albert Indunan	Liberal Party	13,219	8.65
Joaquin Dugyon Jr.	Liberal Party	12,412	8.13
Gabriel Buyucan	Independent	8,543	5.59
Emilio Bugatti	Independent	4,279	2.80
Total		152,750	100.00
Total votes		45,816	–
Source: Commission on Elections

==== 2nd district ====
Candidate	Party	Votes	%
Joseph Odan	Lakas–Kampi–CMD	19,202	17.32
Clemente Bongtiwon	Lakas–Kampi–CMD	16,855	15.20
James Frederick Dulnuan	Independent	15,204	13.71
Samson Atluna	Lakas–Kampi–CMD	12,806	11.55
Aldrin Guingayan	Lakas–Kampi–CMD	11,813	10.65
Roger Herman	Independent	8,552	7.71
Antonio Bangachon	Independent	8,069	7.28
George Gumman Jr.	Liberal Party	7,986	7.20
Fe Ballogan	Liberal Party	3,399	3.07
Rolando Paligan	Liberal Party	2,759	2.49
Manuel Chilagan	Independent	2,711	2.44
Renato Patacsil	Independent	1,534	1.38
Total		110,890	100.00
Total votes		34,138	–
Source: Commission on Elections

== Kalinga ==
=== Governor ===
Incumbent Governor Floydelia Diasen of Lakas–Kampi–CMD ran for re-election to a second term, but was defeated by vice governor Jocel Baac of Pwersa ng Masang Pilipino.

Candidate	Party	Votes	%
Jocel Baac	Pwersa ng Masang Pilipino	30,731	33.15
Macario Duguiang	Nationalist People's Coalition	28,150	30.36
Floydelia Diasen	Lakas–Kampi–CMD	19,602	21.14
Conrado Dieza jr.	Liberal Party	9,235	9.96
Dante Langkit	Independent	4,992	5.38
Total		92,710	100.00
Valid votes		92,710	94.99
Invalid/blank votes		4,889	5.01
Total votes		97,599	100.00
Pwersa ng Masang Pilipino gain from Lakas–Kampi–CMD			
Source: Commission on Elections

=== Vice Governor ===
Incumbent Vice Governor Jocel Baac of Pwersa ng Masang Pilipino (PMP) ran for Governor of Kalinga. The PMP nominated Efraim Orodio, who was defeated by Balbalan mayor Allen Jesse Mangaoang of the Nacionalista Party.

Candidate	Party	Votes	%
Allen Jesse Mangaoang	Nacionalista Party	34,924	38.52
Benigno Duyan	Aksyon Demokratiko	22,671	25.00
Johnny Maymaya	Nationalist People's Coalition	21,533	23.75
Efraim Orodio	Pwersa ng Masang Pilipino	11,538	12.73
Total		90,666	100.00
Valid votes		90,666	92.90
Invalid/blank votes		6,933	7.10
Total votes		97,599	100.00
Nacionalista Party gain from Pwersa ng Masang Pilipino			
Source: Commission on Elections

=== Provincial Board ===
The Kalinga Provincial Board is composed of 12 board members, 8 of whom are elected.

Party	Votes	%	Seats
Lakas–Kampi–CMD	82,252	26.67	3
Liberal Party	49,007	15.89	0
Pwersa ng Masang Pilipino	25,906	8.40	1
Aksyon Demokratiko	20,364	6.60	1
Nationalist People's Coalition	17,964	5.83	0
Nacionalista Party	12,660	4.11	0
Independent	100,210	32.50	3
Total	308,363	100.00	8
Total votes	97,599	–	
Source: Commission on Elections

==== 1st district ====
Candidate	Party	Votes	%
Dave Odiem	Independent	17,267	12.02
Roy Dickpus	Independent	14,047	9.78
Chester Alunday	Lakas–Kampi–CMD	13,791	9.60
Alfonso Canao	Independent	12,809	8.92
Deogenes Gupaal	Nacionalista Party	12,660	8.82
Martin Polittud	Lakas–Kampi–CMD	12,202	8.50
Saturnino Bangon	Independent	11,809	8.22
Wilfredo Dugayon	Liberal Party	11,747	8.18
Roderick Dumallig	Independent	11,667	8.12
Remedios Baltao	Independent	11,173	7.78
Lino Gubat	Independent	7,801	5.43
Charles Abay	Pwersa ng Masang Pilipino	5,719	3.98
Arlene Alicog	Independent	915	0.64
Total		143,607	100.00
Total votes		44,011	–
Source: Commission on Elections

==== 2nd district ====
Candidate	Party	Votes	%
Gelacio Bongngat	Lakas–Kampi–CMD	25,094	15.23
Eduardo Sarol	Lakas–Kampi–CMD	22,568	13.70
Gkachay Claver	Aksyon Demokratiko	20,364	12.36
Ludar Luyaben	Pwersa ng Masang Pilipino	20,187	12.25
Marquez Sal-ao	Nationalist People's Coalition	17,964	10.90
Andres Ngao-i	Liberal Party	16,494	10.01
Eduardo Buliyat	Liberal Party	15,442	9.37
Mario Baquiran Sr.	Independent	12,722	7.72
Teresita Ocyo	Lakas–Kampi–CMD	8,597	5.22
Oscar Paguinto	Liberal Party	5,324	3.23
Total		164,756	100.00
Total votes		53,588	–
Source: Commission on Elections

== Mountain Province ==
=== Governor ===
Incumbent Governor Maximo Dalog of Lakas–Kampi–CMD ran for the House of Representatives in Mountain Province's lone district. Former governor Leonard Mayaen of the Nacionalista Party won the election.

Candidate	Party	Votes	%
Leonard Mayaen	Nacionalista Party	22,310	32.03
Marcial Lawilao Jr.	Lapiang Manggagawa	17,488	25.11
Ezra Samson Gomez	Laban ng Demokratikong Pilipino	16,860	24.21
Harry Dominguez	Nationalist People's Coalition	6,610	9.49
Louis Claver Jr.	Liberal Party	6,240	8.96
Albert Padayos	Independent	135	0.19
Total		69,643	100.00
Valid votes		69,643	93.12
Invalid/blank votes		5,148	6.88
Total votes		74,791	100.00
Nacionalista Party gain from Lakas–Kampi–CMD			
Source: ibanangayon.ph

=== Vice Governor ===
Incumbent Vice Governor Benjamin Dominguez, an independent, retired. Bonifacio Lacwasan won the election as an independent.

Candidate	Party	Votes	%
Bonifacio Lacwasan	Independent	38,450	58.26
Glenn Manao	Independent	15,309	23.19
Arbee Talastas	Independent	12,243	18.55
Total		66,002	100.00
Valid votes		66,002	88.25
Invalid/blank votes		8,789	11.75
Total votes		74,791	100.00
Independent hold			
Source: ibanangayon.ph

=== Provincial Board ===
The Mountain Province Provincial Board is composed of 12 board members, 8 of whom are elected.

Party	Votes	%	Seats
Lakas–Kampi–CMD	75,569	33.76	3
Nacionalista Party	50,426	22.53	2
Liberal Party	25,955	11.59	1
Nationalist People's Coalition	10,636	4.75	0
Independent	61,265	27.37	2
Total	223,851	100.00	8
Total votes	74,791	–	
Source: ibanangayon.ph

==== 1st district ====
Candidate	Party	Votes	%
Raul Lapon	Nacionalista Party	13,561	12.72
Cariño Tamang	Lakas–Kampi–CMD	12,698	11.91
Alfonso Kiat-Ong Sr.	Lakas–Kampi–CMD	12,677	11.89
Johny Lausan	Independent	11,353	10.65
Marcelino Balaso Jr.	Nacionalista Party	9,926	9.31
Dionisio Chungalan	Nacionalista Party	9,330	8.75
Cyril Bacala	Lakas–Kampi–CMD	8,038	7.54
Jimmy Galingan	Lakas–Kampi–CMD	7,498	7.03
Ciriaco Filog	Liberal Party	7,157	6.71
Reynaldo Tawaran	Independent	6,046	5.67
Larry Banganan	Independent	4,480	4.20
Florencio Carlos	Liberal Party	3,855	3.62
Total		106,619	100.00
Total votes		35,752	–
Source: ibanangayon.ph

==== 2nd district ====
Candidate	Party	Votes	%
Constito Masweng	Lakas–Kampi–CMD	21,764	18.56
Randolph Awisan	Nacionalista Party	17,609	15.02
Salvador Dalang	Liberal Party	14,943	12.75
Carmelita Masidong	Independent	14,814	12.64
Michael Patting	Independent	13,105	11.18
Joseph Solang	Lakas–Kampi–CMD	12,894	11.00
Sorero Gullod	Independent	11,467	9.78
Alexander Maday-a	Nationalist People's Coalition	10,636	9.07
Total		117,232	100.00
Total votes		39,039	–
Source: ibanangayon.ph
