= 2022 Philippine House of Representatives elections in the Cordillera Administrative Region =

- May 9, 2022
- All 7 Cordillera Administrative Region seats in the House of Representatives
| Party | Seats | +/– |
|---|---|---|
| Nacionalista | 4 | +1 |
| UBP | 1 | New |
| PDP–Laban | 1 | 0 |
| NPC | 1 | −1 |
This lists parties that won seats. See the complete results below.

The 2022 Philippine House of Representatives elections in the Cordillera Administrative Region were held on May 9, 2022.

== Summary ==
| Congressional district | Incumbent | Incumbent's party | Winner | Winner's party | Winning margin |
|---|---|---|---|---|---|
| Abra | Joseph Bernos | Nacionalista | Ching Bernos | Nacionalista | Unopposed |
| Apayao | Elias Bulut Jr. | NPC | Eleanor Begtang | PDP–Laban | Unopposed |
| Baguio | Mark Go | Nacionalista | Mark Go | Nacionalista | 52.32% |
| Benguet | Vacant | | Eric Yap | UBP | 26.09% |
| Ifugao | Solomon Chungalao | NPC | Solomon Chungalao | NPC | 12.96% |
| Kalinga | Allen Jesse Mangaoang | Nacionalista | Allen Jesse Mangaoang | Nacionalista | 52.10% |
| Mountain Province | Maximo Dalog Jr. | Nacionalista | Maximo Dalog Jr. | Nacionalista | 12.18% |

== Abra ==
Incumbent Joseph Bernos of the Nacionalista Party retired to run for mayor of La Paz. He was previously affiliated with Asenso Abrenio.

The Nacionalista Party nominated Bernos' wife, La Paz mayor Ching Bernos, who won the election unopposed.

| Candidate | Party | Votes | % |
|---|---|---|---|
| Ching Bernos | Nacionalista Party | 122,344 | 100.00 |
| Total | | 122,344 | 100.00 |
| Total votes | | 159,540 | – |
| Registered voters/turnout | | 182,696 | 87.33 |
| Nacionalista hold | | | |
Source: Commission on Elections

== Apayao ==
Incumbent Elias Bulut Jr. of the Nationalist People's Coalition retired to run for governor of Apayao.

Bulut endorsed his sister, Apayao governor Eleanor Begtang, who won the election unopposed.

| Candidate | Party | Votes | % |
|---|---|---|---|
| Eleanor Begtang | PDP–Laban | 50,503 | 100.00 |
| Total | | 50,503 | 100.00 |
| Total votes | | 67,563 | – |
| Registered voters/turnout | | 78,454 | 86.12 |
| PDP–Laban gain from NPC | | | |
Source: Commission on Elections

== Baguio ==
Incumbent Mark Go of the Nacionalista Party ran for a third term.

Go won re-election against former representative Nicasio Aliping Jr. (Independent) and four other candidates.

| Candidate | Party | Votes | % |
|---|---|---|---|
| Mark Go (incumbent) | Nacionalista Party | 99,372 | 75.11 |
| Nicasio Aliping Jr. | Independent | 30,156 | 22.79 |
| Edgardo Duque | Independent | 982 | 0.74 |
| Rafael Wasan | Pederalismo ng Dugong Dakilang Samahan | 729 | 0.55 |
| Rey Zeta Diaz Jr. | Independent | 689 | 0.52 |
| Alexis Abano | Independent | 375 | 0.28 |
| Total | | 132,303 | 100.00 |
| Total votes | | 139,461 | – |
| Registered voters/turnout | | 168,218 | 82.90 |
| Nacionalista hold | | | |
Source: Commission on Elections

== Benguet ==
The seat was vacant after Nestor Fongwan of PDP–Laban died on December 18, 2019.

ACT-CIS party-list representative Eric Yap (United Benguet Party) won the election against Itogon mayor Victorio Palangdan (Kilusang Bagong Lipunan) and two other candidates.

| Candidate | Party | Votes | % |
|---|---|---|---|
| Eric Yap | United Benguet Party | 123,801 | 61.40 |
| Victorio Palangdan | Kilusang Bagong Lipunan | 71,200 | 35.31 |
| Sammy Paran | Independent | 4,457 | 2.21 |
| Thorrsson Keith | Independent | 2,162 | 1.07 |
| Total | | 201,620 | 100.00 |
| Total votes | | 209,228 | – |
| Registered voters/turnout | | 243,756 | 85.84 |
| UBP gain from PDP–Laban | | | |
Source: Commission on Elections

== Ifugao ==
Incumbent Solomon Chungalao of the Nationalist People's Coalition ran for a second term.

Chungalao won re-election against Lamut mayor Mariano Buyagawan Jr. (People's Reform Party), former Ifugao governor Eugene Balitang (Laban ng Demokratikong Pilipino) and Nelson Ayoc (Independent).

| Candidate | Party | Votes | % |
|---|---|---|---|
| Solomon Chungalao (incumbent) | Nationalist People's Coalition | 48,231 | 43.94 |
| Mariano Buyagawan Jr. | People's Reform Party | 34,004 | 30.98 |
| Eugene Balitang | Laban ng Demokratikong Pilipino | 27,227 | 24.80 |
| Nelson Ayoc | Independent | 310 | 0.28 |
| Total | | 109,772 | 100.00 |
| Total votes | | 113,067 | – |
| Registered voters/turnout | | 134,428 | 84.11 |
| NPC hold | | | |
Source: Commission on Elections

== Kalinga ==
Incumbent Allen Jesse Mangaoang of the Nacionalista Party ran for a third term.

Mangaoang won re-election against former provincial board member Roy Dickpus (Independent).

| Candidate | Party | Votes | % |
|---|---|---|---|
| Allen Jesse Mangaoang (incumbent) | Nacionalista Party | 94,430 | 76.05 |
| Roy Dickpus | Independent | 29,744 | 23.95 |
| Total | | 124,174 | 100.00 |
| Total votes | | 135,897 | – |
| Registered voters/turnout | | 154,423 | 88.00 |
| Nacionalista hold | | | |
Source: Commission on Elections

== Mountain Province ==
Incumbent Maximo Dalog Jr. of the Nacionalista Party ran for a second term.

Dalog won re-election against former Sabangan mayor Jup Dominguez (Lakas–CMD).

| Candidate | Party | Votes | % |
|---|---|---|---|
| Maximo Dalog Jr. (incumbent) | Nacionalista Party | 52,927 | 56.09 |
| Jup Dominguez | Lakas–CMD | 41,437 | 43.91 |
| Total | | 94,364 | 100.00 |
| Total votes | | 96,471 | – |
| Registered voters/turnout | | 115,925 | 83.22 |
| Nacionalista hold | | | |
Source: Commission on Elections
