= 2016 Philippine local elections =

- May 9, 2016

All local elected offices above the barangay level
	First party	Second party	Third party
Party	Liberal	NPC	NUP
Governors	40	9	9
Vice governors	39	8	8
Board members	335	104	69
Mayors	759	201	121
Vice mayors	705	182	127
Councilors	5,451	1,583	896
	Fourth party	Fifth party	Sixth party
Party	Nacionalista	UNA	PDP–Laban
Governors	8	3	0
Vice governors	6	5	1
Board members	66	54	6
Mayors	145	134	40
Vice mayors	139	142	33
Councilors	1,047	1,223	191
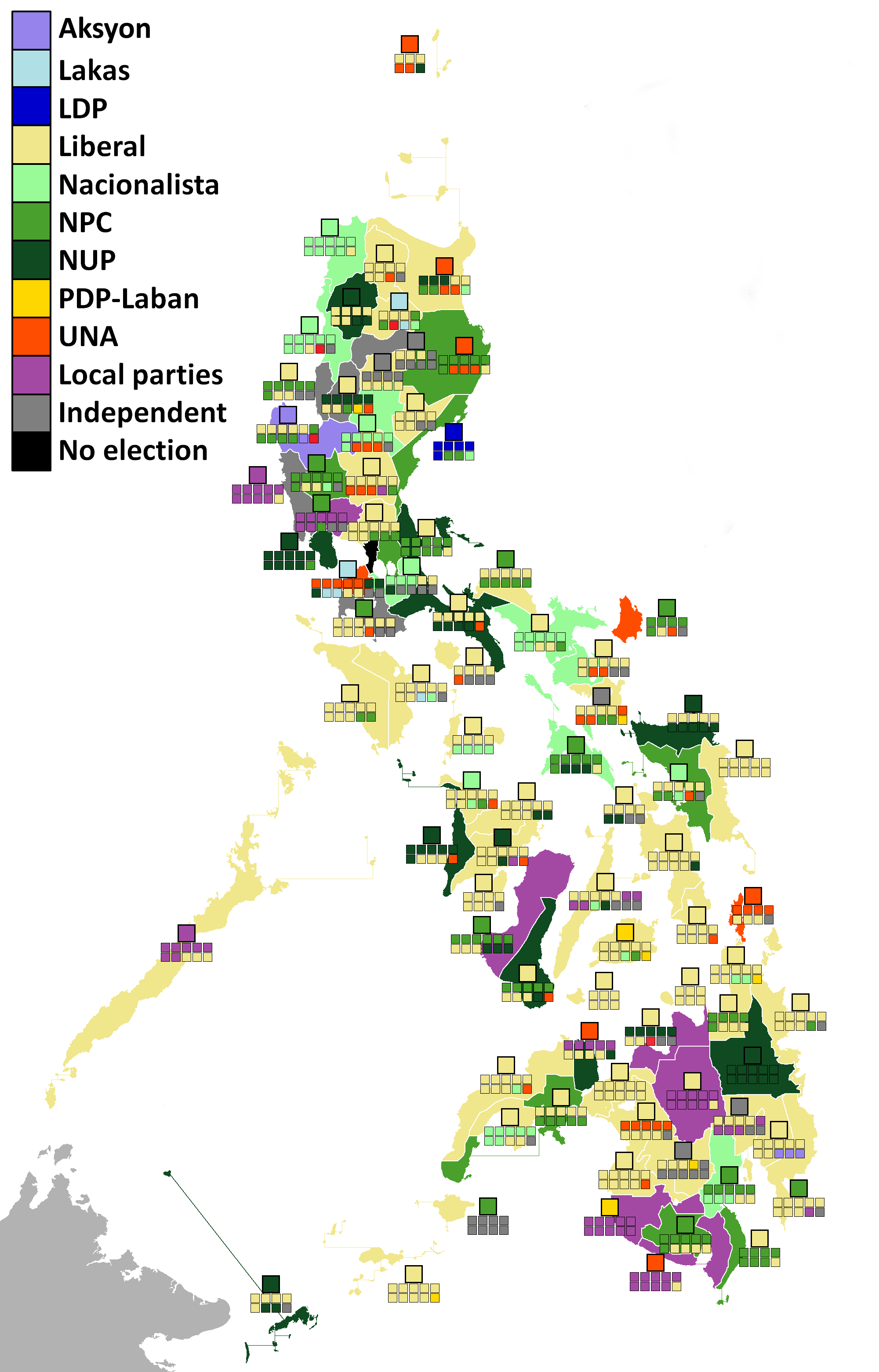
- The province's shade refers to the party of the winning governor. The larger box refers to the party of the winning vice-governor. The smaller boxes refers to the seats won by each party in the Sangguniang Panlalawigan. Note that this doesn't include the 3 ex officio seats.
President of the Union of Local Authorities of the Philippines before election
Oriental Mindoro Governor
Alfonso Umali
Liberal
Elected President of the Union of Local Authorities of the Philippines
Albay Governor
Francis Bichara
Nacionalista

Local elections in the Philippines were held on May 9, 2016. This was conducted together with the 2016 general election for national positions. All elected positions above the barangay (village) level were disputed.

== Electoral system ==
Every local government unit, be it a province, city, municipality or a barangay elects a chief executive (a governor, city mayor, municipal mayor and barangay chairman, respectively), and a local legislature (the Sangguniang Panlalawigan, Sangguniang Panlungsod, Sangguniang Bayan and Sangguniang Barangay, respectively), president upon by the chief executive's deputy (vice-governor, city vice-mayor, municipal vice-mayor, respectively; no equivalent for the barangay). In addition, the Autonomous Region in Muslim Mindanao (ARMM) elects a governor, vice-governor and members of the ARMM Regional Legislative Assembly.

Elections where one seat is being disputed, such as the regional governor and vice governor in the Autonomous Region in Muslim Mindanao, provincial governors and vice governors in each of the 81 provinces, and mayors and vice mayors in each of the 145 cities and 1,489 municipalities are elected via the plurality system.

Elections where more than one seat is disputed, such as for the membership in local legislatures, are done via plurality-at-large voting. For Sangguniang Panlalawigan seats, the Commission on Elections divides all provinces into at least 2 districts, while for Sangguniang Panlalawigan seats, the appropriation depends on the city charter (some are divided into districts, while others elect all councilors at-large), and for Sangguniang Bayan seats, all municipalities have eight councilors elected at-large, except for Pateros, which elects twelve, six in each district.

== Participating parties ==
- Parties that ran candidates in more than one province:

Party	English name	Name in the vernacular	Leader
Akbayan	Citizens' Action Party	Akbayan	Ronald Llamas
Aksyon	Democratic Action	Aksyon Demokratiko	Sonia Roco
CDP	Centrist Democratic Party of the Philippines	—N/a	Rufus Rodriguez
KBL	New Society Movement	Kilusang Bagong Lipunan	Bongbong Marcos
LDP	Struggle of Democratic Filipinos	Laban ng Demokratikong Pilipino	Edgardo Angara
Lakas	People Power-Christian Muslim Democrats	—N/a	Gloria Macapagal Arroyo
Liberal	Liberal Party	—N/a	Benigno Aquino III
Nacionalista	Nationalist Party	—N/a	Manuel Villar
NPC	Nationalist People's Coalition	—N/a	Faustino Dy
NUP	National Unity Party	—N/a	Pablo P. Garcia
PDP–Laban	Philippine Democratic Party-People's Power	Partido Demokratiko Pilipino-Lakas ng Bayan	Aquilino Pimentel III
PMP	Force of the Filipino Masses	Pwersa ng Masang Pilipino	Joseph Estrada
UNA	United Nationalist Alliance	—N/a	Jejomar Binay
Independent	Independent	—N/a	—N/a
Local parties	—N/a		Various
Ex officio members	—N/a		

== Regional elections ==
Elections were held for the governor, the vice governor and the Regional Legislative Assembly in the Autonomous Region in Muslim Mindanao.

== Provincial elections ==
The new province of Davao Occidental first voted for its provincial officials during this election.

=== Gubernatorial elections ===
The following are the results of the gubernatorial elections by party:

Party	Seats
Liberal Party	40
National Unity Party	9
Nationalist People's Coalition	9
Nacionalista Party	8
United Nationalist Alliance	3
Aksyon Demokratiko	1
Aksyon Magsasaka–Partido ng Tinig ng Masa	1
Bukidnon Paglaum	1
Kambilan	1
Padayon Pilipino	1
People's Champ Movement	1
United Negros Alliance	1
Independent	5
Total	81
Source: Commission on Elections

The following are the results of the gubernatorial elections by province:

Province	Elected governor	Party
Abra	Joy Bernos	NUP
Agusan del Norte	Angelica Amante	Liberal
Agusan del Sur	Adolph Edward Plaza	NUP
Aklan	Florencio Miraflores	Liberal
Albay	Al Francis Bichara	Nacionalista
Antique	Rhodora Cadiao	NUP
Apayao	Elias Bulut Jr.	Liberal
Aurora	Gerardo Noveras	NPC
Basilan	Hadjiman Hataman Salliman	Liberal
Bataan	Albert Garcia	NUP
Batanes	Marilou Cayco	Liberal
Batangas	Hermilando Mandanas	Independent
Benguet	Cresencio Pacalso	Independent
Biliran	Gerardo Espina Jr.	Liberal
Bohol	Edgar Chatto	Liberal
Bukidnon	Jose Maria Zubiri Jr.	BPP
Bulacan	Wilhelmino Sy-Alvarado	Liberal
Cagayan	Manuel Mamba	Liberal
Camarines Norte	Edgar Tallado	NPC
Camarines Sur	Miguel Luis Villafuerte	Nacionalista
Camiguin	Maria Luisa Romualdo	Liberal
Capiz	Antonio del Rosario	Liberal
Catanduanes	Joseph Cua	UNA
Cavite	Jesus Crispin Remulla	UNA
Cebu	Hilario Davide III	Liberal
Compostela Valley	Tyron Uy	Liberal
Cotabato	Emmylou Mendoza	Liberal
Davao del Norte	Antonio Rafael del Rosario	Liberal
Davao del Sur	Douglas Cagas	Nacionalista
Davao Occidental	Claude Bautista	NPC
Davao Oriental	Nelson Dayanghirang	Liberal
Dinagat Islands	Glenda Ecleo	UNA
Eastern Samar	Conrado Nicart Jr.	Liberal
Guimaras	Samuel Gumarin	Liberal
Ifugao	Pedro Mayam-o	Liberal
Ilocos Norte	Imee Marcos	Nacionalista
Ilocos Sur	Ryan Luis Singson	Nacionalista
Iloilo	Arthur Defensor Sr.	Liberal
Isabela	Bojie Dy	NPC
Kalinga	Jocel Baac	Liberal
La Union	Francisco Ortega III	Independent
Laguna	Ramil Hernandez	Nacionalista
Lanao del Norte	Imelda Dimaporo	Liberal
Lanao del Sur	Soraya Bedjora Adiong	Liberal
Leyte	Leopoldo Petilla	Liberal
Maguindanao	Esmael Mangudadatu	Liberal
Marinduque	Carmencita Reyes	Liberal
Masbate	Antonio Kho	Nacionalista
Misamis Occidental	Herminia Ramiro	NUP
Misamis Oriental	Yevgeny Emano	Padayon Pilipino
Mountain Province	Leonard Mayaen (Note: Leonard Mayaen died on March 31, 2016, but was later posthumously re-elected. Vice governor-elect Bonifacio Lacwasan, who took office as governor upon Mayaen's death, filled the vacancy.)	Independent
Negros Occidental	Alfredo Marañon	UNegA
Negros Oriental	Roel Degamo	NUP
Northern Samar	Jose Ong Jr.	NUP
Nueva Ecija	Czarina Umali	Liberal
Nueva Vizcaya	Carlos Padilla	Nacionalista
Occidental Mindoro	Mario Gene Mendiola	Liberal
Oriental Mindoro	Alfonso Umali Jr.	Liberal
Palawan	Jose Alvarez	Liberal
Pampanga	Lilia Pineda	Kambilan
Pangasinan	Amado Espino III	Aksyon
Quezon	David Suarez	NUP
Quirino	Junie Cua	Liberal
Rizal	Rebecca Ynares	NPC
Romblon	Eduardo Firmalo	Liberal
Samar	Sharee Ann Tan	NPC
Sarangani	Steve Solon	PCM
Siquijor	Zaldy Villa	Liberal
Sorsogon	Robert Rodrigueza	Liberal
South Cotabato	Daisy Avance Fuentes	NPC
Southern Leyte	Damian Mercado	Liberal
Sultan Kudarat	Pax Mangudadatu	AKMA–PTM
Sulu	Abdusakur Tan II	Liberal
Surigao del Norte	Sol Matugas	Liberal
Surigao del Sur	Vicente Pimentel Jr.	Liberal
Tarlac	Susan Yap	NPC
Tawi-Tawi	Rashidin Matba	NUP
Zambales	Amor Deloso	Independent
Zamboanga del Norte	Roberto Uy	Liberal
Zamboanga del Sur	Antonio Cerilles	NPC
Zamboanga Sibugay	Wilter Palma	Liberal

=== Vice gubernatorial elections ===
The following are the results of the vice gubernatorial elections by party:

Party	Seats
Liberal Party	39
National Unity Party	8
Nationalist People's Coalition	8
Nacionalista Party	6
United Nationalist Alliance	5
Lakas–CMD	2
Aksyon Demokratiko	1
Aksyon Magsasaka–Partido ng Tinig ng Masa	1
Bukidnon Paglaum	1
Laban ng Demokratikong Pilipino	1
People's Champ Movement	1
PDP–Laban	1
Partidong Pagbabago ng Palawan	1
Independent	6
Total	81
Source: Commission on Elections

The following are the results of the vice gubernatorial elections by province:

Province	Elected vice governor	Party
Abra	Ronald Balao-as	NUP
Agusan del Norte	Ramon Bungabong	Liberal
Agusan del Sur	Samuel Tortor	NUP
Aklan	Reynaldo Quimpo	Nacionalista
Albay	Harold Imperial	Liberal
Antique	Edgar Denosta	NUP
Apayao	Remy Albano	Liberal
Aurora	Rommel T. Angara	LDP
Basilan	Yusop Alano	NPC
Bataan	Tet Garcia	NUP
Batanes	Ronald Aguto	UNA
Batangas	Sofronio Ona Jr.	NPC
Benguet	Florence Tingbaoen	Liberal
Biliran	Eriberto Tubis Jr.	Liberal
Bohol	Dionisio Balite	PDP–Laban
Bukidnon	Rogelio Quiño	BPP
Bulacan	Daniel Fernando	Liberal
Cagayan	Melvin Vargas Jr.	UNA
Camarines Norte	Jonah Pedro Pimentel	NPC
Camarines Sur	Fortunato Peña	Liberal
Camiguin	James Ederango	Liberal
Capiz	Esteban Evan Contreras	Liberal
Catanduanes	Shirley Abundo	NPC
Cavite	Jolo Revilla	Lakas
Cebu	Agnes Magpale	Liberal
Compostela Valley	Manuel E. Zamora	Liberal
Cotabato	Gregorio Ipong	Independent
Davao del Norte	Alan Dujali	Independent
Davao del Sur	Aileen Almendras	NPC
Davao Occidental	Franklin Bautista	Liberal
Davao Oriental	Niño Sotero Uy Jr.	Liberal
Dinagat Islands	Benglen Ecleo	UNA
Eastern Samar	Marcelo Ferdinand Picardal	Liberal
Guimaras	John Edward Gando	Liberal
Ifugao	Jose Gullitiw	Independent
Ilocos Norte	Angelo Barba	Nacionalista
Ilocos Sur	Jerry Singson	Nacionalista
Iloilo	Christine Garin	NUP
Isabela	Tonypet Albano	UNA
Kalinga	James Edduba	Lakas
La Union	Aurelio Augusto Nisce	Liberal
Laguna	Katherine Agapay	Nacionalista
Lanao del Norte	Maria Cristina Atay	Liberal
Lanao del Sur	Mamintal Adiong Jr.	Liberal
Leyte	Carlo Loreto	Liberal
Maguindanao	Lester Sinsuat	Liberal
Marinduque	Romulo Bacorro	Liberal
Masbate	Jo Kristine Revil	NUP
Misamis Occidental	Aurora Virgina Almonte	Liberal
Misamis Oriental	Jose Mari Pelaez	UNA
Mountain Province	Bonifacio Lacwasan (Note: Vice governor-elect Bonifacio Lacwasan filled the vacancy in the governorship that occurred after Leonard Mayaen died on March 31, 2016, prior to being re-elected. Lacwasan had earlier taken office as governor upon Mayaen's death.)	Independent
Negros Occidental	Bong Lacson	NPC
Negros Oriental	Edward Mark Macias	Liberal
Northern Samar	Gary Lavin	NUP
Nueva Ecija	Jose Gay Padiernos	Liberal
Nueva Vizcaya	Epifanio Lamberto Galima	Nacionalista
Occidental Mindoro	Peter Alfaro	Liberal
Oriental Mindoro	Humerlito Dolor	Liberal
Palawan	Victorino Dennis Socrates	PPPL
Pampanga	Dennis Pineda	NPC
Pangasinan	Jose Calimlim Jr.	Aksyon
Quezon	Samuel Nantes	Liberal
Quirino	May Calaunan	Liberal
Rizal	Reynaldo San Juan Jr.	Liberal
Romblon	Jose Riano	Liberal
Samar	Stephen James Tan	Nacionalista
Sarangani	Elmer de Peralta	PCM
Siquijor	Mei Ling Quezon	Liberal
Sorsogon	Ma. Ester Hamor	Independent
South Cotabato	Vicente de Jesus	Liberal
Southern Leyte	Christopherson Yap	Liberal
Sultan Kudarat	Raden Sakaluran	AKMA–PTM
Sulu	Nurunisah Tan	Liberal
Surigao del Norte	Arturo Carlos Egay Jr.	Liberal
Surigao del Sur	Manuel Alameda Sr.	Liberal
Tarlac	Carlito David	NPC
Tawi-Tawi	Michail Ahaja	NUP
Zambales	Angelica Cheng	Independent
Zamboanga del Norte	Senen Angeles	Liberal
Zamboanga del Sur	Ace William Cerilles	Liberal
Zamboanga Sibugay	Eldwin Alibutdan	Liberal

=== Provincial board elections ===
The following are the results of the provincial board elections by party:

Party	Seats
Liberal Party	335
Nationalist People's Coalition	104
National Unity Party	69
Nacionalista Party	66
United Nationalist Alliance	54
People's Champ Movement	10
Aksyon Magsasaka–Partido ng Tinig ng Masa	9
Bukidnon Paglaum	9
Sulong Zambales Party	9
Kambilan	7
Partidong Pagbabago ng Palawan	7
PDP–Laban	6
Laban ng Demokratikong Pilipino	5
Padayon Pilipino	5
Kusog Baryohanon	4
Lakas–CMD	4
Aksyon Demokratiko	3
Kilusang Bagong Lipunan	3
Barug Alang sa Kauswagan ug Demokrasya	2
Akbayan	1
Bagong Lakas ng Nueva Ecija	1
Kusog Davao Oriental	1
One Cebu	1
Ugyon	1
Independent	60
Total	776
Source: Commission on Elections

The following are the results of the provincial board elections by province:

Province	Elected seats	Party	Seats won
Abra	8	Liberal	5
Abra	8	NUP	3
Agusan del Norte	8	Nacionalista	5
Agusan del Norte	8	Liberal	3
Agusan del Sur	10	NUP	10
Aklan	10	Liberal	7
Aklan	10	Nacionalista	1
Aklan	10	NPC	1
Aklan	10	UNA	1
Albay	10	Liberal	6
Albay	10	UNA	2
Albay	10	Independent	2
Antique	10	NUP	5
Antique	10	Liberal	3
Antique	10	UNA	1
Antique	10	Independent	1
Apayao	8	Liberal	4
Apayao	8	UNA	2
Apayao	8	NPC	1
Apayao	8	Independent	1
Aurora	8	LDP	5
Aurora	8	NPC	2
Aurora	8	Nacionalista	1
Basilan	8	Independent	8
Bataan	10	NUP	9
Bataan	10	Nacionalista	1
Batanes	6	Liberal	3
Batanes	6	UNA	2
Batanes	6	NPC	1
Batangas	12	Liberal	9
Batangas	12	UNA	1
Batangas	12	Independent	2
Benguet	10	NUP	5
Benguet	10	Liberal	3
Benguet	10	NPC	1
Benguet	10	Independent	1
Biliran	8	Liberal	4
Biliran	8	UNA	2
Biliran	8	Independent	2
Bohol	10	Liberal	7
Bohol	10	Nacionalista	1
Bohol	10	NPC	1
Bohol	10	PDP–Laban	1
Bukidnon	10	BPP	9
Bukidnon	10	Liberal	1
Bulacan	10	Liberal	7
Bulacan	10	NPC	3
Cagayan	10	NUP	3
Cagayan	10	Liberal	2
Cagayan	10	Nacionalista	2
Cagayan	10	UNA	2
Cagayan	10	NPC	1
Camarines Norte	10	Liberal	5
Camarines Norte	10	NPC	5
Camarines Sur	10	Nacionalista	6
Camarines Sur	10	Liberal	2
Camarines Sur	10	NPC	2
Camiguin	6	Liberal	6
Capiz	10	Liberal	8
Capiz	10	NUP	2
Catanduanes	8	NPC	5
Catanduanes	8	Liberal	1
Catanduanes	8	UNA	1
Catanduanes	8	Independent	1
Cavite	14	UNA	6
Cavite	14	NUP	3
Cavite	14	Lakas	2
Cavite	14	Liberal	2
Cavite	14	Independent	1
Cebu	14	Liberal	5
Cebu	14	Bakud	2
Cebu	14	Nacionalista	1
Cebu	14	NUP	1
Cebu	14	One Cebu	1
Cebu	14	Independent	4
Compostela Valley	10	Liberal	8
Compostela Valley	10	Aksyon	2
Cotabato	10	Liberal	4
Cotabato	10	PDP–Laban	1
Cotabato	10	Independent	5
Davao del Norte	10	KB	4
Davao del Norte	10	Liberal	4
Davao del Norte	10	Independent	2
Davao del Sur	10	NPC	5
Davao del Sur	10	Nacionalista	3
Davao del Sur	10	Liberal	2
Davao Occidental	8	NPC	7
Davao Occidental	8	Liberal	1
Davao Oriental	10	Liberal	8
Davao Oriental	10	KDO	1
Davao Oriental	10	Independent	1
Dinagat Islands	8	UNA	5
Dinagat Islands	8	Liberal	2
Dinagat Islands	8	Independent	1
Eastern Samar	10	Liberal	9
Eastern Samar	10	Nacionalista	1
Guimaras	8	Liberal	7
Guimaras	8	Independent	1
Ifugao	8	Liberal	4
Ifugao	8	Independent	4
Ilocos Norte	10	Nacionalista	9
Ilocos Norte	10	Liberal	1
Ilocos Sur	10	Nacionalista	7
Ilocos Sur	10	KBL	1
Ilocos Sur	10	Liberal	1
Ilocos Sur	10	Independent	1
Iloilo	10	Liberal	7
Iloilo	10	NPC	1
Iloilo	10	Ugyon	1
Iloilo	10	UNA	1
Isabela	10	NPC	6
Isabela	10	UNA	3
Isabela	10	Liberal	1
Kalinga	8	Liberal	3
Kalinga	8	NPC	2
Kalinga	8	KBL	1
Kalinga	8	Lakas	1
Kalinga	8	Nacionalista	1
La Union	10	NPC	5
La Union	10	Liberal	2
La Union	10	UNA	2
La Union	10	PDP–Laban	1
Laguna	10	UNA	4
Laguna	10	Nacionalista	3
Laguna	10	Liberal	2
Laguna	10	NUP	1
Lanao del Norte	10	Liberal	10
Lanao del Sur	10	Liberal	5
Lanao del Sur	10	UNA	3
Lanao del Sur	10	Independent	2
Leyte	10	Liberal	9
Leyte	10	NUP	1
Maguindanao	10	Liberal	9
Maguindanao	10	UNA	1
Marinduque	8	Liberal	4
Marinduque	8	UNA	1
Marinduque	8	Independent	3
Masbate	10	NPC	6
Masbate	10	NUP	3
Masbate	10	Liberal	1
Misamis Occidental	10	NUP	5
Misamis Occidental	10	Liberal	2
Misamis Occidental	10	Akbayan	1
Misamis Occidental	10	Independent	2
Misamis Oriental	10	Padayon Pilipino	5
Misamis Oriental	10	Liberal	4
Misamis Oriental	10	NUP	1
Mountain Province	8	Liberal	3
Mountain Province	8	Independent	5
Negros Occidental	12	NPC	6
Negros Occidental	12	NUP	3
Negros Occidental	12	Liberal	3
Negros Oriental	10	NPC	5
Negros Oriental	10	Liberal	3
Negros Oriental	10	NUP	1
Negros Oriental	10	UNA	1
Northern Samar	10	Liberal	5
Northern Samar	10	NUP	5
Nueva Ecija	10	Liberal	5
Nueva Ecija	10	UNA	3
Nueva Ecija	10	Balane	1
Nueva Ecija	10	NPC	1
Nueva Vizcaya	10	Nacionalista	6
Nueva Vizcaya	10	UNA	2
Nueva Vizcaya	10	Liberal	1
Nueva Vizcaya	10	Independent	1
Occidental Mindoro	10	Liberal	7
Occidental Mindoro	10	Lakas	1
Occidental Mindoro	10	Nacionalista	1
Occidental Mindoro	10	Independent	1
Oriental Mindoro	10	Liberal	8
Oriental Mindoro	10	NPC	2
Palawan	10	PPPL	7
Palawan	10	Liberal	3
Pampanga	10	Kambilan	7
Pampanga	10	Nacionalista	1
Pampanga	10	UNA	1
Pampanga	10	Independent	1
Pangasinan	12	NPC	5
Pangasinan	12	Liberal	5
Pangasinan	12	Aksyon	1
Pangasinan	12	KBL	1
Quezon	10	NUP	5
Quezon	10	Liberal	4
Quezon	10	UNA	1
Quirino	8	Liberal	6
Quirino	8	Independent	2
Rizal	10	NPC	8
Rizal	10	Liberal	1
Rizal	10	NUP	1
Romblon	8	Liberal	4
Romblon	8	Nacionalista	4
Samar	10	Liberal	5
Samar	10	NPC	2
Samar	10	Nacionalista	1
Samar	10	UNA	1
Samar	10	Independent	1
Sarangani	10	PCM	10
Siquijor	6	Liberal	6
Sorsogon	10	Liberal	4
Sorsogon	10	UNA	3
Sorsogon	10	NPC	2
Sorsogon	10	PDP–Laban	1
South Cotabato	10	NPC	6
South Cotabato	10	Liberal	4
Southern Leyte	8	Liberal	7
Southern Leyte	8	UNA	1
Sultan Kudarat	10	AKMA–PTM	9
Sultan Kudarat	10	Liberal	1
Sulu	10	Liberal	9
Sulu	10	PDP–Laban	1
Surigao del Norte	10	Liberal	7
Surigao del Norte	10	Nacionalista	2
Surigao del Norte	10	PDP–Laban	1
Surigao del Sur	10	Liberal	8
Surigao del Sur	10	NPC	1
Surigao del Sur	10	Independent	1
Tarlac	10	NPC	6
Tarlac	10	Liberal	2
Tarlac	10	Nacionalista	1
Tarlac	10	Independent	1
Tawi-Tawi	8	Liberal	5
Tawi-Tawi	8	NUP	2
Tawi-Tawi	8	Independent	1
Zambales	10	SZP	9
Zambales	10	Liberal	1
Zamboanga del Norte	10	Liberal	8
Zamboanga del Norte	10	Nacionalista	1
Zamboanga del Norte	10	UNA	1
Zamboanga del Sur	10	Liberal	5
Zamboanga del Sur	10	NPC	5
Zamboanga Sibugay	10	Nacionalista	7
Zamboanga Sibugay	10	Liberal	2
Zamboanga Sibugay	10	Independent	1

== City and municipal elections ==
=== Mayoral elections ===
The following are the results of the mayoral elections in highly urbanized and independent component cities and independent municipalities by party:

Party	Seats
Liberal Party	17
Nationalist People's Coalition	5
Nacionalista Party	4
United Nationalist Alliance	3
Hugpong sa Tawong Lungsod	1
National Unity Party	1
Partido Abe Kapampangan	1
Partido Navoteño	1
People's Champ Movement	1
Pwersa ng Masang Pilipino	1
Independent	2
Total	37
Source: Commission on Elections

The following are the results of the mayoral elections in highly urbanized and independent component cities and independent municipalities:

City/Municipality	Elected mayor	Party
Angeles City	Edgardo Pamintuan Sr.	PAK
Bacolod	Evelio Leonardia	Liberal
Baguio	Mauricio Domogan	UNA
Butuan	Ronnie Vicente Lagnada	NUP
Cagayan de Oro	Oscar Moreno	Liberal
Caloocan	Oscar Malapitan	Nacionalista
Cebu City	Tomas Osmeña	Liberal
Cotabato City	Japal Guiani Jr.	NPC
Dagupan	Belen Fernandez	Liberal
Davao City	Sara Duterte	HTL
General Santos	Ronnel Rivera	PCM
Iligan	Celso Regencia	NPC
Iloilo City	Jed Patrick Mabilog	Liberal
Lapu-Lapu City	Paz Radaza	Liberal
Las Piñas	Imelda Aguilar	Nacionalista
Lucena	Roderick Alcala	Liberal
Makati	Abigail Binay	UNA
Malabon	Antolin Oreta III	Liberal
Mandaluyong	Carmelita Abalos	UNA
Mandaue	Luigi Quisumbing	Liberal
Manila	Joseph Estrada	PMP
Marikina	Marcelino Teodoro	NPC
Muntinlupa	Jaime Fresnedi	Liberal
Naga	John Bongat	Liberal
Navotas	John Rey Tiangco	Navoteño
Olongapo	Rolen Paulino	Liberal
Ormoc	Richard Gomez	NPC
Parañaque	Edwin Olivarez	Liberal
Pasay	Antonino Calixto	Liberal
Pasig	Robert Eusebio	Nacionalista
Pateros	Ike Ponce	Independent
Puerto Princesa	Lucilo Bayron	NPC
Quezon City	Herbert Bautista	Liberal
San Juan	Guia Gomez	Independent
Santiago	Joseph Tan	Liberal
Taguig	Lani Cayetano	Nacionalista
Valenzuela	Rex Gatchalian	NPC
Zamboanga City	Beng Climaco	Liberal

=== Vice mayoral elections ===
The following are the results of the vice mayoral elections in highly urbanized and independent component cities and independent municipalities by party:

Party	Seats
Liberal Party	13
Nacionalista Party	6
Nationalist People's Coalition	5
United Nationalist Alliance	4
Pwersa ng Masang Pilipino	2
Asenso Manileño	1
Hugpong sa Tawong Lungsod	1
National Unity Party	1
Partido Abe Kapampangan	1
Partido Navoteño	1
People's Champ Movement	1
Independent	1
Total	37
Source: Commission on Elections

The following are the results of the vice mayoral elections in highly urbanized and independent component cities and independent municipalities:

City/Municipality	Elected vice mayor	Party
Angeles City	Bryan Matthew Nepomuceno	PAK
Bacolod	El Cid Familiaran	Liberal
Baguio	Edison Bilog	NPC
Butuan	Jose Aquino II	NUP
Cagayan de Oro	Raineir Joaquin Uy	Liberal
Caloocan	Luis Macario Asistio	PMP
Cebu City	Edgardo Labella	UNA
Cotabato City	Cynthia Guiani-Sayadi	NPC
Dagupan	Marc Brian Lim	Nacionalista
Davao City	Paolo Duterte	HTL
General Santos	Shirlyn Bañas-Nograles	PCM
Iligan	Jemar Vera Cruz	NPC
Iloilo City	Jose Espinosa III	Nacionalista
Lapu-Lapu City	Marcial Ycong	Liberal
Las Piñas	Luis Bustamante	Nacionalista
Lucena	Erwin Sustento	UNA
Makati	Monique Lagdameo	UNA
Malabon	Jeannie Sandoval	Nacionalista
Mandaluyong	Antonio Suva Jr.	UNA
Mandaue	Carlo Pontico Fortuna	Liberal
Manila	Honey Lacuna	Asenso Manileño
Marikina	Jose Fabian Cadiz	Liberal
Muntinlupa	Celso Dioko	Liberal
Naga	Nelson Legacion	Liberal
Navotas	Clint Geronimo	Navoteño
Olongapo	Aquilino Cortez Jr.	Liberal
Ormoc	Leo Carmelo Locsin Jr.	NPC
Parañaque	Jose Enrico Golez	Liberal
Pasay	Noel del Rosario	Liberal
Pasig	Iyo Bernardo	Liberal
Pateros	Gerald German	Independent
Puerto Princesa	Luis Marcaida III	NPC
Quezon City	Joy Belmonte	Liberal
San Juan	Jana Ejercito	PMP
Santiago	Alvin Abaya	Nacionalista
Taguig	Ading Cruz	Nacionalista
Valenzuela	Lorie Natividad-Borja	NPC
Zamboanga City	Cesar Iturralde	Liberal

=== City and municipal council elections ===
The following are the results of the city and municipal council elections in highly urbanized and independent component cities and independent municipalities by party:

Party	Seats
Liberal Party	196
Nationalist People's Coalition	68
United Nationalist Alliance	57
Nacionalista Party	49
Asenso Manileño	24
Hugpong sa Tawong Lungsod	20
Partido Navoteño	11
National Unity Party	10
People's Champ Movement	9
Laban ng Demokratikong Pilipino	7
Partido Abe Kapampangan	7
PDP–Laban	7
Padayon Pilipino	5
Pwersa ng Masang Pilipino	4
Achievers with Integrity Movement	3
One Cebu	3
Centrist Democratic Party	2
Aksyon Demokratiko	1
Kabalikat ng Bayan sa Kaunlaran	1
Lingap Lugud	1
Independent	41
Total	526
Source: Commission on Elections

The following are the results of the city and municipal council elections in highly urbanized and independent component cities and independent municipalities:

City/municipality	Elected seats	Party	Seats won
Angeles City	10	PAK	7
Angeles City	10	Lingap Lugud	1
Angeles City	10	PDP–Laban	1
Angeles City	10	Independent	1
Bacolod	12	NPC	7
Bacolod	12	Liberal	2
Bacolod	12	Nacionalista	2
Bacolod	12	Independent	1
Baguio	12	UNA	6
Baguio	12	Liberal	4
Baguio	12	NPC	1
Baguio	12	Independent	1
Butuan	10	NUP	8
Butuan	10	Liberal	2
Cagayan de Oro	16	Liberal	6
Cagayan de Oro	16	Padayon Pilipino	5
Cagayan de Oro	16	UNA	3
Cagayan de Oro	16	CDP	2
Caloocan	12	UNA	7
Caloocan	12	Liberal	5
Cebu City	16	UNA	10
Cebu City	16	Liberal	6
Cotabato City	10	NPC	6
Cotabato City	10	Liberal	4
Dagupan	10	Liberal	6
Dagupan	10	Nacionalista	2
Dagupan	10	NPC	1
Dagupan	10	Independent	1
Davao City	24	HTL	20
Davao City	24	PDP–Laban	2
Davao City	24	NPC	1
Davao City	24	NUP	1
General Santos	12	PCM	9
General Santos	12	AIM	3
Iligan	12	NPC	10
Iligan	12	Liberal	2
Iloilo City	12	Liberal	10
Iloilo City	12	UNA	2
Lapu-Lapu City	12	Liberal	12
Las Piñas	12	Nacionalista	12
Lucena	10	Liberal	8
Lucena	10	UNA	2
Makati	16	UNA	14
Makati	16	Liberal	2
Malabon	12	Liberal	7
Malabon	12	Nacionalista	2
Malabon	12	NPC	2
Malabon	12	PMP	1
Mandaluyong	12	NPC	4
Mandaluyong	12	Liberal	3
Mandaluyong	12	UNA	3
Mandaluyong	12	Independent	2
Mandaue	10	Liberal	7
Mandaue	10	One Cebu	3
Manila	36	Asenso Manileño	24
Manila	36	Liberal	3
Manila	36	UNA	3
Manila	36	Kabaka	1
Manila	36	Nacionalista	1
Manila	36	PMP	1
Manila	36	Independent	3
Marikina	16	Liberal	12
Marikina	16	NPC	4
Muntinlupa	16	Liberal	14
Muntinlupa	16	UNA	2
Naga	10	Liberal	10
Navotas	12	Navoteño	11
Navotas	12	Independent	1
Olongapo	10	Liberal	7
Olongapo	10	Aksyon	1
Olongapo	10	Independent	2
Ormoc	10	NPC	8
Ormoc	10	Liberal	2
Parañaque	16	Liberal	12
Parañaque	16	NPC	1
Parañaque	16	PDP–Laban	1
Parañaque	16	PMP	1
Parañaque	16	Independent	1
Pasay	12	Liberal	10
Pasay	12	NPC	1
Pasay	12	PMP	1
Pasig	12	PDP–Laban	2
Pasig	12	Nacionalista	1
Pasig	12	Independent	9
Pateros	12	Nacionalista	5
Pateros	12	Independent	7
Puerto Princesa	10	NPC	10
Quezon City	36	Liberal	27
Quezon City	36	NPC	4
Quezon City	36	Nacionalista	2
Quezon City	36	NUP	1
Quezon City	36	UNA	1
Quezon City	36	Independent	1
San Juan	12	Nacionalista	4
San Juan	12	Independent	8
Santiago	10	Liberal	5
Santiago	10	Nacionalista	2
Santiago	10	Independent	3
Taguig	16	Nacionalista	16
Valenzuela	12	NPC	8
Valenzuela	12	Liberal	2
Valenzuela	12	PDP–Laban	1
Valenzuela	12	UNA	1
Zamboanga City	16	LDP	7
Zamboanga City	16	Liberal	6
Zamboanga City	16	UNA	3

== Barangay elections ==
Barangay elections were supposedly to be held in October 2016 to end the election cycle, but were postponed by Congress to October 2017. The officials elected in 2013 will continue to serve up to 2017. By March 2017, Congress then postponed the election anew, this time to May 2018.

The barangay and Sangguniang Kabataan (SK) chairmen in a city or municipality will elect among themselves a representative each to sit in the town's Sangguniang Bayan (municipal council) or city's Sangguniang Panlungsod (city council), as the case may be. The municipal and city representatives of the barangay and SK chairmen, and the city and municipal councilors in every province then elect among themselves a representative each to the Sangguniang Panlalawigan (provincial board). The provincial and city (which are independent from a province) representatives of the SK chairmen will then elect themselves a president that shall sit as a member of the National Youth Commission. The same is true for the barangay chairmen, who shall be the president of the Liga ng mga Barangay (Association of Villages), and the councilors, who will be the president of the Philippine Councilors League.
