= 2025 Mountain Province local elections =

Local elections in the Philippines

- May 12, 2025
- Registered: 121,647
- Turnout: 81.68%
- Gubernatorial election
- Turnout: 80.09%
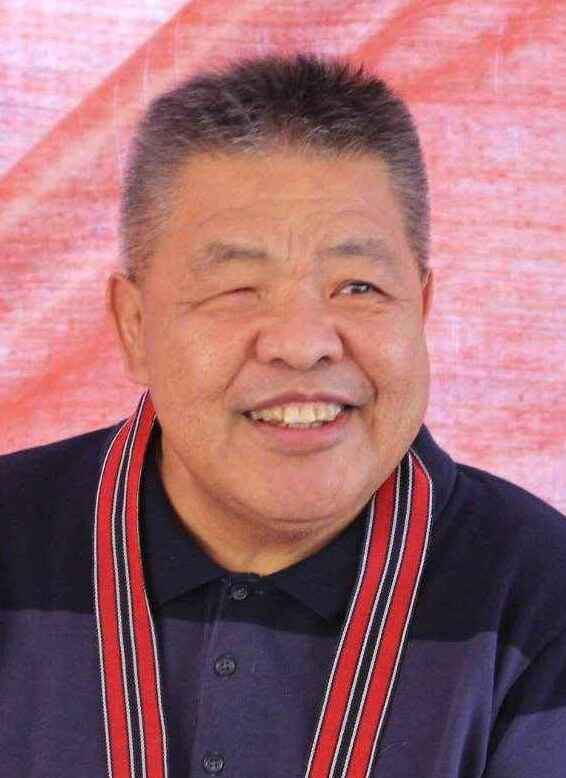

Candidate	Bonifacio Lacwasan Jr.	Eduardo Latawan Jr.
Party	PFP	Independent
Popular vote	50,666	46,685
Percentage	52.04%	47.96%
Governor before election
Bonifacio Lacwasan Jr.
PDP–Laban
Elected Governor
Bonifacio Lacwasan Jr.
PFP
- Vice gubernatorial election
- Turnout: 75.00%

Candidate	Jet Dominguez	Francis Tauli
Party	Independent	PFP
Popular vote	46,633	37,760
Percentage	51.11%	41.38%
Vice governor before election
Francis Tauli
PDP–Laban
Elected Vice governor
Jet Dominguez
Independent

Local elections were held in Mountain Province on May 12, 2025, as part of the 2025 Philippine general election. Voters in Mountain Province, a landlocked province in the Cordillera Administrative Region (CAR), elected local officials including the provincial governor, vice governor, 10 of 14 members of the Mountain Province Provincial Board, and a congressman to represent the province's at-large district at the House of Representatives.

Incumbent Governor Bonifacio Lacwasan successfully won re-election to a third term, defeating former Sagada mayor Eduardo Latawan Jr. by a narrow margin of 4.08 Percentage points, receiving 52.04% of the vote against Latawan's 47.96%. In the vice gubernatorial race, however, incumbent Vice Governor Francis Tauli was unseated by independent candidate Jet Dominguez, who secured 51.11% of the vote.

This marked the first election after the province was reclassification as a 2nd class province in January 2025, expanding the Mountain Province Provincial Board to 14 members, 10 of whom are elected. The Partido Federal ng Pilipinas (PFP) emerged as the largest party in the provincial board, winning four of the ten elected seats, followed by the Nacionalista Party with three, Laban ng Demokratikong Pilipino (LDP) with one, and independent candidates taking the remaining two.

== Background ==
Heading into the 2025 elections, Lacwasan, who had originally assumed the office on March 31, 2016, following the death of Governor Leonard Mayaen. As the vice governor at the time of Mayaen's death, Lacwasan was sworn in on April 5, 2016, and served the remainder of Mayaen's unexpired term. Lacwasan subsequently ran for the governorship in his own right and won in the 2019 elections, then secured re-election in the 2022 elections under PDP–Laban. Ahead of the 2025 cycle, he switched his party affiliation to the PFP. The 2025 elections represented his third and constitutionally final consecutive term as governor.

Incumbent Vice Governor Francis Tauli, who had first acceded to the post in 2016 by succession as the most senior member of the Sangguniang Panlalawigan at the time Lacwasan moved up to the governorship. Tauli subsequently won the vice governorship in the 2019 elections, receiving 29,020 votes. He was re-elected in the 2022 elections, continuing to serve alongside Governor Lacwasan. Like Lacwasan, the 2025 race would be Tauli's third and final consecutive term bid.

On December 6, 2024, the Commission on Elections issued a resolution increasing the number of provincial board seats in 21 provinces after the Department of Finance updated their income classifications. Under the Local Government Code, first and second-class provinces are entitled to 10 provincial board members, while third and fourth-class provinces have eight. As Mountain Province was upgraded from 4th class to 2nd class, it gained one additional seat in each of its two provincial districts, bringing the total number of elected regular board members from eight to ten, and expanding the full board from 12 to 14 members inclusive of ex officio and reserved seats.

== Electoral system ==
The Governor and Vice Governor of Mountain Province are each elected separately through a province-wide plurality voting system, meaning the candidate with the most votes wins regardless of whether they secure a majority. Both positions carry a three-year term, and incumbents are barred from seeking a fourth consecutive term. The Governor serves as the chief executive of the province, while the Vice Governor serves as the presiding officer of the Sangguniang Panlalawigan, voting only to break ties.

Members of the Sangguniang Panlalawigan are elected through plurality-at-large voting. The province is divided into two districts, each electing five members. A voter votes for up to five names per district, with the top five candidates in each district being elected.

The lone congressional district of Mountain Province elects a single representative to the House of Representatives of the Philippines through a province-wide plurality vote, also subject to a three-consecutive-term limit.

== Provincial offices ==
=== Governor ===
Municipality results Lacwasan: 50-60% 60-70%; Latawan: 50-60% 60-70%

Barangay results Lacwasan: 50-60% 60-70% 70-80% 80-90%; Latawan: 50-60% 60-70% 70-80% 80-90%

Municipality flips PFP: PFP Gain; Independent: Independent Gain

Incumbent Governor Bonifacio Lacwasan Jr. sought a third and final consecutive term, facing independent candidate Eduardo Latawan Jr. in a two-way race. Lacwasan successfully defended his position, garnering 50,666 votes to Latawan's 46,685 votes.

==== Candidates ====
- Bonifacio Lacwasan Jr. (PFP), incumbent governor since 2016 (Note: Served as acting governor from 2016 to 2019)
- Eduardo Latawan Jr. (Independent), former mayor of Sagada

==== Results ====
2025 Mountain Province gubernatorial election
Party	Candidate	Votes	%	±%
PFP	Bonifacio Lacwasan Jr.	50,666	52.04%	−37.26
Independent	Eduardo Latawan Jr.	46,685	47.96%	N/A
Total votes		97,351	100.00%	N/A

===== By municipality =====
Results by municipality
Municipality	Bonficacio Lacwasan Jr PFP		Eduardo Latawan Jr. Indepenent		Margin		Total
Municipality	#	%	#	%	#	%	Total
Barlig	1,665	47.61%	1,832	52.39%	-167	-4.78%	3,497
Bauko	11,822	58.70%	8,317	41.30%	3,505	17.40%	20,139
Besao	2,486	54.36%	2,087	45.64%	399	8.73%	4,573
Bontoc	6,580	46.20%	7,663	53.80%	-1,083	-7.60%	14,243
Natonin	3,124	46.00%	3,667	54.00%	-543	-8.00%	6,791
Paracelis	9,091	50.15%	9,035	49.85%	56	0.31%	18,126
Sabangan	4,351	64.44%	2,401	35.56%	1,950	28.88%	6,752
Sadanga	2,398	44.72%	2,964	55.28%	-566	-10.56%	5,362
Sagada	2,944	38.83%	4,637	61.17%	-1,693	-22.33%	7,581
Tadian	6,205	60.32%	4,082	39.68%	2,123	20.64%	10,287
Totals	50,666	52.04%	46,685	47.96%	3,981	4.09%	97,351

=== Vice governor ===
Municipality results Dominguez: 40-50% 50-60% 60-70%; Tauli: 50-60% 60-70%

Barangay results Dominguez: 30-40% 40-50% 50-60% 60-70% 70-80%; Tauli: 40-50% 50-60% 60-70% 70-80% 80-90%; Miyo: 40%-50%

Municipality flips Independent: Independent Gain; PFP: PFP Gain

Incumbent Vice Governor Francis Tauli ran for a third consecutive term but was defeated by Jose "Jet" Dominguez. Dominguez placed first in the five-way race with 46,633 votes, while Tauli finished second. The remaining three independent candidates accounted for the rest of the vote.

==== Candidates ====
- Jet Dominguez (Independent), candidate for provincial board member in 2019
- Francis Tauli (PFP), incumbent vice governor since 2019
- Miyo Carlos (Independent)
- Albert Paday-Os (Independent), candidate for governor in 2022
- Cleto Chacapna Jr. (Independent), candidate for provincial board member in 2022

==== Results ====
2025 Mountain Province vice gubernatorial election
Party	Candidate	Votes	%	±%
Independent	Jet Dominguez	46,633	51.11%	N/A
PFP	Francis Tauli	37,760	41.38%	−9.90
Independent	Miyo Carlos	4,345	4.76%	N/A
Independent	Albert Paday-Os	1,465	1.61%	N/A
Independent	Cleto Chacapna Jr.	1,038	1.14%	N/A
Total votes		91,241	100.00%	N/A

===== By municipality =====
Results by municipality
Municipality	Jet Dominguez Independent		Francis Tauli PFP		Other candidates		Margin		Total
Municipality	#	%	#	%	#	%	#	%	Total
Barlig	1,744	54.13%	993	30.82%	485	15.05%	751	23.31%	3,222
Bauko	10,207	52.97%	8,427	43.73%	635	3.30%	1,780	9.24%	19,269
Besao	1,195	28.03%	2,970	69.67%	98	2.30%	-1,775	-41.64%	4,263
Bontoc	8,223	61.08%	4,871	36.18%	368	2.73%	3,352	24.90%	13,462
Natonin	3,731	60.56%	1,696	27.53%	734	11.91%	2,035	33.03%	6,161
Paracelis	8,097	49.00%	4,666	28.24%	3,762	22.77%	3,431	20.76%	16,525
Sabangan	3,300	52.68%	2,775	44.30%	189	3.02%	525	8.38%	6,264
Sadanga	3,340	65.50%	1,651	32.38%	108	2.12%	1,689	33.12%	5,099
Sagada	2,526	34.80%	4,565	62.89%	168	2.31%	-2,039	-28.09%	7,259
Tadian	4,270	43.94%	5,146	52.96%	301	3.10%	-876	-9.02%	9,717
Totals	46,633	51.11%	37,760	41.38%	6,848	7.51%	8,873	9.72%	91,241

== Provincial board ==
The provincial board elections were the first held under the province's expanded composition. All six of Governor Lacwasan's allied board candidates were re-elected, while the Latawan ticket earned three seats, and the final elective spot went to an independent candidate from the Dominguez ticket. Overall, PFP emerged as the largest party among elected board members with four seats, followed by the Nacionalista Party with three, LDP with one, and two independents.

=== Results ===
2025 Mountain province provincial board election
Party	Votes	Percentage	Seats	Seat change
Nacionalista	133,824	35.85%	3	▲1
Independents	110,659	29.64%	2	▲1
PFP	90,642	24.28%	4	New
LDP	20,282	5.43%	1	Steady
KANP	17,885	4.79%	0	New
Totals	373,292	100.00%	10	—

==== Results summary by district ====
† - Incumbent not seeking re-election
‡ - Incumbent term-limited

Districts	Incumbents	Party	Elected board members	Party
1st	Ezra Gomez	LDP	Roy Gammonac	Nacionalista
1st	Joshua Fronda	PDP–Laban	Federico Onsat	PFP
1st	Federico Onsat	PDP–Laban	Ezra Gomez	LDP
1st	Cariño Tamang†	Nacionalista	Joshua Fronda	PFP
1st	New seat		Janice Barillo	Nacionalista
2nd	Johnson Bantog II	Independent	Jowee Dominguez	Independent
2nd	Ricardo Masidong Jr.	Nacionalista	Sally Banaken-Ullalim	Independent
2nd	Henry Bastian Jr.	PDP–Laban	Ricardo Masidong Jr.	PFP
2nd	Donato Danglose‡	PDP–Laban	Johnson Bantog II	PFP
2nd	New seat		Henry Bastian Jr.	Nacionalista

==== 1st district ====
2025 Mountain Province's 1st district provincial board election (Note: Percentages calculated using the formula: (candidate vote / voters who actually voted) x 100)
Party	Candidate	Votes	%
Nacionalista	Roy Gammonac	27,734	56.44%
PFP	Federico Onsat	22,301	45.39%
LDP	Ezra Gomez	20,282	41.28%
PFP	Joshua Fronda	20,220	41.15%
Nacionalista	Janice Barillo	19,451	39.59%
KANP	Mateo Chiyawan	17,885	36.40%
Independent	Tancio Miranda	15,053	30.64%
Nacionalista	Jose Biangalen	14,147	28.79%
Independent	Maximillian Claver	11,250	22.90%
Nacionalista	John Pelew	10,841	22.06%
Independent	Vidastos Focao	5,066	10.31%
Total votes		184,230	100.00%

==== 2nd district ====
2025 Mountain Province's 2nd district provincial board election
Party	Candidate	Votes	%
Independent	Jowee Dominguez	28,507	56.76%
Independent	Sally Banaken-Ullalim	25,035	49.84%
PFP	Ricardo Masidong Jr.	24,261	48.30%
PFP	Johnson Bantog II	23,860	47.50%
Nacionalista	Henry Bastian Jr.	21,947	43.69%
Nacionalista	Bartolo Badecao	21,521	42.85%
Nacionalista	Anselmo Andayan	18,183	36.20%
Independent	Andres Sapdoy	10,895	21.69%
Independent	Jimmy Cajigan	6,134	12.21%
Independent	Akay Manodon	5,780	11.51%
Independent	Perfecto Igid	2,939	5.85%
Total votes		189,062	100.00%

== House of Representatives ==
Party gains/holds Nacionalista: Nacionalista Hold

District results Nacionalista: 90-100%

Municipality results Nacionalista: 90-100%

Incumbent Representative Maximo Dalog Jr. ran for re-election in the lone congressional district of Mountain Province. Running unopposed, Dalog won a third consecutive term in Congress.

=== Candidates ===
- Maximo Dalog Jr. (Nacionalista), incumbent representative since 2019

=== Results ===
2025 Philippine House of Representatives election in Mountain Province's lone congressional district
Party	Candidate	Votes	%	±%
Nacionalista	Maximo Dalog Jr.	85,006	100.00%	+43.91
Total votes		85,006	100.00%	N/A
