= 2013 Philippine House of Representatives elections in the Cordillera Administrative Region =

Elections were held in the Cordillera Administrative Region for seats in the House of Representatives of the Philippines on May 13, 2013.

The candidate with the most votes won that district's seat for the 16th Congress of the Philippines.

== Summary ==
Party	Popular vote	%	Seats won	Change
Liberal			5	
NPC			1	
Nacionalista			0	
NUP			0	
UNA			0	
Independent			1	
Valid votes				
Invalid votes				
Turnout				
Registered voters	462,659			

== Abra ==
Joy Bernos is the incumbent. Her main opponent is vice governor Rolando Somera.

Candidate	Party	Votes	%
Joy Bernos (incumbent)	Liberal Party	55,323	64.79
Rolando Somera	Nacionalista Party	19,116	22.39
Hans Roger Luna	Independent	10,952	12.83
Total		85,391	100.00
Liberal Party hold			

== Apayao ==
Eleanor Begtang is the incumbent.

Candidate	Party	Votes	%
Eleanor Begtang (incumbent)	Nationalist People's Coalition	35,636	92.28
Ambaro Sagle	United Nationalist Alliance	2,980	7.72
Total		38,616	100.00
Nationalist People's Coalition hold			

== Baguio ==
Bernardo Vergara is the incumbent. His main opponents are businessman Mark Go and city councilor Nicasio Aliping Jr.

Candidate	Party	Votes	%
Nicasio Aliping Jr.	Independent	33,402	38.40
Mark Go	Liberal Party	31,529	36.25
Bernardo Vergara (incumbent)	United Nationalist Alliance	20,902	24.03
Miguel Arvisu	Independent	576	0.66
Richard Zarate	Independent	478	0.55
Roam Manuel	Independent	89	0.10
Total		86,976	100.00
Independent gain from United Nationalist Alliance			

== Benguet ==
Ronald Cosalan is the incumbent. His main opponent is vice governor Crescencio Pacalso.

Candidate	Party	Votes	%
Ronald Cosalan (incumbent)	Liberal Party	56,494	55.44
Crescencio Pacalso	National Unity Party	45,070	44.23
Munar Renan	Independent	341	0.33
Total		101,905	100.00
Liberal Party hold			

== Ifugao ==
Teddy Baguilat is the incumbent. His opponent is former representative Solomon Chungalao.

Candidate	Party	Votes	%
Teddy Baguilat (incumbent)	Liberal Party	43,751	51.22
Solomon Chungalao	Independent	41,664	48.78
Total		85,415	100.00
Liberal Party hold			

== Kalinga ==
Manuel Agyao is the incumbent.

Candidate	Party	Votes	%
Manuel Agyao (incumbent)	Liberal Party	46,930	67.14
Macario Duguiang	United Nationalist Alliance	22,968	32.86
Total		69,898	100.00
Liberal Party hold			

== Mountain Province ==
Maximo Dalog Jr. is the incumbent. He will be challenged by former DPWH assistant secretary Roy Manao and Jupiter Dominguez.

Candidate	Party	Votes	%
Maximo Dalog Jr.(incumbent)	Liberal Party	32,597	43.15
Jupiter Dominguez	United Nationalist Alliance	29,218	38.68
Roy Manao	Nationalist People's Coalition	13,720	18.16
Total		75,535	100.00
Liberal Party hold			
