= Baguio General Hospital =

Government hospital in Baguio, Philippines

Baguio General Hospital and Medical Center

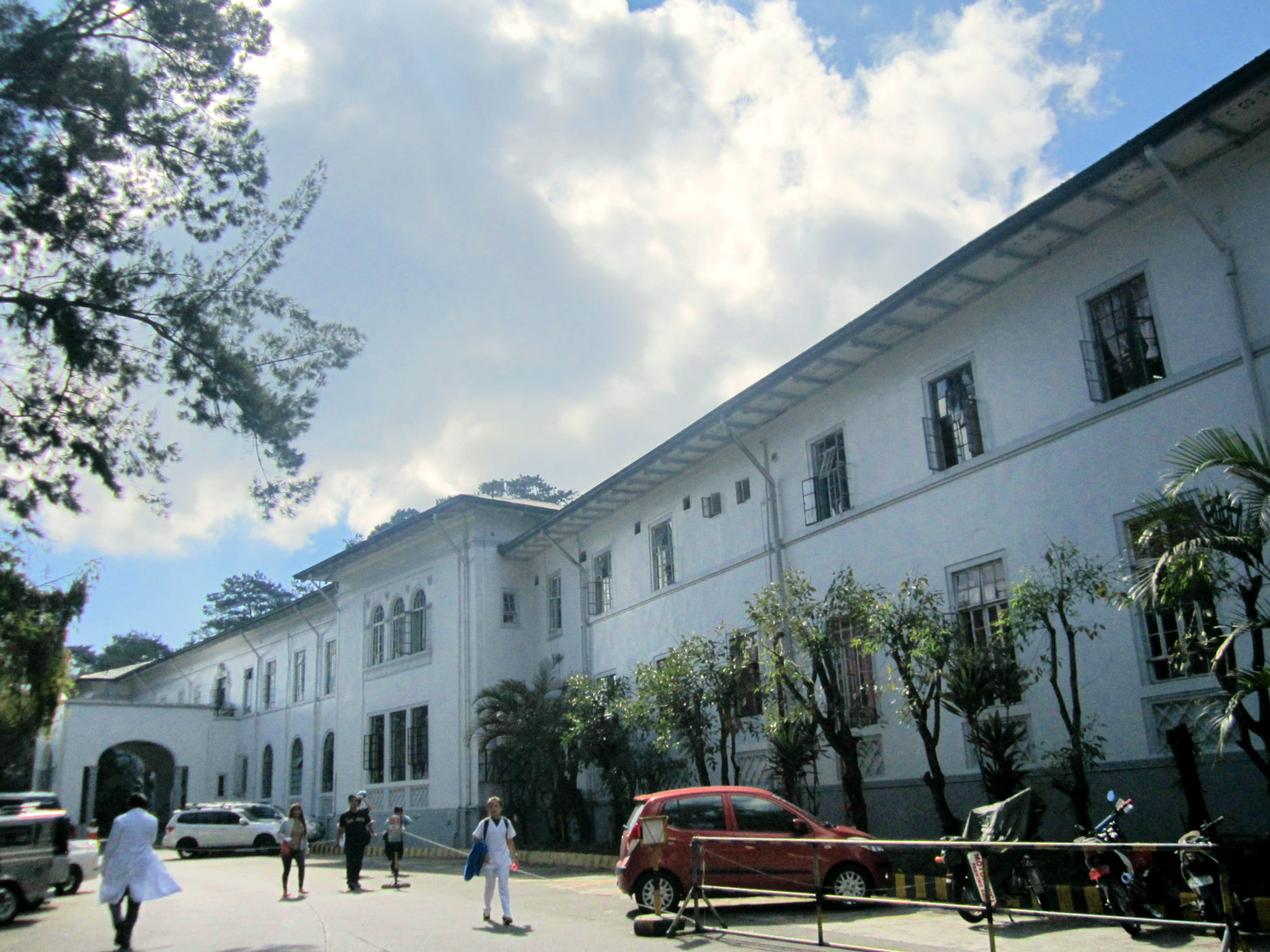

Geography
- Location: BGH Rotunda, Kennon Road, Baguio, Cordillera Administrative Region, Philippines
- Coordinates: 16.4011°N 120.5960°E

Organization
- Type: Government, charity

Services
- Standards: ISO 9001:2015
- Emergency department: 24/7 available with specialist and sub-specialist facilities
- Beds: 1500

History
- Founded: February 3, 1902; 124 years ago

Links
- Website: www.bghmc.doh.gov.ph
- Lists: Hospitals in the Philippines

Baguio General Hospital and Medical Center (BGHMC), also known as Baguio General Hospital (BGH), is a hospital in Baguio, Philippines. It is the largest government funded tertiary hospital in the Northern Luzon Region.

== History ==
The hospital was pioneered by American physician Dr. Eugene Stafford on February 3, 1902 as an eight-bed sanatorium at the area where the present-day Baguio office of Commission of Elections stands. It transferred to its current area in 1907 when their previous area was converted into the Pines Hotel. The sanatorium grew into a hospital and was named as Baguio Hospital in 1907 and then to Baguio General Hospital in 1937. During the onset of World War II, the hospital was seized by Japanese forces for their own use on 1944 and the hospital staff transferred to the Saint Louis High School building located behind the Baguio Cathedral to continue to serve patients despite the bombings by the advancing American forces. The site of the Baguio General Hospital encountered heavy artillery fire and bombing in 1945 with the main hospital building sustaining heavy damage. The former hospital staff regrouped and temporarily reopened the hospital at the Paules Frates La Salle compound at Legarda Road. Reconstruction efforts for the hospital started in September 1945 with the aid of the United States of America under the Philippine Rehabilitation Act of 1946 and was completed in 1948.

In 1961, following accreditation by the Philippine Medical Association and Philippine College of Surgeons, it started as a training center with residency programs for all branches of medicine and remains so until today training residents, consultants, as well as interns and Medical/allied health science students of various universities around the country. In 1981, the name of the hospital was changed to Dr. Efraim C. Montemayor Medical Center in honor of Dr. Efraim C. Montemayor who became the Chief of the hospital in 1970. It was eventually renamed to Baguio General Hospital and Medical Center in November 1989. The hospital was not safe from the 1990 Luzon earthquake which caused major damages to several hospital buildings which caused some to be demolished.

On May 7, 1998, BGHMC's bed capacity was increased from 400 to 500 beds under Republic Act 8634. In 2006, President Gloria Macapagal Arroyo and Senator Dr. Juan Flavier inaugurated the five-story Juan Flavier Building which would contain non-cutting departments such as internal medicine, pediatrics, radiology, and the emergency room. On March 16, 2009, the new Infectious Disease building was inaugurated which would also house the psychiatry outpatient department and drug rehabilitation unit.

== Recent Developments ==
In 2015, BGHMC started upgrading their facilities with Flavier building planned for a P50 million upgrade. In January 2017, BGHMC was certified as an ISO 9001:2015 institution. In April 2017, BGHMC opened its new Cancer Institute as part of the reform program of the Department of Health. On October 3, 2018, President of the Philippines Rodrigo Duterte signed into law Republic Act 11084 which increased the bed capacity of BGHMC from 500 to 800. Baguio Representative Mark Go filed House Bill 8782 on February 20, 2021, which would allow BGHMC to further increase its bed capacity from 800 to 1500 which got signed into law on June 29, 2022, as Republic Act 11889.

BGHMC is currently embarking on a major expansion of its services. These projects include a multi-specialty center worth P512 million that would contain an 8-story heart center, a six-story brain center, a kidney center and a lung center, a six-story trauma center worth P167 million, a psychiatric building worth P167 million, and two multi-story parking structures. Alongside the new structures is the expansion and renovation of the Infectious Disease building which would host a Polymerase chain reaction (PCR) laboratory and isolation rooms for MERS COV patients and the completion of the out-patient drug treatment and rehabilitation unit.

In July 2024, Mayor Benjamin Magalong asked Secretary Teodoro Herbosa to inquire into BGHMC's sub-standard Trauma Center, Outpatient Department and Flavier buildings.
