= 2025 Baguio local elections =

18th Mayoral elections in Baguio

2025 Baguio mayoral election
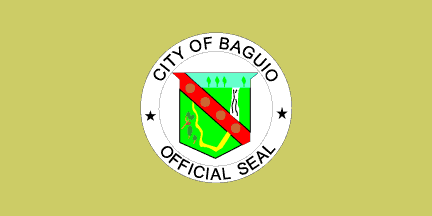
- May 12, 2025
- Mayoral election
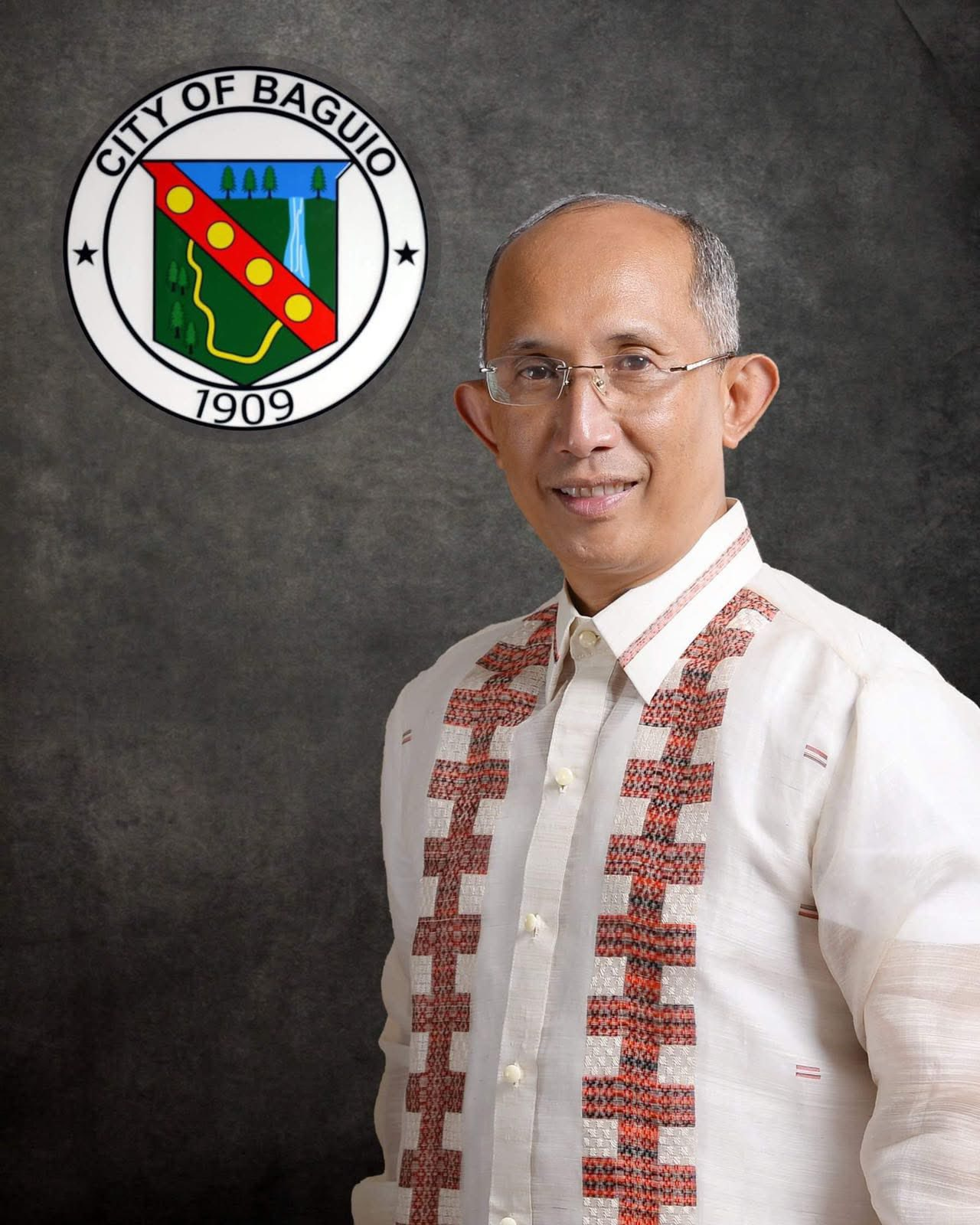

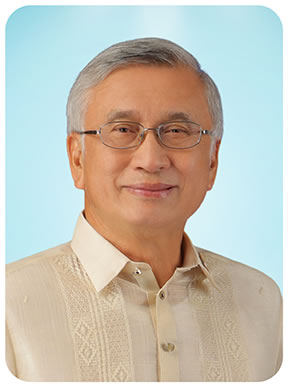
Candidate	Benjamin Magalong	Mark Go	Benny Bomogao
Party	NPC	Nacionalista	Independent
Running mate	Faustino Olowan	Mylen Yaranon	N/A
Popular vote	55,497	43,732	27,561
Percentage	42.80%	33.73%	21.26%
Mayor before election
Benjamin Magalong
NPC
Elected mayor
Benjamin Magalong
NPC
- Vice mayoral election
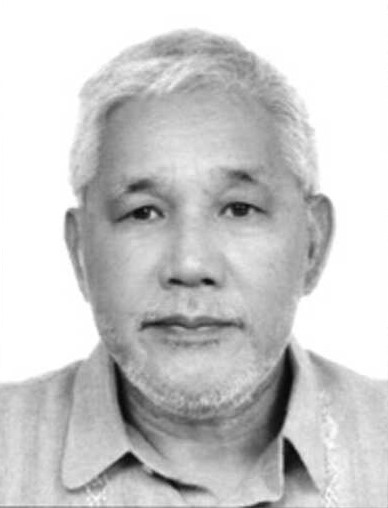

Candidate	Faustino Olowan	Mylen Yaranon
Party	PFP	Nacionalista
Popular vote	86,302	35,338
Percentage	70.95%	29.05%
Vice Mayor before election
Faustino Olowan
PFP
Elected Vice Mayor
Faustino Olowan
PFP

Local elections were held in Baguio on Monday, May 12, 2025, as a part of the 2025 Philippine general election. Voters will elect candidates for the local elective posts in the city: the mayor, vice mayor, the congressman, and the twelve councilors.

Incumbent Mayor Benjamin Magalong won his re-election bid for the mayoralty race, securing his third and final term, beating incumbent representative Mark Go. In the vice mayoral race, incumbent Vice Mayor Faustino Olowan also won his re-election bid, defeating Mylen Yaranon. Former mayor Mauricio Domogan won his bid for a first term as representative, returning to the said position after 15 years.

== Background ==
Re-electionist Benjamin Magalong won the mayoralty race in 2022, and is seeking for a re-election for third and final term in office.

== Candidates ==
=== Good Governance Alliance ===
Good Governance Alliance (NPC/PFP/LP/PRP)
#	Name	Party
For Mayor
6.	Benjamin Magalong	NPC
For Vice Mayor
1.	Faustino Olowan	PFP
For House of Representatives
3.	Isabelo Cosalan Jr.	PFP
For Councilors
3.	Fred Bagbagen	PFP
5.	Spencer Basbas	Independent
8.	Pam Cariño	PFP
12.	Van Dicang	Independent
13.	Peter Fianza	Independent
23.	John Rhey Mananeng	PFP
26.	Jose Molintas	Liberal
28.	Jun Orca	PFP
29.	Levy Orcales	PRP
30.	Ron Perez	PFP
32.	Paolo Salvosa	Independent
38.	Yuri Weygan	NPC

=== Team Maka-Baguio Tayo ===
Team Maka-Baguio Tayo (NP/Lakas)
#	Name	Party
For Mayor
5.	Mark Go	Nacionalista
For Vice Mayor
2.	Mylen Yaranon	Nacionalista
For House of Representatives
6.	Soledad Go	Lakas
For Councilors
1.	Joel Alangsab	Lakas
2.	Standford Ang	Nacionalista
4.	JD Balajadia-Tabora	Nacionalista
7.	Edison Bilog	Lakas
9.	Eddie Carta	Lakas
11.	Elmer Datuin	Lakas
16.	Mike Humiding	Nacionalista
20.	Michael Lawana	Nacionalista
22.	Esther Litlit	Nacionalista
34.	Elaine Sembrano	Lakas
36.	Betty Lourdes Tabanda	Lakas
39.	Leandro Yangot Jr.	Nacionalista

=== Nationalist People's Coalition ===
Nationalist People's Coalition
#	Name	Party
For House of Representatives
7.	Gladys Vergara	NPC
For Councilor
14.	John Glenn Gaerlan	NPC

=== Timpuyog Ti Baguio ===
Timpuyog Ti Baguio
#	Name	Party
For Mayor
1.	Benny Bomogao	Independent
For House of Representatives
5.	Mauricio Domogan	Independent
For Councilors
10.	Vladimir Cayabas	Independent
18.	Ryan Javier	Independent
25.	Murphy Maspil Sr.	Independent
33.	Kurt Justin Santiago	Independent
35.	Esteban Somngi	Independent
37.	Ted Tan	Independent

=== Independents ===
Independents
#	Name	Party
For Mayor
2.	Abdul Camo	Independent
3.	Rei Ann Cayetano	Independent
4.	Mark Andrew Directo	Independent
For House of Representatives
1.	Nicasio Aliping Jr.	Independent
2.	Francis Rae Camtugan II	Independent
4.	Win-Win Demoni	Independent
For Councilors
6.	Norma Benuyo	Independent
15.	Edilberto Gapuz	Independent
17.	Tia Imadhay	Independent
19.	Eric James Kelly	Independent
21.	Saturnino Lem-ew	Independent
24.	Martin Manodon	Independent
27.	Salvador Francisco Neri IV	Independent
31.	Alberto Ramos Jr.	Independent

== Mayoral election ==
Incumbent mayor Benjamin Magalong was re-elected in 2022 and is running for a third term.

=== Candidates ===
==== Declared ====
- Benny Bomogao (Independent), member of the Sangguniang Panlungsod ng Baguio (2016–2025)
- Abdul Camo (Independent)
- Rei Ann Cayetano (Independent)
- Mark Andrew Directo (Independent)
- Mark Go (Nacionalista Party), member of the Philippine House of Representatives of Baguio's lone district (2016–2025)
- Benjamin Magalong (Nationalist People's Coalition), incumbent mayor of Baguio (2019–present)

=== Results ===
Candidate	Party	Votes	%
Benjamin Magalong (incumbent)	Nationalist People's Coalition	55,497	42.80
Mark Go	Nacionalista Party	43,732	33.73
Benny Bomogao	Independent	27,561	21.26
Mark Andrew Directo	Independent	2,446	1.89
Rei Ann Cayetano	Independent	346	0.27
Abdul Camo	Independent	70	0.05
Total		129,652	100.00
Source: Commission on Elections

== Vice mayoral election ==
Incumbent vice mayor Faustino Olowan is running for re-election.

=== Candidates ===
==== Declared ====
- Faustino Olowan (Partido Federal ng Pilipinas), incumbent vice mayor of Baguio (2019–present)
- Mylen Yaranon (Nacionalista Party), member of the Sangguniang Panlungsod ng Baguio (2016–2025)

=== Results ===
Candidate	Party	Votes	%
Faustino Olowan (incumbent)	Partido Federal ng Pilipinas	86,302	70.95
Mylen Yaranon	Nacionalista Party	35,338	29.05
Total		121,640	100.00
Source: Commission on Elections

== Congressional election ==
Candidate	Party	Votes	%
Mauricio Domogan	Independent	44,716	35.62
Isabelo Cosalan Jr.	Partido Federal ng Pilipinas	32,011	25.50
Sol Go	Lakas–CMD	19,687	15.68
Nicasio Aliping Jr.	Independent	17,233	13.73
Gladys Vergara	Nationalist People's Coalition	10,420	8.30
Francis Rae Camtugan II	Independent	1,244	0.99
Win-Win Demoni	Independent	224	0.18
Total		125,535	100.00
Source: Commission on Elections

== City Council election ==
Party	Votes	%	Seats
Lakas–CMD	280,725	24.05	4
Nacionalista Party	211,059	18.08	1
Partido Federal ng Pilipinas	157,523	13.49	1
Nationalist People's Coalition	72,218	6.19	1
Liberal Party	56,196	4.81	1
People's Reform Party	30,603	2.62	0
Independent	359,048	30.76	4
Ex officio seats			2
Reserved seats			1
Total	1,167,372	100.00	15

Candidate	Party	Votes	%
Edison Bilog	Lakas–CMD	58,218	4.99
Joel Alangsab	Lakas–CMD	57,174	4.90
Jose Molintas (incumbent)	Liberal Party	56,196	4.81
Leandro Yangot Jr. (incumbent)	Nacionalista Party	55,972	4.79
Vladimir Cayabas (incumbent)	Independent	53,461	4.58
Peter Fianza (incumbent)	Independent	51,602	4.42
Van Dicang	Independent	49,434	4.23
Fred Bagbagen (incumbent)	Partido Federal ng Pilipinas	48,642	4.17
Paolo Salvosa	Independent	48,544	4.16
Betty Lourdes Tabanda (incumbent)	Lakas–CMD	47,807	4.10
Yuri Weygan	Nationalist People's Coalition	47,054	4.03
Elmer Datuin (incumbent)	Lakas–CMD	46,036	3.94
Michael Lawana	Nacionalista Party	41,042	3.52
Esther Litlit	Nacionalista Party	37,136	3.18
Elaine Sembrano	Lakas–CMD	36,657	3.14
JD Balajadia-Tabora	Nacionalista Party	36,424	3.12
Eddie Carta	Lakas–CMD	34,833	2.98
Jun Orca	Partido Federal ng Pilipinas	32,282	2.77
Ron Perez	Partido Federal ng Pilipinas	31,577	2.70
Levy Orcales	People's Reform Party	30,603	2.62
Pam Cariño	Partido Federal ng Pilipinas	28,256	2.42
John Glenn Gaerlan	Nationalist People's Coalition	25,164	2.16
Esteban Somngi	Independent	23,770	2.04
Mike Humiding	Nacionalista Party	20,893	1.79
Standford Ang	Nacionalista Party	19,592	1.68
Murphy Maspil Sr.	Independent	18,250	1.56
Kurt Justin Santiago	Independent	17,532	1.50
Spencer Basbas	Independent	16,882	1.45
John Rhey Mananeng	Partido Federal ng Pilipinas	16,766	1.44
Eric James Kelly	Independent	14,301	1.23
Ryan Javier	Independent	11,948	1.02
Ted Tan	Independent	11,683	1.00
Saturnino Lem-ew	Independent	11,131	0.95
Salvador Francisco Neri IV	Independent	8,114	0.70
Martin Manodon	Independent	6,084	0.52
Alberto Ramos Jr.	Independent	5,207	0.45
Edilberto Gapuz	Independent	4,100	0.35
Tia Imadhay	Independent	3,745	0.32
Norma Benuyo	Independent	3,260	0.28
Total		1,167,372	100.00
Source: Commission on Elections
