= Governor of Mountain Province =

Local chief executive

- Gobernador ng Lalawigang Bulubundukin
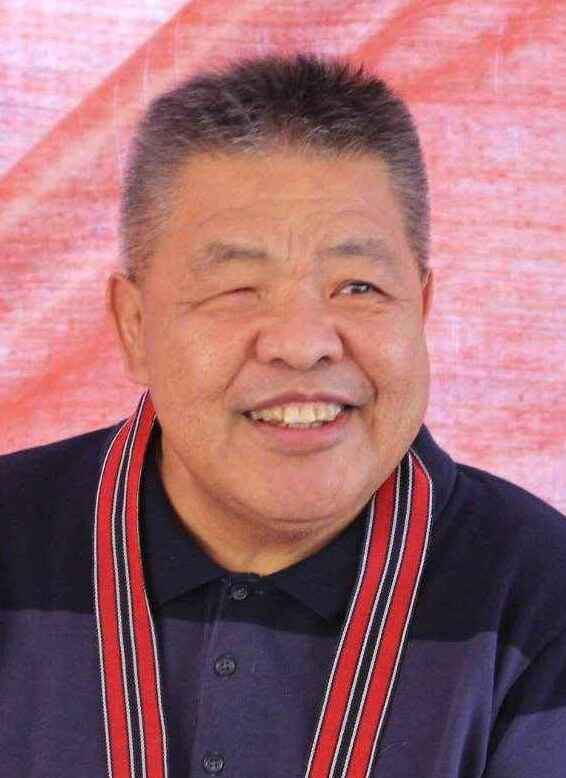
- Incumbent; Bonifacio Lacwasan since March 31, 2016
- Style: The Honorable
- Seat: Mountain Province Provincial Capitol, Bontoc
- Term length: 3 years, renewable maximum not eligible for re-election immediately after three consecutive terms
- Inaugural holder: Samuel Cane(de facto, as governor of undivided Mountain Province); Alfredo Galaygay Lamen Sr. (de jure, first elected governor)
- Formation: April 7, 1967
- Deputy: Vice Governor

The governor of Mountain Province is the local chief executive and head of the Provincial Government of Mountain Province in the Philippines.

== List ==
1. THIRD PHILIPPINE REPUBLIC (1960–1980)
No.	Name	Term	Origin	Note(s)
1	Alfredo Galaygay Lamen Sr.	April 7, 1967 - January 1, 1968	Sagada	First governor, appointed by President Ferdinand E. Marcos.
1	Alfredo Galaygay Lamen Sr.	January 1, 1968 - December 30, 1969	Sagada	First elected governor.
2	Jaime K. Gomez Sr.	December 30, 1969 to June 30, 1971	Bontoc	First appointed and elected vice-governor. Succeeded Lamen Sr. as governor when the incumbent run and won congressman of lone district.
2	Jaime K. Gomez Sr.	December 30, 1971 to June 30, 1979	Bontoc	Elected.
3	Saturnino Moldero Jr.	1979 - 1980??	—	OIC Governor

2. FOURTH PHILIPPINE REPUBLIC (1980–1986)
No.	Name	Term	Origin	Note(s)
4	Nicasio T. Aliping Sr.	1980 - 1983??	—	OIC Governor
5	Modesto Calde	1984?? - March 15, 1986	—	OIC Governor

3. FIFTH PHILIPPINE REPUBLIC (1986–present)
No.	Image	Name	Term	Origin	Note(s)
6		John Likigan Sr.	March 16, 1986 - June 30, 1988??	—	OIC Governor
7		Roy S. Pilando	June 30, 1988 - 1989	—	Elected
8		Alfredo Lamen Jr.	1989-1990	Sagada	OIC Governor. Elected vice-governor.
—		Roy S. Pilando	1991 - June 30, 1992	—	Completed interrupted term.
9		Maximo B. Dalog Sr.	June 30, 1992 - June 30, 1998	Bauko	Elected twice.
10		Leonard Mayaen	June 30, 1998- June 30, 2001	Besao	Elected.
11		Sario M. Malinias	June 30, 2001 – June 30, 2004	Bauko	Elected.
—		Maximo B. Dalog Sr.	June 30, 2004 - June 30, 2010	Bauko	Reelected on his 3rd and 4th term. Longest serving governor.
12		Leonard Mayaen	June 30, 2010 - June 30, 2013	Besao	Reelected on his 2nd term.
12		Leonard Mayaen	June 30, 2013 - March 31, 2016	Besao	Reelected on his 3rd term. Died while on office.
13		Bonifacio Lacwasan	March 31, 2016 - June 30, 2016	Bauko	Former vice-governor. Succeeded Gov. Mayaen.
13		Bonifacio Lacwasan	June 30, 2016 - present	Bauko	Elected in 3 consecutive terms.
