= Mark Go =

Filipino businessman and politician

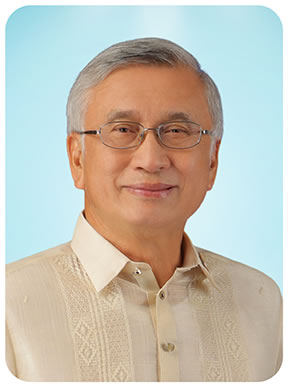
- Official portrait, 2022

Chairman of the House Committee on Higher and Technical Education
- In office June 30, 2016 – June 30, 2025
- Succeeded by: Jude Acidre

Member of the Philippine House of Representatives from Baguio's Lone District
- In office June 30, 2016 – June 30, 2025
- Preceded by: Nicasio Aliping Jr.
- Succeeded by: Mauricio Domogan

Personal details
- Born: September 28, 1952 (age 74) Manila, Philippines
- Party: Nacionalista (2015–present)
- Other political affiliations: Liberal (2012–2015); PMP (2009–2012)
- Spouse: Soledad Go
- Children: 8
- Education: University of the Philippines Diliman (A.B., MS)
- Occupation: Politician
- Profession: Businessman
- Website: https://www.markgo.org

Marquez "Mark" Ocampo Go (born September 28, 1952) is a Filipino businessman and politician. A member of the Nacionalista Party, he served representative of the legislative district of Baguio from 2016 to 2025. He is also an outstanding citizen of Baguio awardee in 1998.

== Early life and education ==
Go was born on September 28, 1952, in Manila. During his elementary and high school education, he was a consistent honor student. He finished his AB Political Science at the University of the Philippines Diliman in 1975. He would go on to obtain his Master of Management from the same university in 1979.

== Professional career ==
Go has a sleuth of career experiences including a multitude of management positions under his belt.:

| Employment | Position |
|---|---|
| University of the Philippines – Baguio | Assistant Professor |
| Texas Instruments Philippines – Baguio | Training and Development Manager |
| Texas Instruments Philippines – Baguio | Human Resources Director |
| Texas Instruments Philippines – Baguio | Human Resources, Procurement and Logistics Director |
| Cypress Mfg Ltd. | Site Services Director |
| Baguio Water District | Director and chairman |
| John Hay Poro Point Development Corporation | Director |
| Regional Tripartite Wages and Productivity Board | Employer's representative |

== Political career ==
=== 2010 Mayoralty Bid ===
Go entered the political arena in 2010 when he mounted his bid as Mayor of the City of Baguio under the Pwersa ng Masang Pilipino. He went against political heavyweights, such as then Representative Mauricio Domogan and then Councilor Jose Molintas. Go would lose in his 2010 bid to Domogan.

=== 2013 Congressional Bid ===
In 2013, Go would go on to try and win the seat for Baguio's lone legislative district under the Liberal Party. He went against incumbent Congressman Bernardo Vergara and Councilor Nicasio Aliping Jr. He finished as second in this election, garnering 31,529 against Congressman-elect Aliping's 33,402.

=== 2016 Congressional Bid ===
==== Election ====
Go tried once more to win the congressional seat of Baguio, this time under the Nacionalista Party. With 45,482 votes, he secured the congressional seat beating incumbent Cong. Aliping's 40,459 votes and former Cong. Vergara's 20,553.

==== 17th Congress ====
During his first term as congressman, Go would go on to author 65 bills and co-author several others, now signed into law. Some of them include:

- RA 10931 – Universal Access to Quality Tertiary Education
- RA 11036 – National Mental Health Act
- RA 11084 – Increasing the bed capacity of Baguio General Hospital and Medical Center (BGHMC)
- RA 11223 – Universal Health Care Act of 2019
- HBN 6974 – Baguio, La Trinidad, Itogon, Sablan, Tuba, and Tublay Development Authority (BLISTTDA)
- HBN 9156 – Free Dialysis and Renal Treatment to Indigent Patients

=== 2019 Re-election Bid ===
==== Election ====
In 2018, Go filed his certificate of candidacy for his re-election as the city's congressman, with contenders including Mayor Mauricio Domogan and former Congressman Aliping. News circulated before the May elections claiming that his HBN 6974 would result in the displacement of residents of Barangays Quirino Hill and Pinget, which Go denied. Multiple other accusations of harassment by Go's camp on Anti-BLISTTDA proponents were also denied. These claims would later be proved false after the election. On May 14, 2019, he won in his re-election campaign, garnering a total vote of 58,603 over Domogan's 30,443 votes, his nearest opponent. This would be Domogan's first ever political defeat. He was proclaimed along with Mayor-elect Benjamin Magalong and Vice Mayor-elect Faustino A. Olowan.

=== 18th Congress ===
In the 18th Congress, Go refiled nine bills- six with national significance and implementation, and three for implementation in Baguio and Benguet:

- HBN 1377 - Baguio, La Trinidad, Itogon, Sablan, Tuba, and Tublay Development Authority or BLISTTDA
- HBN 1338 - Increase the number of service incentive leave credits from the current five days to 10 days
- HBN 1339 - Establish a dialysis unit in a government hospital in every province and/or region
- HBN 1340 - Response to climate change
- HBN 1341 - Burnham Park, Baguio as a national heritage
- HBN 1342 - Full rehabilitation and maintenance of the Kennon Road
- HBN 1343 - Provide health, retirement and other benefits to golf caddies and other independent workers who render their services to golf clubs
- HBN 1344 - Establish the Barangay Road Development (BRD) Program
- HBN 1391 - Advance centenarian cash gift grants of PHP25,000 upon reaching the age of 85, PHP25,000 upon reaching the age of 90, PHP50,000 upon reaching the age of 95 and PHP100,000 upon reaching the age of 100

Other bills filed by Go during the 18th Congress:

- HBN 2576 - Standard compensation for barangay officials, workers, and Sangguniang Kabataan officials
- HBN 4222 - Proper installation and maintenance of public utility cables and wires
- HBN 4263 - Establish the Philippine Entrepreneurs Academy
- HBN 4813 - Graduating students for Reforestation Act of 2019

=== 2022 Re-election Bid ===
==== Election ====
On October 10, 2021, he filed his COC for re-election, gunning for a third consecutive term since being elected in 2016. He will face off with former Rep. Nicasio Aliping, Alexis Albano, Edgardo Duque, Reynaldo Diaz Jr. and Rafael Wasan.

=== 2025 Mayoralty Bid ===
Rep. Mark Go filed his Certificate of Candidacy for mayor of Baguio on Monday, October 7. Mr. Go led members of his Team “Maka-Baguio Tayo” in filing their respective CoCs before the Commission on Elections at the Baguio Convention and Cultural Center. He was joined by his running mate for vice mayor, Maria Mylen Victoria G. Yaranon. Go eventually lost to incumbent mayor Benjamin Magalong.

== Electoral history ==
Electoral history of Mark Go
| Year | Office | Party | Votes received | | | | Result |
| Year | Office | Party | Total | % | P. | Swing | Result |
|---|---|---|---|---|---|---|---|
| 2010 | Mayor of Baguio | PMP | 21,072 | —N/a | 3rd | —N/a | Lost |
| 2025 | Mayor of Baguio | Nacionalista | 43,732 | 33.73% | 2nd | —N/a | Lost |
| 2013 | Representative (Baguio at-large) | Liberal | 31,529 | 36.25% | 2nd | —N/a | Lost |
| 2016 | Representative (Baguio at-large) | Nacionalista | 45,687 | —N/a | 1st | —N/a | Won |
| 2019 | Representative (Baguio at-large) | Nacionalista | 58,603 | 52.65% | 1st | —N/a | Won |
| 2022 | Representative (Baguio at-large) | Nacionalista | 99,372 | 75.11% | 1st | —N/a | Won |

== Awards and citations ==
- 1994 Outstanding Rotary Club President
- 1998 Fellow in Personnel Management
- 1998 Outstanding Citizen of Baguio
- 2002 Outstanding Rotary Governor (Worldwide)
- 2012 Service above self awardee Rotary international
- 2015 Distinguished Alumni Service Awardee, UP Alumni Association

The Lyceum Northwestern University conferred Doctor of Humanities, honoris causa on Go in 2002.
