= Mountain Province Provincial Board =

Legislative body of the province of Mountain Province, Philippines

Mountain Province Provincial Board Sangguniang Panlalawigan ng Lalawigang Bulubundukin

Type
- Type: Unicameral
- Term limits: 3 terms (9 years)

Leadership
- Presiding Officer: Jose O. Dominguez, Independent since June 30, 2025

Structure
- Seats: 12 board members 1 ex officio presiding officer
- Political groups: PFP (4) Nacionalista (3) LDP (1) Independent (2) Nonpartisan (4)
- Length of term: 3 years
- Authority: Local Government Code of the Philippines

Elections
- Voting system: Multiple non-transferable vote (regular members); Indirect election (ex officio members); Acclamation (sectoral member)
- Last election: May 12, 2025
- Next election: May 15, 2028

Meeting place
- Mountain Province Capitol, Bontoc

The Mountain Province Provincial Board is the Sangguniang Panlalawigan (provincial legislature) of the Philippine province of Mountain Province.

The members are elected via plurality-at-large voting: the province is divided into two districts, each having four seats. A voter votes up to four names, with the top four candidates per district being elected. The vice governor is the ex officio presiding officer, and only votes to break ties. The vice governor is elected via the plurality voting system province-wide.

Aside from the regular members, the board also includes the provincial federation presidents of the Liga ng mga Barangay (ABC, from its old name "Association of Barangay Captains"), the Sangguniang Kabataan (SK, youth councils) and the Philippine Councilors League (PCL). Mountain Province's provincial board also has a reserved seat for its indigenous people (IPMR).

== Apportionment ==
The districts used in appropriation of members is not coextensive with the legislative district of Mountain Province; unlike congressional representation which is at-large, Mountain Province is divided into two districts for representation in the Sangguniang Panlalawigan.

The first district includes the eastern side of the province, encompassing the capital, Bontoc, as well as the municipalities of Barlig, Natonin, Paracelis, and Sadanga. The second district comprises the western municipalities of Bauko, Besao, Sabangan, Sagada, and Tadian.

In 2025, the first and second districts gained one additional seat each after the Department of Finance upgraded the province's income classification to 2nd class, from 4th class.

Elections	Seats per district		Ex officio seats	Reserved seats	Total seats
Elections	1st	2nd	Ex officio seats	Reserved seats	Total seats
2010–2025	4	4	3	1	12
2025–present	5	5	3	1	14

== List of members ==
=== Current members ===
These are the members after the 2025 local elections and 2023 barangay and SK elections:

- Vice Governor: Jose O. Dominguez (Independent)

Seat	Board member	Party	Start of term	End of term
1st district	Roy M. Gammonac	Nacionalista	June 30, 2025	June 30, 2028
1st district	Federico E. Onsat	PFP	June 30, 2019	June 30, 2028
1st district	Ezra Samson A. Gomez	LDP	June 30, 2022	June 30, 2028
1st district	Joshua B. Fronda	PFP	June 30, 2019	June 30, 2028
1st district	Janice L. Barillo	Nacionalista	June 30, 2019	June 30, 2028
2nd district	Joseph Alejandro C. Dominguez	Independent	June 30, 2025	June 30, 2028
2nd district	Sally B. Ullalim	Independent	June 30, 2025	June 30, 2028
2nd district	Ricardo M. Masidong Jr.	PFP	June 30, 2022	June 30, 2028
2nd district	Johnson D. Bantog II	PFP	June 30, 2022	June 30, 2028
2nd district	Henry D. Bastian Jr.	Nacionalista	June 30, 2019	June 30, 2028
ABC	Alfonso Ligos Jr.	Nonpartisan	July 30, 2018	January 1, 2023
PCL	Juniper K. Kidit Sr.	Nonpartisan	September 8, 2025	June 30, 2028
SK	Jazzel-Mae Masidong	Nonpartisan	June 8, 2018	January 1, 2023
IPMR	Tomas Tawagen	Nonpartisan	January 22, 2020	January 22, 2023

=== Vice governor ===
Election year	Name	Party	Ref.
2016	Bonifacio Lacwasan	Independent	
2019	Francis O. Tauli	PDP–Laban	
2022	Francis O. Tauli	PDP–Laban	
2025	Jose O. Dominguez	Independent	

=== 1st district ===
- Population (2024):

Election year	Member (party)	Member (party)	Member (party)	Member (party)	Member (party)	Ref.
2016	Alfonso Kiat-Ong (until 2018) (Liberal)	Cariño Tamang (Liberal)	Raul Lapon (Independent)	Stephen Afuyog (Independent)	—N/a	
2016	Christopher Kiat-Ong (since 2018) (Independent)	Cariño Tamang (Liberal)	Raul Lapon (Independent)	Stephen Afuyog (Independent)	—N/a	
2019	Janice L. Barillo (Independent)	Federico E. Onsat (Independent)	Alexandre Claver (until 2021) (Independent)	Joshua B. Fronda (PFP)	—N/a	
2022	Ezra Samson A. Gomez (LDP)	Federico E. Onsat (PDP–Laban)	Cariño Tamang (Nacionalista)	Joshua B. Fronda (PDP–Laban)	—N/a	
2025	Ezra Samson A. Gomez (LDP)	Federico E. Onsat (PFP)	Roy M. Gammonac (Nacionalista)	Joshua B. Fronda (PFP)	Janice L. Barillo (Nacionalista)	

=== 2nd district ===
- Population (2024):

Election year	Member (party)	Member (party)	Member (party)	Member (party)	Member (party)	Ref.
2016	Francis O. Tauli (Independent)	Donato L. Danglose (Independent)	Salvador K. Dalang (Independent)	Romeo Pagedped (Liberal)	—N/a	
2019	Henry D. Bastian, Jr. (PDP–Laban)	Donato L. Danglose (PDP–Laban)	Salvador K. Dalang (PDP–Laban)	Randolph T. Awisan (PDP–Laban)	—N/a	
2022	Henry D. Bastian, Jr. (PDP–Laban)	Donato L. Danglose (PDP–Laban)	Ricardo M. Masidong, Jr. (Nacionalista)	Johnson D. Bantog, II (Independent)	—N/a	
2025	Henry D. Bastian, Jr. (Nacionalista)	Joseph Alejandro C. Dominguez (Independent)	Ricardo M. Masidong, Jr. (PFP)	Johnson D. Bantog, II (PFP)	Sally B. Ullalim (Independent)	
