= Governor of Apayao =

Local chief executive

Provincial Governor of Apayao
- Incumbent; Elias Bulut Jr. since June 30, 2022
- Appointer: Elected via popular vote
- Term length: 3 years
- Inaugural holder: Batara Laoat
- Formation: 1995

The governor of Apayao (Filipino: Punong Panlalawigan ng Apayao), is the chief executive of the provincial government of Apayao.

== Provincial Governors (1995–present) ==
No.	Image	Name	Year in office
1		Batara Laoat	1995–2001
2		Elias K. Bulut Sr.	2001–2010
3		Elias C. Bulut Jr.	2010–2019
4		Eleonor C. Bulut-Begtang	2019–2022
(3)		Elias C. Bulut Jr.	2022–present
