= Eleanor Begtang =

Filipino politician

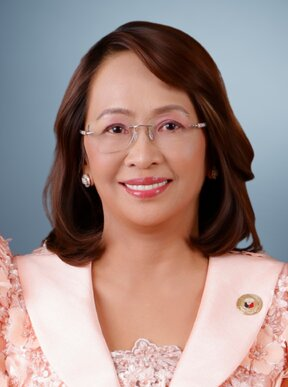
- Official portrait, 2025

Member of the Philippine House of Representatives from Apayao's Lone District
- Incumbent
- Assumed office June 30, 2022
- Preceded by: Elias Bulut Jr.
- In office June 30, 2010 – June 30, 2019
- Preceded by: Elias Bulut Jr.
- Succeeded by: Elias Bulut Jr.

4th Governor of Apayao
- In office June 30, 2019 – June 30, 2022
- Vice Governor: Remy Albano
- Preceded by: Elias Bulut Jr.
- Succeeded by: Elias Bulut Jr.

Mayor of Calanasan
- In office June 30, 2001 – June 30, 2010
- Preceded by: Elias Bulut Jr.
- Succeeded by: Elias K. Bulut Sr.

Personal details
- Born: Eleonor Cayaba Bulut; February 28, 1964 (age 62) Ballesteros, Cagayan, Philippines
- Party: NPC (2001–2007; 2012–2018; 2021–present)
- Other political affiliations: PDP–Laban (2018–2021); Lakas (2008–2012); KAMPI (2007–2008)
- Relations: Elias Bulut Jr. (brother)
- Education: University of the Philippines Baguio (BS)

Eleanor Bulut Begtang (born February 28, 1964) is a Filipina politician from the province of Apayao, Philippines. She is a former mayor of Calanasan from 2001 to 2010. And also the former governor of Apayao in northern Philippines from 2019 to 2022. She was elected as a governor in 2019 after she completed her three allowable term as a congresswoman of Apayao from 2010 to 2019. She is currently the representative of Apayao, having been elected in 2022.

House of Representatives of the Philippines
Preceded by Elias Bulut Jr.	Member of the House of Representatives from Apayao's at-large district 2022–present 2010–2019	Incumbent
Preceded by Elias Bulut Jr.	Member of the House of Representatives from Apayao's at-large district 2022–present 2010–2019	Succeeded by Elias Bulut Jr.
Political offices
Preceded by Elias Bulut Jr.	Governor of Apayao; 2019–2022	Succeeded by Elias Bulut Jr.
