= Elias Bulut Jr. =

Filipino politician

Elias Bulut
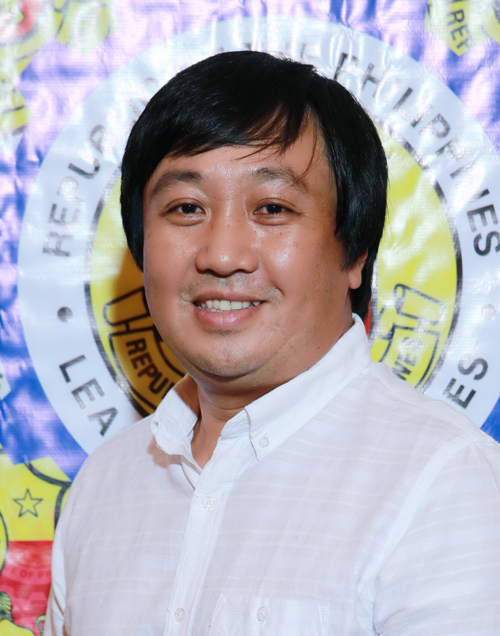

3rd Governor of Apayao
- Incumbent
- Assumed office June 30, 2022
- Vice Governor: Remy Albano (2022–2025); Kyle Bulut (2025–present)
- Preceded by: Eleonor Bulut Begtang
- In office June 30, 2010 – June 30, 2019
- Vice Governor: Hector Pascua (2010–2016); Remy Albano (2016–2019)
- Preceded by: Elias Bulut, Sr.
- Succeeded by: Eleonor Bulut Begtang

Member of the Philippine House of Representatives from Lone District of Apayao
- In office June 30, 2019 – June 30, 2022
- Preceded by: Eleonor Bulut Begtang
- Succeeded by: Eleanor Bulut Begtang
- In office June 30, 2001 – June 30, 2010
- Preceded by: Elias Bulut, Sr.
- Succeeded by: Eleonor Bulut Begtang

Mayor of Calanasan
- In office June 30, 1998 – June 30, 2001
- Preceded by: Perfecto D. Marrero
- Succeeded by: Eleanor Bulut Begtang

Personal details
- Born: Elias Cayaba Bulut; May 15, 1970 (age 56) Baguio, Benguet, Philippines
- Party: NPC (until 2009; 2018–present)
- Other political affiliations: Liberal (2012–2018); Lakas (2009–2012)
- Occupation: Politician

Elias Cayaba Bulut Jr. (born May 15, 1970) is a Filipino politician and the current governor of Apayao province. A member of the Nationalist People's Coalition, he has been elected to three terms as a Member of the House of Representatives of the Philippines, representing the Lone District of Apayao. First elected in 2001, he was re-elected in 2004 and 2007. He was a former mayor of Calanasan from 1998 to 2001. And also a former vice-mayor of Calanasan from 1995 to 1998.

Political offices
Preceded by Eleonor Bulut Begtang	Governor of Apayao; 2022–present	Incumbent
Preceded by Elias K. Bulut	Governor of Apayao; 2010–2019	Succeeded by Eleonor Bulut Begtang
House of Representatives of the Philippines
Preceded by Eleonor Bulut Begtang	Member of the House of Representatives from Apayao's at-large district 2019–2022	Succeeded by Eleonor Bulut Begtang
Preceded by Elias K. Bulut	Member of the House of Representatives from Apayao's at-large district 2001–2010	Succeeded by Eleonor Bulut Begtang
