= Leonard Mayaen =

Governor of Mountain Province
- In office June 30, 2010 – March 31, 2016
- Preceded by: Maximo Dalog Sr.
- Succeeded by: Bonifacio Lacwasan
- In office June 30, 1998 – June 30, 2001
- Preceded by: Maximo Dalog Sr.
- Succeeded by: Sario Malinias

Personal details
- Born: Leonard Gabas Mayaen; March 14, 1953 Besao, Mountain Province, Philippines
- Died: March 31, 2016 (aged 63) Bontoc, Mountain Province, Philippines
- Occupation: Politician

Leonard Gabas Mayaen (March 14, 1953 – March 31, 2016) was a Filipino politician and lawyer. He served as the governor of Mountain Province from 1998 until 2001 and again from 2010 until his death in 2016. Governor Mayaen died in office from cardiac arrest on March 31, 2016, during his second term. At the time of his death, Governor Mayaen was running unopposed for re-election to a third term in the forthcoming Mountain Province gubernatorial election on May 9, 2016.

== Early life and education ==
Mayaen was born in Besao, Mountain Province, on March 14, 1953, to a poor family. His family soon moved to Mount Data in nearby Bauko, where his parents found employment on vegetable farms. He attended Mount Data Elementary School, where he was named his class' valedictorian. Mayaen then completed law school.

== Career ==
In 1980, Mayaen left his position as a teacher at Tublay School of Home Economics to establish his own law office. He entered politics in 1988 when he was elected as a Mountain Province board member.

Mayaen was elected the Vice Governor of Mountain Province in 1992. He won re-election as Vice Governor in 1995. In 1998, Mayaen was elected Governor of Mountain Province, a position he held from 1998 to 2001 for one-term. He lost his gubernatorial re-election bid in 2001.

Mayaen launched a political comeback nearly a decade later when he was once again elected governor in 2010. In 2013, Mayaen won re-election in a landslide victory. Mayaen was running unopposed for a third, and final, term in the upcoming gubernatorial election on May 9, 2016, when he unexpectedly died in office.

== Death ==
Mayaen died in office of a heart attack on March 31, 2016, at the age of 63. He was found unresponsive on the floor of his bedroom in the Mountain Province Mansion House. Mayaen was taken to Bontoc General Hospital and later airlifted by the Philippine Air Force to Notre Dame De Chartres Hospital in Baguio, where he was pronounced dead by physicians. He was survived by his wife, Sonia Gawe Mayaen, and their six children. Governor Mayaen was buried at a family cemetery in Pinsao, Baguio, on April 8, 2016. He was succeeded in office by Vice Governor Boni Lacwasan until a successor could be elected.
