= Bonifacio Lacwasan =

Filipino politician

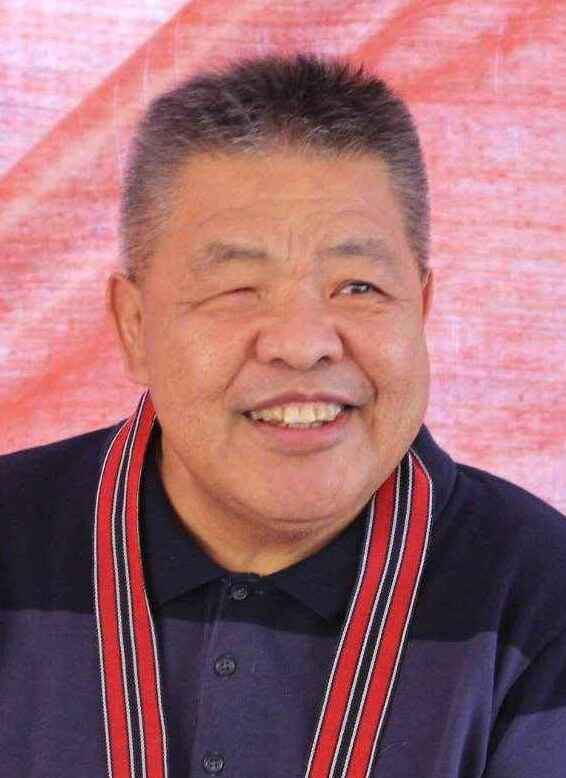

Governor of Mountain Province
- Incumbent
- Assumed office March 31, 2016
- Preceded by: Leonard Mayaen

Personal details
- Born: Bonifacio Calde Lacwasan Jr. September 15, 1958 (age 68) Bauko, Mountain Province, Philippines
- Party: PFP (2024–present)
- Other political affiliations: PDP (2016–2024); Independent (2012–2016); KAMPI (until 2008)
- Parent: Bonifacio Lacwasan Sr. (father)
- Education: University of Manila (BA)
- Occupation: Politician

Bonifacio Calde Lacwasan, Jr. (born September 15, 1958) is a Filipino politician who is the governor of Mountain Province.

== Background ==
Lacwasan's father was Bonifacio Lacwasan Sr., who served as deputy governor of the now defunct sub-province of Bontoc and a provincial board member of Mountain Province.

== Career ==
Lacwasan was elevated as Governor of Mountain Province following the death of Leonard Mayaen on March 31, 2016. As the vice governor at the time of Mayaen's death, Lacwasan was sworn in on April 5, 2016, after a period of mourning as per Igorot customs. He served Mayaen's unexpired term until June 30, 2016.

Lacwasan was supposed to seek a reelection bid as vice governor for the 2016 elections. The deceased Mayaen, who ran as an independent candidate, was the sole candidate for governor for that election. Lawyer and daughter of Mayaen, Kathy Jyll Mayaen-Luis claimed to be rightful governor as a substitute for her father's candidacy. However, her claim was disputed due to a rule that no substitution is allowed for an independent candidate. Lacwasan would be ordered by the Commission on Elections to serve as acting governor once again.

Lacwasan would run for Mountain Province governor and win in the 2019 elections. He secured a fresh mandate in the 2022 elections. He ran under PDP-Laban.

== Electoral history ==
Electoral history of Bonifacio Lacwasan
Year	Office	Party	Votes received				Result
Year	Office	Party	Total	%	P.	Swing	Result
2019	Governor of Mountain Province	PDP–Laban	31,908	39.99%	1st	—N/a	Won
2022	Governor of Mountain Province	PDP–Laban	76,104	89.30%	1st	+49.31	Won
2025	Governor of Mountain Province	PFP	50,666	52.04%	1st	-37.26	Won
