= Legislative districts of Benguet =

Legislative district of the Philippines

The legislative districts of Benguet are the representations of the province of Benguet in the various national legislatures of the Philippines. The province is currently represented in the lower house of the Congress of the Philippines through its lone congressional district.

== History ==
In 1917, the undivided Mountain Province, of which Benguet was a component sub-province, was provided representation in the Philippine Legislature. Pursuant to the Revised Administrative Code (Act No. 2711) enacted on March 10, 1917, the non-Christian-majority areas of the Philippines, which then included the Mountain Province and Baguio, were to be collectively represented in the legislature's upper house by two senators from the 12th senatorial district, both appointed by the Governor-General. Three assembly members, also appointed by the Governor-General, were to represent the Mountain Province and the chartered city of Baguio in the lower house as a single at-large district.

The residents of Benguet and the rest of the Mountain Province only began electing representatives through popular vote in 1935 by virtue of Act No. 4203; the law provided the territorial coverage for each lower house representative district, while also abolishing the senatorial district system. The sub-province was then represented as part of the Mountain Province's second district, which also included the city of Baguio.

In the disruption caused by the Second World War, the Mountain Province sent two delegates to the National Assembly of the Japanese-sponsored Second Philippine Republic: one was the provincial governor (an ex officio member), while the other was elected through a provincial assembly of KALIBAPI members during the Japanese occupation of the Philippines. Baguio, being a chartered city, was represented separately in this short-lived legislative body. Upon the restoration of the Philippine Commonwealth in 1945, district representation was restored to the pre-war setup: the sub-province of Benguet and Baguio remained part of Mountain Province's second district.

The enactment of Republic Act No. 4695 on June 18, 1966 made the sub-province of Benguet into a full-fledged province. Per Section 10 of R.A. 4695 Baguio was to be part of the newly independent province's representative district. Benguet, along with Baguio, began electing its separate representative starting in the next general election.

Benguet was represented in the Interim Batasang Pambansa as part of Region I from 1978 to 1984. The province returned one representative, elected at-large, to the Regular Batasang Pambansa in 1984. Baguio separately elected its own representative in this election.

Under the new Constitution which was proclaimed on February 11, 1987, Benguet was once more grouped with Baguio. The latter, though an independent city since 1909, comprised what was legally known between 1987 and 1995 as the first district of Benguet, while the actual province itself comprised the second district. Both elected members to the restored House of Representatives starting that same year.

Starting in 1995 the first district was re-designated as the "Legislative district of Baguio", thereby making the second district Benguet's lone district.

Since 2019, the districts used in appropriation of members is coextensive with the legislative districts of Benguet. Prior to 2019 when the province was just one congressional district, the Commission on Elections divided the province into two provincial board districts.

== Lone District ==
- Population (2015): 446,224

Period	Representative
9th Congress; 1992–1995	Samuel M. Dangwa
10th Congress; 1995–1998	Ronald M. Cosalan
11th Congress; 1998–2001	Ronald M. Cosalan
12th Congress; 2001–2004	Samuel M. Dangwa
13th Congress; 2004–2007	Samuel M. Dangwa
14th Congress; 2007–2010	Samuel M. Dangwa
15th Congress; 2010–2013	Ronald M. Cosalan
16th Congress; 2013–2016	Ronald M. Cosalan
17th Congress; 2016–2019	Ronald M. Cosalan
18th Congress; 2019–2022	Nestor Fongwan (Note: Died on December 18, 2019.)
18th Congress; 2019–2022	vacant (Note: ACT-CIS Partylist Representative Eric Go Yap was appointed caretaker representative on January 20, 2020.)
19th Congress; 2022–2025	Eric G. Yap
20th Congress; 2025–2028	Eric G. Yap

=== 1969–1972 ===
- includes Baguio (Note: Independent from the province and does not vote for provincial officials since 1909 by virtue of Philippine Commission Act No. 1964. Only voted with Benguet for congressional representation.)

Period	Representative
7th Congress; 1969–1972	Andres Cosalan

== 1st District (defunct) ==
- City: Baguio (Note: Highly-urbanized city; Independent from the province and does not vote for provincial officials since September 1, 1909 by virtue of Act No. 1964.)

Period	Representative
8th Congress; 1987–1992	Honorato Y. Aquino

== 2nd District (defunct) ==
- Municipalities: Atok, Bakun, Bokod, Buguias, Itogon, Kabayan, Kapangan, Kibungan, La Trinidad, Mankayan, Sablan, Tuba, Tublay

Period	Representative
8th Congress; 1987–1992	Samuel M. Dangwa

== At-Large (defunct) ==
- excludes Baguio

Period	Representative
Regular Batasang Pambansa; 1984–1986	Samuel M. Dangwa

== See also ==
- Legislative district of Baguio
- Legislative district of Mountain Province
