= Bado Dangwa =

Filipino entrepreneur

The Honorable Bado Dangwa
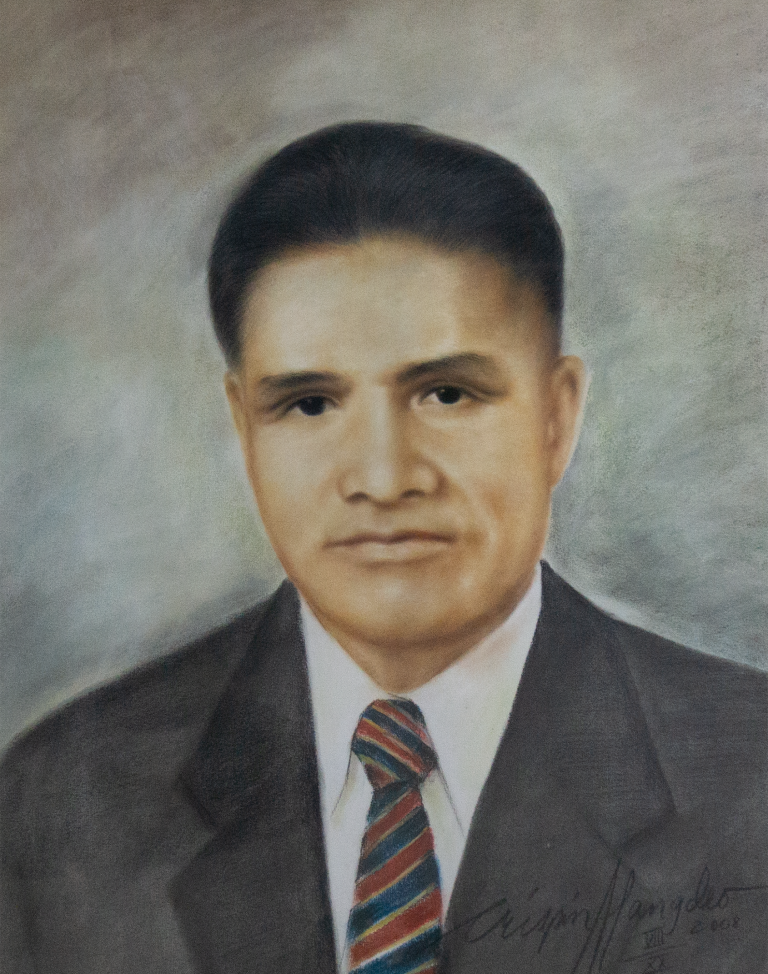

Governor of Benguet
- In office April 6, 1953 – December 30, 1963
- Preceded by: Dalmacio Lubos
- Succeeded by: Ben Palispis

Personal details
- Born: May 5, 1905 Kapangan, Benguet, Philippine Islands
- Died: March 18, 1976 (aged 70)

Military service
- Allegiance: Philippines; United States
- Branch/service: Philippine Army; USAFFE
- Years of service: 1941-1945
- Rank: Colonel
- Unit: 66th Infantry Regiment
- Battles/wars: World War II

Bado Maduway Dangwa (May 5, 1905 – March 18, 1976) was a Filipino entrepreneur, soldier and politician who founded the Dangwa Transportation Company, one of the biggest transport firms in the northern Philippines, and served as the twelfth Governor of Benguet.

== Birth ==
Dangwa was born on May 5, 1905, in Kapangan, Benguet.

== Transport business ==
While studying at the La Trinidad Agricultural School, his passion towards mechanics caught the attention of his American teacher James Wright, who convinced him to start a business in transportation and helped him buy five dilapidated vehicles from a garage owner in La Trinidad which became the nucleus of the firm he founded, the Dangwa Transportation Company, which was incorporated in 1935. After borrowing P10 from a friend, Dangwa managed to repair his vehicles to serviceability, converting them into prototypes of the jeepney which plied the La Trinidad-Baguio route. His business soon prospered, and by the eve of the Second World War, he had amassed a fleet of 173 buses carrying passengers and cargo and plying routes across the historic Mountain Province and into Manila.

== Military career ==
During the war, Dangwa was commissioned into the Philippine army as a first lieutenant but was later promoted to major handling the 66th Infantry Regiment. During the Japanese occupation, he joined the guerrilla movement and ended the war as a colonel. He then rebuilt and expanded his transport company, which sustained heavy losses during the conflict.

== Governor of Benguet ==
Dangwa became the last appointed Governor of Benguet after being chosen by President Elpidio Quirino in 1953, and was retained by his successor, Ramon Magsaysay in 1954. When the position became an elected post in 1955, Dangwa became the first elected governor of the province and served in that capacity until 1963.

== Personal life and death ==
Dangwa was married to Maria Antero, who became a prominent civic leader in Benguet. He died on March 18, 1976.

His nephew, Samuel Dangwa, was vice governor of Benguet from 1972 to 1980, an Assemblyman in the Regular Batasang Pambansa and Congressman of the Lone District of Benguet in the House of Representatives of the Philippines from 1987 to 1995 and from 2001 to 2010.

== Legacy ==
The headquarters of the Philippine National Police in the Cordillera Administrative Region, located in La Trinidad, was renamed in his honor, from its former name of Camp Holmes. A street in Baguio was also named after him, while the Acop-Tublay-Kapangan-Kibungan-Bakun-Sinipsip-Buguias secondary national road, an important transportation artery in Benguet, was renamed the Governor Bado Dangwa National Road in 2018.

Dangwa also indirectly gave his name to the Dangwa flower market in Sampaloc, Manila, which grew around the site of his transport company's terminal where produce from Benguet such as vegetables and flowers destined for the capital were unloaded.
