= Benguet–Kōchi Sisterhood Park =

Park in Benguet, Philippines

- Interactive map of Benguet–Kōchi Sisterhood Park
- Location: Atok, Benguet, Philippines
- Coordinates: 16°37′40.3″N 120°45′28.2″E
- Elevation: 2,300 meters (7,500 ft)
- Created: 2016
- Founder: Edward Haight; Hiromi Yoshikawa

The Benguet–Kōchi Sisterhood Park is a park in barangay Paoay of the town of Atok, Benguet in the Philippines.

== History ==
The park was established in 2016 to commemorate the 40th anniversary of the relations of the Philippine province of Benguet with the Japanese prefecture of Kōchi. It is situated in barangay Paoay on a land owned by the Haight clan at 2,300 meters (7,500 ft) above sea level. The area where the park is located is known as a place for cultivating highland vegetables. It was founded by farmer Edward Haight and Japanese national Hiromi Yoshikawa.

Japanese botanists scouted several areas of the province to grow cherry blossom trees to commemorate the ties between the two localities. The Kabayan portion of Mount Pulag, Madaymen in Kibungan and Timbac in Atok were among the places considered by the botanists for the tree planting. At least a hundred cherry blossom trees were propagated in November 2015 but only a few of them survived due to the timing of the planting.

At least thirty cherry blossom trees were planted in the park in June 2016. It is projected that the site will be a future destination for tourists when the cherry blossoms start to bloom in the coming years. The first blooming of the trees were reported in May 2017. The cherry blossom trees attained full bloom in August 2025.

== Flora ==
The park hosts at least two varieties of cherry blossoms; Yokiwari and Sindaya. Yokiwari trees produces pink blossoms while Sindaya produces white flowers. The cherry blossoms were grown from seed and grafts originating from the Kōchi Prefecture.
