= Melchor Diclas =

Filipino politician

The Honorable Melchor Daguines Diclas
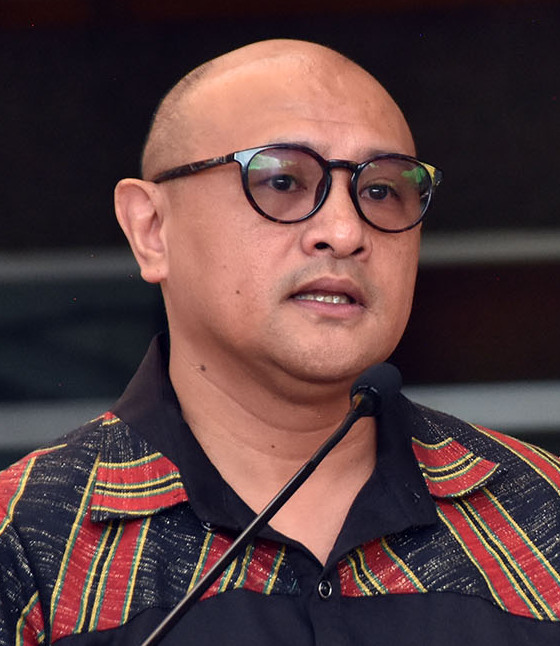

20th Governor of Benguet
- Incumbent
- Assumed office June 30, 2019
- Vice Governor: Johnny Waguis (2019–2022); Ericson Felipe (2022–2025); Marie Rose Fongwan-Kepes (since 2025)
- Preceded by: Crescencio Pacalso

Mayor of Buguias
- In office June 30, 2010 – June 30, 2016
- Preceded by: Felicio Bayacsan
- Succeeded by: Ruben Tinda-an

Vice Mayor of Buguias
- In office June 30, 2007 – June 30, 2010

Personal details
- Born: March 18, 1973 (age 53) Buguias, Benguet, Philippines
- Party: Lakas-CMD (2024–present)
- Other political affiliations: PDP (2018–2024); NUP (2012–2018); Nacionalista (2009–2012); Independent (2007–2009)
- Spouse: Ever Kigangan Diclas
- Education: Saint Louis University
- Occupation: Medical practitioner, general surgeon

Melchor Daguines Diclas (born March 18, 1973) is a Filipino politician and physician who has been the governor of Benguet since 2019. A member of Partido Demokratiko Pilipino, Diclas previously served as vice mayor of Buguias from 2007 to 2010, and then as mayor from 2010 to 2016.

== Early life and education ==
Diclas was born on March 18, 1973, in Buguias, Benguet, to Virgilio Diclas and Cecelia Daguines. He is the second of five children. He completed his elementary education at Natubleng Elementary School and his secondary education at San Jose High School in La Trinidad, as well as Saint Paul’s Academy in Atok.

He attended Saint Louis University in Baguio, graduating in 1992 with a Bachelor of Science degree in biology. That same year, he was elected chairman of the Sangguniang Kabataan in his home barangay of Natubleng, Buguias.

Diclas then continued his studies at the same university, graduating in 1997 with a Doctor of Medicine degree. During his time there, in 1996, he was elected governor of the student council of SLU's College of Medicine and president of Samahang Medicina, the college's student organization.

Diclas passed the Physician Licensure Examination in August 1998. From 2001 to 2004, he completed his specialty training in general surgery at Baguio General Hospital Medical Center. He later specialized in hepatobiliary and pancreatic surgery at the University of the Philippines – Philippine General Hospital.

Diclas also completed a Master in Management, Major in Hospital Administration, at the Philippine Christian University in 2022. In September 2026, he completed the Leadership in Medicine: Asia Pacific (LIM AP), a 12-month postgraduate certificate program in health leadership conducted by Harvard Medical School from October 2025 to September 2026. The program combined in-person and online learning sessions and workshops focused on leadership in medicine and the healthcare context of the Asia-Pacific region. He received his Certificate of Completion on September 25, 2026 at Harvard Medical School in Boston, Massachusetts.

== Career ==
After graduating and passing the Physician Licensure Examination, Diclas worked as a Medical Officer III at Eduardo Joson Memorial Hospital in Cabanatuan, Nueva Ecija, in 2000. He later transferred to Baguio General Hospital Medical Center, where he served as a Medical Officer III in the General Surgery Department.

He also worked as a surgical consultant at various hospitals within the province of Benguet, including Lutheran Hospital Inc. in Buguias; Atok District Hospital; and Pines City Doctors’ Hospital in Baguio. From 2017 to 2018, he was the medical consultant of Baguio General Hospital Medical Center before transitioning to a political career.

Diclas is a fellow of Philippine College of Surgeons and Fellow Society of General Surgeons.

=== Politics ===
In 2007, Diclas ran for vice mayor of his hometown of Buguias. After serving one term, he ran for mayor in 2010 and was re-elected in 2013. During his tenure as mayor, Buguias received the Seal of Good Housekeeping in 2011 and the Seal of Good Financial Housekeeping in 2014 from the Department of the Interior and Local Government.

In the 2016 election, Diclas ran for governor of Benguet under the National Unity Party, as part of the slate of then-incumbent governor Nestor Fongwan, who was term-limited and running for Congress. Diclas placed third in the race, losing to former vice governor Crescensio Pacalso.

Diclas ran again for governor in 2019, this time under PDP-Laban. He and his running mate for vice governor, Johnny Waguis, unseated the incumbents Pacalso and Florence Tingbaoen, who were both seeking reelection. He campaigned on a platform aimed at enhancing health services and hospital facilities, providing essential educational services, promoting the production of safe vegetables, and supporting research to improve agricultural products. He also pledged support for the small-scale mining sector and sports development.

Diclas ran for reelection in 2022 and won with 112,345 votes, representing 57.62% of the total votes cast.

Under the LAKAS-CMD Party, Diclas ran for his third and final term as governor in 2025 and won, receiving 116,212 votes. [reference: https://benguet.gov.ph/diclas-wins-final-term-as-benguet-governor-with-over-116k-votes/5/]

== Personal life ==
He is married to Ever Kigangan from Kabayan, Benguet. They have three children.
