= Samuel Dangwa =

Filipino politician

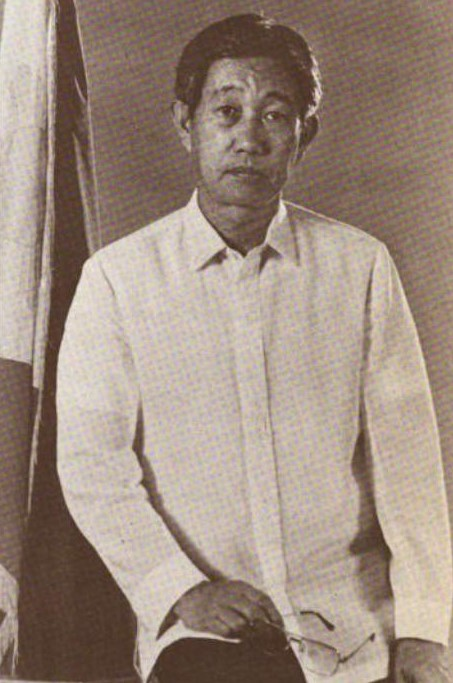
- Dangwa official portrait during the 8th Congress.

Member of the Philippine House of Representatives from Benguet's Lone District
- In office June 30, 2001 – June 30, 2010
- Preceded by: Ronald Cosalan
- Succeeded by: Ronald Cosalan

Member of the Philippine House of Representatives from Benguet's Second District
- In office June 30, 1987 – June 30, 1995
- Preceded by: Post created
- Succeeded by: Post dissolved

Mambabatas Pambansa (Assemblyman) from Benguet
- In office June 30, 1984 – March 25, 1986

Vice Governor of Benguet
- In office January 1, 1972 – March 3, 1980

Personal details
- Born: October 19, 1935 Kapangan, Mountain Province, Philippine Islands
- Died: April 3, 2019 (aged 83)
- Party: Independent (1984–1987; 2009–2019)
- Other political affiliations: Lakas–CMD (2004–2009); Reporma (2001–2004); LDP (1988–2001); Lakas ng Bansa (1987–1988)

Samuel Martin Dangwa (born October 19, 1935 - April 3, 2019) was a Filipino lawyer and politician.

== Political career ==
He was elected to five terms as a Member of the House of Representatives, representing the defunct 2nd District of Benguet from 1987 to 1995, and the Lone District of Benguet from 2001 to 2010. He was a member of the Lakas–CMD.

A lawyer by profession, Dangwa had also served as Vice-Governor of Benguet from 1972 to 1980, and Assemblyman from Benguet in the Regular Batasang Pambansa from 1984 to 1986.

In 2022, the Sandiganbayan dropped the charges filed against Dangwa in connection to the pork barrel scam.

== Personal life and death ==
Dangwa was a nephew of Bado Dangwa, who served as Governor of Benguet from 1953 to 1963 and was the founder of the Dangwa Transportation Company, one of the leading bus transportation firms in the northern Philippines. Samuel's son, Nelson, also served as vice governor of Benguet.

In 2019, Dangwa died from an unspecified illness.

House of Representatives of the Philippines
Preceded by newly created	Representative, 2nd District of Benguet; 1987–1995	Succeeded by abolished
Preceded by Ronald M. Cosalan	Lone District of Benguet; 2001–present	Succeeded by Incumbent
