= Benguet's at-large congressional district =

At-large Philippine legislative district for Benguet

- Constituency for the House of Representatives of the Philippines
- Location of Benguet within the Philippines
- Province: Benguet
- Region: Cordillera Administrative Region
- Population: 473,190 (2024)
- Electorate: 416,145 (2025)
- Area: 2,769.08 km^{2} (1,069.15 sq mi)

Current constituency
- Created: 1966
- Representative: Eric Yap
- Created from: Mountain Province's 2nd congressional district
- Political party: Lakas–CMD
- Congressional bloc: Majority

Benguet's at-large congressional district is the sole congressional district of the Philippines for the province of Benguet. The district was created ahead of the 1969 House elections after the former Mountain Province was divided into the provinces of Benguet, Mountain Province, Ifugao, and Kalinga-Apayao in 1966. It has been represented in the House of Representatives since the 7th Congress from 1969 to 1972, in the Regular Batasang Pambansa, the unicameral parliament that replaced the House of Representatives from 1984 to 1986, and in the restored House from the 10th Congress onwards.

The district served as an electoral district in the 1971 Constitutional Convention, with two delegates representing Benguet at-large.

From 1987 to 1995, the district was designated as Benguet's 2nd congressional district, while Baguio City constituted Benguet's 1st congressional district. In 1995, the 1st district was redesignated as Baguio's at-large congressional district, and the 2nd district became Benguet's lone district. It is currently represented in the 20th Congress by Eric Yap of Lakas–CMD.

== Recent election results from province-wide races ==
Year	Office	Results
2022	President	Bongbong Marcos (PFP) 80.94%
2022	Vice President	Sara Duterte (Lakas) 72.86%
2022	Governor	Melchor Diclas (PDP–Laban) 57.61%
2025	Governor	Melchor Diclas (Lakas) 52.04%

== List of members representing the district ==
=== House of Representatives (1945–1973) ===
Portrait	Member	Term of office		Legislature	Party	Electoral history	Constituent LGUs
Portrait	Member	Start	End	Legislature	Party	Electoral history	Constituent LGUs
District created June 18, 1966, from Mountain Province's 2nd district.
	Andres Cosalan	December 30, 1969	January 17, 1973	7th Congress	Nacionalista	Re-elected in 1969. Term cut short upon the ratification of a new Constitution.	1969–1973; Atok, Bakun, Baguio, Bokod, Buguias, Itogon, Kabayan, Kapangan, Kibungan, La Trinidad, Mankayan, Sablan, Tuba, Tublay
District dissolved into the twelve-seat Region I's at-large district for the Interim Batasang Pambansa.

=== 1971 Constitutional Convention (1971–1972) ===
Seat A						Seat B						Legislature	Constituent LGUs
Portrait	Member	Term of office		Party	Electoral history	Portrait	Member	Term of office		Party	Electoral history	Legislature	Constituent LGUs
Portrait	Member	Start	End	Party	Electoral history	Portrait	Member	Start	End	Party	Electoral history	Legislature	Constituent LGUs
	Fernando Bautista	June 1, 1971	November 29, 1972	Nonpartisan	Elected in 1970.		Floro Bugnosen	June 1, 1971	November 29, 1972	Nonpartisan	Elected in 1970.	1971 Constitutional Convention	1971–1972; Atok, Bakun, Baguio, Bokod, Buguias, Itogon, Kabayan, Kapangan, Kibungan, La Trinidad, Mankayan, Sablan, Tuba, Tublay

=== Batasang Pambansa (1978–1986) ===
Portrait	Member	Term of office		Legislature	Party	Electoral history	Constituent LGUs
Portrait	Member	Start	End	Legislature	Party	Electoral history	Constituent LGUs
District re-created February 1, 1984.
	Samuel Dangwa	June 30, 1984	March 25, 1986	Regular Batasang Pambansa	Independent	Elected in 1984.	1984–1986; Atok, Bakun, Bokod, Buguias, Itogon, Kabayan, Kapangan, Kibungan, La Trinidad, Mankayan, Sablan, Tuba, Tublay

=== House of Representatives (1987–present) ===
==== As Benguet's 2nd district ====
Portrait	Member	Term of office		Legislature	Party	Electoral history	Constituent LGUs
Portrait	Member	Start	End	Legislature	Party	Electoral history	Constituent LGUs
District re-created February 2, 1987.
	Samuel Dangwa	June 30, 1987	June 30, 1995	8th Congress	LnB	Elected in 1987.	1987–1995 Atok, Bakun, Bokod, Buguias, Itogon, Kabayan, Kapangan, Kibungan, La Trinidad, Mankayan, Sablan, Tuba, Tublay
	Samuel Dangwa	June 30, 1987	June 30, 1995	8th Congress	LDP	Elected in 1987.	1987–1995 Atok, Bakun, Bokod, Buguias, Itogon, Kabayan, Kapangan, Kibungan, La Trinidad, Mankayan, Sablan, Tuba, Tublay
	Samuel Dangwa	June 30, 1987	June 30, 1995	9th Congress	LDP	Re-elected in 1992.	1987–1995 Atok, Bakun, Bokod, Buguias, Itogon, Kabayan, Kapangan, Kibungan, La Trinidad, Mankayan, Sablan, Tuba, Tublay
District designated as Benguet's at-large district.

==== As Benguet's at-large district ====
Portrait	Member	Term of office		Legislature	Party	Electoral history	Constituent LGUs
Portrait	Member	Start	End	Legislature	Party	Electoral history	Constituent LGUs
	Ronald Cosalan	June 30, 1995	June 30, 2004	10th Congress	Lakas	Elected in 1995.	1995–present Atok, Bakun, Bokod, Buguias, Itogon, Kabayan, Kapangan, Kibungan, La Trinidad, Mankayan, Sablan, Tuba, Tublay
	Ronald Cosalan	June 30, 1995	June 30, 2004	11th Congress	Lakas	Re-elected in 1998.	1995–present Atok, Bakun, Bokod, Buguias, Itogon, Kabayan, Kapangan, Kibungan, La Trinidad, Mankayan, Sablan, Tuba, Tublay
	Samuel Dangwa	June 30, 2004	June 30, 2010	12th Congress	Reporma–LM	Elected in 2001.	1995–present Atok, Bakun, Bokod, Buguias, Itogon, Kabayan, Kapangan, Kibungan, La Trinidad, Mankayan, Sablan, Tuba, Tublay
	Samuel Dangwa	June 30, 2004	June 30, 2010	13th Congress	Lakas	Re-elected in 2004.	1995–present Atok, Bakun, Bokod, Buguias, Itogon, Kabayan, Kapangan, Kibungan, La Trinidad, Mankayan, Sablan, Tuba, Tublay
	Samuel Dangwa	June 30, 2004	June 30, 2010	14th Congress	Lakas	Re-elected in 2007.	1995–present Atok, Bakun, Bokod, Buguias, Itogon, Kabayan, Kapangan, Kibungan, La Trinidad, Mankayan, Sablan, Tuba, Tublay
	Ronald Cosalan	June 30, 2010	June 30, 2019	15th Congress	Liberal	Elected in 2010.	1995–present Atok, Bakun, Bokod, Buguias, Itogon, Kabayan, Kapangan, Kibungan, La Trinidad, Mankayan, Sablan, Tuba, Tublay
	Ronald Cosalan	June 30, 2010	June 30, 2019	16th Congress	Liberal	Re-elected in 2013.	1995–present Atok, Bakun, Bokod, Buguias, Itogon, Kabayan, Kapangan, Kibungan, La Trinidad, Mankayan, Sablan, Tuba, Tublay
	Ronald Cosalan	June 30, 2010	June 30, 2019	17th Congress	PDP–Laban	Re-elected in 2016.	1995–present Atok, Bakun, Bokod, Buguias, Itogon, Kabayan, Kapangan, Kibungan, La Trinidad, Mankayan, Sablan, Tuba, Tublay
	Nestor Fongwan	June 30, 2019	December 18, 2019	18th Congress	PDP–Laban	Elected in 2019. Died in office.	1995–present Atok, Bakun, Bokod, Buguias, Itogon, Kabayan, Kapangan, Kibungan, La Trinidad, Mankayan, Sablan, Tuba, Tublay
Vacant		December 18, 2019	June 30, 2022	18th Congress	—	Eric Yap designated as caretaker. No special election held to fill vacancy.	1995–present Atok, Bakun, Bokod, Buguias, Itogon, Kabayan, Kapangan, Kibungan, La Trinidad, Mankayan, Sablan, Tuba, Tublay
	Eric Yap	June 30, 2022	Incumbent	19th Congress	Lakas (United Benguet Party)	Elected in 2022.	1995–present Atok, Bakun, Bokod, Buguias, Itogon, Kabayan, Kapangan, Kibungan, La Trinidad, Mankayan, Sablan, Tuba, Tublay
	Eric Yap	June 30, 2022	Incumbent	20th Congress	Lakas (United Benguet Party)	Re-elected in 2025.	1995–present Atok, Bakun, Bokod, Buguias, Itogon, Kabayan, Kapangan, Kibungan, La Trinidad, Mankayan, Sablan, Tuba, Tublay

== Election results ==
=== 1984 ===
1984 Philippine parliamentary election in Benguet
Party	Candidate	Votes	%
Nacionalista	Samuel Dangwa	65,153	61.91
KBL	Andres Cosalan	40,082	38.09

=== 1992 ===
1992 Philippine House of Representatives elections in Benguet
Party	Candidate	Votes	%
LDP	Samuel Dangwa (incumbent)	47,309	50.36
NPC/Nacionalista/KBL	Raul Molintas	46,432	49.42
Independent	Bedis Guznian	206	0.22
Total votes		93,947	100.00
LDP hold			

=== 1995 ===
1995 Philippine House of Representatives elections in Benguet
Party	Candidate	Votes	%
Lakas	Ronald Cosalan	50,544	53.80
Lakas	Samuel Dangwa (incumbent)	45,487	48.42
Independent	Julio Bantali	2,674	2.85
Independent	Diosdado Ringor	135	0.14
LM	Bedis Guznian	63	0.07
Total votes		93,947	100.00
Lakas hold			

=== 1998 ===
1998 Philippine House of Representatives elections in Benguet
Party	Candidate	Votes	%
Lakas	Ronald Cosalan (incumbent)	50,555	44.79
LAMMP	Samuel Dangwa	40,674	36.03
Reporma	Jaime Paul Panganiban	20,281	17.97
PDP–Laban	Bial Pelaez	1,294	1.15
LM	Bedis Guznian	79	0.07
Total votes		112,883	100.00
Lakas hold			

=== 2010 ===
2010 Philippine House of Representatives elections in Benguet
Party	Candidate	Votes	%
Liberal	Ronald Cosalan	48,732	33.37
Nacionalista	Jack Dulnuan	37,992	26.02
PDP–Laban	Liso Agpas	30,888	21.15
Lakas–Kampi	Mario Godio	20,075	13.75
Independent	Ricardo Angluben	6,178	4.23
Independent	Thomas Chamos	1,945	1.33
Independent	Bedis Guznian	210	0.14
Total votes		146,020	100.00
Liberal gain from Lakas–Kampi			

=== 2013 ===
2013 Philippine House of Representatives elections in Benguet
Party	Candidate	Votes	%
Liberal	Ronald Cosalan (incumbent)	56,494	55.44
NUP	Crescencio Pacalso	45,070	44.23
Independent	Munar Renan	341	0.33
Total votes		101,905	100.00
Liberal hold			

=== 2016 ===
2016 Philippine House of Representatives elections in Benguet
Party	Candidate	Votes	%
Liberal	Ronald Cosalan (incumbent)	87,445	52.59
NUP	Nestor Fongwan	78,822	47.41
Total votes		166,267	100.00
Liberal hold			

=== 2019 ===
2019 Philippine House of Representatives elections in Benguet
Party	Candidate	Votes	%
PDP–Laban	Nestor Fongwan	130,026	76.18
Lakas	Materno Luspian	25,613	15.01
Independent	Thorrsson Keith	15,051	8.82
Total votes		170,690	100.00
PDP–Laban hold			

=== 2022 ===
2022 Philippine House of Representatives elections in Benguet
Party	Candidate	Votes	%
United Benguet Party	Eric Yap	123,801	61.40
KBL	Victorio Palangdan	71,200	35.31
Independent	Sammy Paran	4,457	2.21
Independent	Thorrsson Keith	2,162	1.07
Total votes		201,620	100.00
United Benguet Party gain from PDP–Laban			

=== 2025 ===
2025 Philippine House of Representatives elections in Benguet
Party	Candidate	Votes	%
Lakas	Eric Yap (incumbent)	144,093	69.43
PFP	Tagel Felipe	62,371	30.23
Independent	Jerome Wakat	765	0.37
Independent	Bok Mistah Siddayao	312	0.15
Total votes		207,541	100.00
Lakas hold			

== See also ==
- Legislative districts of Benguet
