= Philippine House Committee on Poverty Alleviation =

Standing committee of the House of Representatives of the Philippines

Committee on Poverty Alleviation
- 20th Congress

History
- New session started: To convene on July 28, 2025

Leadership
- Chairman: Vacant
- Minority Leader: Vacant

Website
- Committee on Poverty Alleviation

The Philippine House Committee on Poverty Alleviation, or House Poverty Alleviation Committee is a standing committee of the Philippine House of Representatives.

== Jurisdiction ==
As prescribed by House Rules, the committee's jurisdiction is on the policies and programs that will tackle the poverty situation and similar measures on poverty alleviation including the promotion of the poor's right to equal access to opportunities for a better quality of life.

== Members, 20th Congress ==
As of June 30, 2025, all committee membership positions are vacant until the House convenes for its first regular session on July 28.

== Historical membership rosters ==
=== 18th Congress ===
Position	Members	Party	Province/City	District
Chairperson	Dahlia A. Loyola	PDP–Laban	Cavite	5th
Vice Chairpersons	Domingo Rivera	CIBAC	Party-list	
Vice Chairpersons	Shernee Tan	Kusug Tausug	Party-list	
Vice Chairpersons	Ma. Fe Abunda	PDP–Laban	Eastern Samar	Lone
Vice Chairpersons	Juliet Marie Ferrer	NUP	Negros Occidental	4th
Vice Chairpersons	Ansaruddin Abdul Malik Adiong	Nacionalista	Lanao del Sur	1st
Vice Chairpersons	Tyrone Agabas	NPC	Pangasinan	6th
Members for the Majority	Paul Daza	Liberal	Northern Samar	1st
Members for the Majority	Manuel Cabochan	MAGDALO	Party-list	
Members for the Majority	Yedda Marie Romualdez	Tingog Sinirangan	Party-list	
Members for the Majority	Raymond Democrito Mendoza	TUCP	Party-list	
Members for the Majority	Manuel Luis Lopez	NPC	Manila	1st
Members for the Majority	Geraldine Roman	PDP–Laban	Bataan	1st
Members for the Majority	Jumel Anthony Espino	PDP–Laban	Pangasinan	2nd
Members for the Majority	Ria Christina Fariñas	PDP–Laban	Ilocos Norte	1st
Members for the Majority	Jonathan Keith Flores	PDP–Laban	Bukidnon	2nd
Members for the Majority	Wilton Kho	PDP–Laban	Masbate	3rd
Members for the Majority	Edward Maceda	PMP	Manila	4th
Members for the Majority	Eric Martinez	PDP–Laban	Valenzuela	2nd
Members for the Majority	John Marvin Nieto	NUP	Manila	3rd
Members for the Majority	Romeo Jalosjos Jr.	Nacionalista	Zamboanga del Norte	1st
Members for the Majority	Rolando Valeriano	NUP	Manila	2nd
Members for the Majority	Florencio Noel	An Waray	Party-list	
Members for the Majority	Anthony Peter Crisologo	NUP	Quezon City	1st
Members for the Majority	Romulo Peña Jr.	Liberal	Makati	1st
Members for the Majority	Elizalde Co	AKO BICOL	Party-list	
Members for the Minority	Irene Gay Saulog	KALINGA	Party-list	
Members for the Minority	Ma. Victoria A. Umali	A TEACHER	Party-list	

==== Member for the Majority ====
- Nestor Fongwan (Note: Died on December 18, 2019.) (Benguet–Lone, PDP–Laban)

== See also ==
- House of Representatives of the Philippines
- List of Philippine House of Representatives committees
- National Anti-Poverty Commission
