= Camp Holmes Internment Camp =

Internment camp in Benguet, Philippines

Camp Holmes
- Concentration camp
- Location within Luzon Location within Philippines
- Coordinates: 16°27′56″N 120°35′55″E
- Other names: Camp #3; Baguio Internment Camp
- Location: La Trinidad, Benguet, Japanese-occupied Philippines
- Original use: Philippine Constabulary base
- Operational: 1941–1945

Camp Holmes Internment Camp, also known as Camp #3 and Baguio Internment Camp, near Baguio in the Philippines was established in World War II by the Japanese to intern civilians from countries hostile to Japan. The camp housed about 500 civilians, mostly Americans, between April 1942 and December 1944 when the internees were moved to Bilibid Prison in Manila. Camp Holmes was a Philippine Constabulary base before World War II; it was later renamed Camp Bado Dangwa and became the regional headquarters of the Philippine National Police in the Cordillera region. It is located near what is now the Halsema Highway.

== Background ==
The American military base of Camp John Hay in Baguio was the first place in the Philippines bombed by the Japanese on December 8, 1941. On December 27, Japanese forces captured Baguio virtually unopposed by American and Filipino forces. The 500 American and other civilians resident in the city were first interned at Camp John Hay. On April 23, 1942 the Westerners and 300 Chinese internees were moved by bus to Camp Holmes, about 8 kilometres (5.0 mi) north of Baguio and Camp John Hay.

During the internees stay at Camp Hay, three men were arrested by the Japanese and accused of being spies. Two of them were later released but Rufus Gray, a Southern Baptist missionary, died or was executed by the Japanese while imprisoned.

== Environment and internees ==
Camp Holmes is in a subtropical highland area with an elevation of nearly 1,400 metres (4,600 ft). Before the war, the area was popular among Americans as a Hill station to escape the heat and disease of the lowland tropics. Conditions for internees at Camp Holmes were generally better than at other internment camps in the Philippines, although shortages of food and medicine and crowded living conditions were problems.

Living facilities for the internees consisted of three barracks. The Chinese were housed in one two-story barracks; Western women and children were housed on the second floor of the second barracks, with the kitchen and dining room on the first floor. The third barracks of one story housed the Western men. At the insistence of the Japanese, the internees built wire fences between the barracks to separate the men from the women. The Japanese allocated a one-story house on the premises to mothers with children. It was near a makeshift hospital. The camp was partially enclosed by a chicken wire fence. The Japanese forbade communication between the Western and the Chinese internees, who were released in May 1942, freeing up additional living space for the Western internees. At the same time, the Japanese also released a number of elderly American residents of Baguio who were permitted to live outside the camp, although with restrictions on their movements.

About 40 percent of the Western internees were missionaries from 22 different denominations of which the Seventh-day Adventists were the most numerous. The remaining sixty percent of internees included a large contingent of miners as many gold and other mines were in the region. The Japanese commander appointed Elmer Herold, the general manager of a lumber company which was the largest employer in Baguio, as its liaison officer to the internees and his wife, Ethel Herold, became the unofficial leader of the women. Several of the Japanese employed at the camp were former employees of Herold.

A census of the internees on January 1, 1944 counted 480, including 217 males, and 263 females of whom 388 were American, 72 were British or Commonwealth, and 20 were Filipino Mestizos and others. Of the adult males, 65 had previously been engaged in mining or forestry, 49 were missionaries (missionary women and wives outnumbered men by almost two to one), and 41 were businessmen and others.

== Life at Camp Holmes ==
Shortly after the move to Camp Holmes the Japanese relaxed the rules for internees and until stricter rules were imposed in February 1944, the internees concurred that conditions were "not too bad." Food, consisting mostly of rice, bananas, and sweet potatoes, was adequate, albeit barely, and limited in variety. The principal emotion felt by the internees was boredom. Dysentery was the principal health problem.

The internees were mostly self-governing. The Japanese appointed an Executive Committee, called the "General Committee" or "men's committee" to manage the camp which, in turn, appointed a "women's committee." The two committees quickly became elective, although women did not have the right to vote for the members of the General Committee. A brusque surgeon, Dr. Dana Nance, was the initial head of the men's committee and Ethel Herold, equally brusque, the head of the women's committee. The men's committee had veto rights over the women's committee. In 1943, women's suffrage was put to a vote with 181 in favor and 168 opposed—but the men's committee refused to honor the results, stating that the Japanese would not approve of women voting. Women continued to be denied the right to vote for members of the all-male General Committee. The women's suffrage issue was a symptom of camp politics and political rivalry between Nance and Dr. Beulah Ream Allen. Both were transferred by the Japanese to other internment camps later in 1943. Liaison with the Japanese authorities was through Elmer Herold and Nellie McKim, a missionary who spoke high-status Japanese and used her diplomatic skills to resolve problems between the Japanese and the internees.

Japanese policy was to keep men and women separated and cohabitation was prohibited. Girls and boys under 10 years of age lived with their mothers. This policy broke down over time and several babies were born during the internment years.

Camp Holmes was run by its internees on a communal basis with every internee assigned a task. In the prominent Halsema family, E.J. Halsema, former mayor of Baguio, swatted flies and mopped floors; his wife Marie prepared vegetables for cooking; married daughter Betty Foley prepared baby food, washed clothes, and supervised school study halls; her husband, Rupert, cut and hauled firewood; and brother James Halsema, a graduate of Duke University, edited a daily news summary and helped push a garbage wagon. “…work assignments followed an elaborate ‘Master Sheet’, drawn up by internee Gus Skerl, that would have done credit to the operational studies of a major corporation." Dr. Augustus (Gus) Skerl, a British mining geologist, also grew yeast on banana skins gleaned from the garbage to provide vitamin B to those suffering from beri-beri. When soap ran short, Skerl made soap from alkali derived from peanut shells.

An event which bolstered both the health and the morale of the internees was the arrival of Red Cross food boxes in December 1943. Each internee received one food box weighing 21 kilograms (46 lb) and packed with a large variety of foodstuffs. The Japanese camp commander, Captain Rokuro Tomibe, was praised by the internees for his efforts to retrieve the food boxes from a warehouse in Manila and arranging their transport to Camp Holmes.

In April 1944, two internees escaped from Camp Holmes. The Japanese Kempeitai tortured three internees to attempt to get information about the escapees and eliminated some of the privileges they had granted the internees. The Japanese halted most commerce in food and other items between the internees and the local Filipino community and forced internees to build a fence around Camp Holmes. Tomibe was later relieved of his duties as camp commander.

As the war began to go badly for the Japanese, conditions became worse and by October 1944, internees wrote a letter to Japanese authorities appealing for more food to avoid starvation. With the Allied invasion of the Philippines by the combined American and Filipino ground forces, the Japanese wanted to use the barracks at Camp Holmes for their soldiers and in late December 1944, trucked all the internees at Camp Holmes to a new home within the high walls of Bilibid Prison in Manila. There, they resided under very difficult conditions until liberated on February 4, 1945 by American soldiers engaged in expelling the Japanese army from Manila.

== Aftermath ==
After World War II, Tomibe was arrested for being a suspected war criminal. James Halsema and Robert Sheridan, the only Catholic priest at Camp Holmes, wrote letters to U.S. authorities offering to testify on his behalf. The charges against Tomibe were dropped. The former internees have had several reunions, one in 1977 in which Tomibe was the guest of honor.

Several factors influenced the relatively benign conditions at Camp Holmes compared to other internment camps. The camp was small compared to, for example, Santo Tomas Internment Camp in Manila. The community was cohesive with recognized leaders and organized in a democratic but communal manner in which the internees were mostly equal and all had assigned tasks to perform. The "have nots" including women with children fared better at Camp Holmes than they did at Santo Tomas. Japanese management of the camp was more lenient than at other camps.
