= Nestor Fongwan =

Filipino politician (1951–2019)

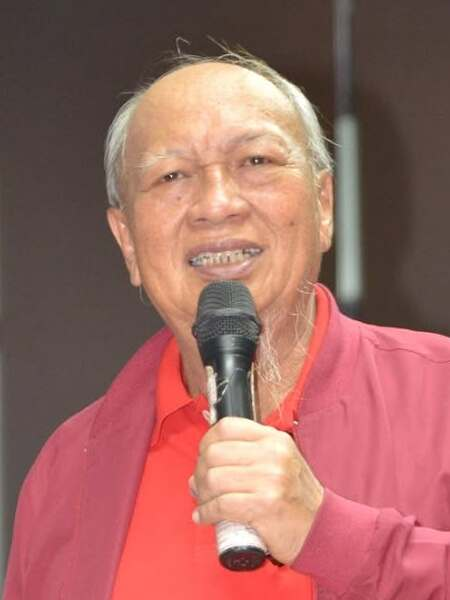
- Fongwan in 2019

Member of Philippine House of Representatives for Benguet's at-large district
- In office June 30, 2019 – December 18, 2019
- Preceded by: Ronald Cosalan
- Succeeded by: Eric Yap

18th Governor of Benguet
- In office June 30, 2007 – June 30, 2016
- Vice Governor: Crescencio Pacalso (2007–2013); Nelson Dangwa (2013–2016)
- Preceded by: Borromeo Melchor
- Succeeded by: Crescencio Pacalso

Mayor of La Trinidad
- In office June 30, 1998 – June 30, 2007
- Vice Mayor: John Botiwey (1998–2001); Artemio Galwan (2001–2007)
- Preceded by: Cecil Digman
- Succeeded by: Artemio Galwan

Vice Mayor of La Trinidad
- In office June 30, 1992 – June 30, 1995
- Mayor: Edna Tabanda
- Preceded by: Elmer Costina
- Succeeded by: James Chanfing

Member of the La Trinidad Municipal Council
- In office February 2, 1988 – June 30, 1992

Personal details
- Born: June 12, 1951 La Trinidad, Benguet, Philippines
- Died: December 18, 2019 (aged 68) Quezon City, Philippines
- Party: PDP–Laban (2018–2019)
- Other political affiliations: NUP (2012–2018); Lakas (2009–2012); KAMPI (2006–2009); NPC (1997–2006)
- Spouse: Priscilla Fongwan
- Children: 5
- Education: University of Baguio

Nestor Bagtang Fongwan Sr. (June 12, 1951 – December 18, 2019) was a Filipino politician who served as the representative for Benguet's at-large congressional district in the Philippine House of Representatives from June 2019 until his death in December of the same year. He previously served as governor of Benguet from 2007 to 2016.

== Early life and education ==
Nestor Bagtang Fongwan was born on June 12, 1951, in La Trinidad, Benguet, to a Chinese immigrant who worked as a farmer in the town. He attended high school and later earned a degree in accountancy and a Master of Business Administration from the University of Baguio.

== Early career (1988–1995) ==
Fongwan entered politics in 1988 as a municipal councilor of La Trinidad, serving until 1992, when he was elected vice mayor of the town.

== Mayor of La Trinidad (1998–2007) ==
Fongwan was later elected mayor of La Trinidad in 1998 and re-elected in 2001 and 2004 under the Nationalist People's Coalition, serving until 2007.

== Governor of Benguet (2007–2016) ==
In 2007, Fongwan ran for governor of Benguet under Kabalikat ng Mamamayang Pilipino, defeating incumbent Borromeo Melchor with 55,802 votes (45.24%). He was re-elected in 2010 under Lakas–CMD and in 2013 under the National Unity Party (NUP). As governor, Fongwan championed projects to improve the province's agricultural economy and earned the moniker "Action Man."

In 2014, a local resident accused Fongwan before the Office of the Ombudsman of falsifying passport documents to allegedly conceal his Chinese nationality. Fongwan denied the allegations, suspecting that the complaint was facilitated by unnamed opponents from the Liberal Party.

== Congressional bid (2016) ==
Fongwan first ran for a seat in the House of Representatives representing Benguet's at-large congressional district in 2016 under the NUP, but lost to incumbent Ronald Cosalan, who was seeking a third term.

== House of Representatives (2019) ==
In 2019, Fongwan was elected representative for Benguet's lone congressional district under PDP–Laban. He supported Alan Peter Cayetano's bid for the speakership during the opening of the 18th Congress. He was later elected vice chairperson of the House committees on Agrarian Reform, Indigenous Cultural Communities and Indigenous Peoples, and Natural Resources, and served as a member of 11 other committees as part of the majority bloc. During his term as representative, he principally authored 21 legislative measures focused on local growth and development. He and other Cordillera lawmakers filed House Bill No. 5687, which sought to establish the Autonomous Region of the Cordillera.

=== Committee membership ===
==== 18th Congress ====
- Committee on Agrarian Reform (Vice Chair)
- Committee on Indigenous Cultural Communities and Indigenous Peoples (Vice Chair)
- Committee on Natural Resources (Vice Chair)
- Committee on Agriculture and Food
- Committee on Appropriations
- Committee on Banks and Financial Intermediaries
- Committee on Dangerous Drugs
- Committee on Disaster Resilience
- Special Committee on Food Security
- Committee on Local Government
- Committee on Overseas Workers Affairs
- Committee on Poverty Alleviation
- Committee on Science And Technology
- Special Committee on Senior Citizens

== Death ==
Fongwan died on December 18, 2019, at the age of 68 from acute respiratory failure while staying at the National Kidney and Transplant Institute. He was buried at the family residence in Puguis, La Trinidad, on December 28, 2019. ACT-CIS Partylist representative Eric Yap was appointed caretaker of the district until he was elected its representative in 2022.

== Personal life ==
Fongwan was married to Priscilla Fongwan, with whom he had five children.

== Electoral history ==
Electoral history of Nestor Fongwan
Year	Office	Party	Votes received				Result
Year	Office	Party	Total	%	P.	Swing	Result
1988	Councilor (La Trinidad)	Unknown	—N/a	—N/a	—N/a	—N/a	Won
1992	Vice Mayor of La Trinidad	Unknown	—N/a	—N/a	1st	—N/a	Won
1998	Mayor of La Trinidad	NPC	—N/a	—N/a	1st	—N/a	Won
2001	Mayor of La Trinidad	NPC	—N/a	—N/a	1st	—N/a	Won
2004	Mayor of La Trinidad	NPC	—N/a	—N/a	1st	—N/a	Won
2007	Governor of Benguet	KAMPI	55,802	45.24%	1st	—N/a	Won
2010	Governor of Benguet	Lakas	87,618	59.05%	1st	+13.81	Won
2013	Governor of Benguet	NUP	108,950	73.85%	1st	+14.80	Won
2016	Representative (Benguet)	NUP	78,822	47.41%	2nd	—N/a	Lost
2019	Representative (Benguet)	PDP–Laban	130,026	76.18%	1st	+28.77	Won

House of Representatives of the Philippines
Preceded by Ronald Cosalan	Member of the Philippine House of Representatives for Benguet's at-large district 2019	Succeeded by Eric Yap
Political offices
Preceded by Borromeo Melchor	Governor of Benguet; 2007–2016	Succeeded by Crescencio Pacalso
Preceded by Cecil Digman	Mayor of La Trinidad; 1998–2007	Succeeded by Artemio Galwan
Preceded by Elmer Costina	Vice Mayor of La Trinidad; 1992–1995	Succeeded by James Chanfing
