= Kabayan Mummies =

Group of mummies located in Benguet, Philippines

- Benguet Mummy Caves, Ibaloi Mummy Caves
- Location in Luzon Location in the Philippines
- 16°33′N 120°45′E
- Type: Burial cave
- Location: Kabayan, Benguet, Philippines

Site notes
- Management: National Museum of the Philippines

The Fire Mummies, also known as the Kabayan Mummies, Benguet Mummies, or Ibaloi Mummies, are a group of mummies found along the mountain slopes of Kabayan, Benguet, a town in the northern Philippines. They were made from as early as 2000 BCE. Today, they remain in natural caves as well as in a museum in Kabayan.

== Description ==
Some scientists believe that the Fire Mummies were created by the Ibaloi people between 1200 and 1500 CE in five towns in Benguet, and buried in caves. Others believe that they date back to as far as 2000 BCE. What makes the Fire Mummies unique is their mummification process, which would begin shortly before a person died and consisted of ingesting a very salty drink. After death, the corpse was washed and set over a fire in a seated position, drying the fluids; smoke from tobacco was blown into the mouth to dry the body's internal organs. Eventually, herbs were rubbed into the body. Mummified bodies were then placed in a coffin made of pine wood and laid to rest in rock shelters, natural caves, or artificial burial niches.

=== Discovery ===
When the Fire Mummies were uncovered by Westerners in the early 20th century, (they had been known to local communities for hundreds of years), many of them were stolen, as the caves were mostly unprotected. They were listed in the 1998 World Monuments Watch by the World Monuments Fund and declared one of the 100 most endangered sites in the world. Funding from American Express was used for emergency conservation and the creation of a comprehensive management plan.

The mummies remain in natural caves with relatively minor security. Officials claim to be aware of another 50–80 artifacts, whose locations they have chosen to keep secret. A small museum in Kabayan also displays a few mummies.

=== National Museum-Kabayan ===
In May 2024, the National Museum of the Philippines announced a PHP25 million rehabilitation of National Museum-Kabayan's Site 1, home to several female mummies. The site houses a geological collection and artifacts on local death rites and rituals, mummies, plants used in the mummification process, and Kabayan-Ibaloi items. The museum also conserves and protects the Timbac burial caves and the mummy rocks, including the "Apo Anno" mummy, a revered ancestor, in Buguias, Benguet.

== Declarations ==
The Kabayan Mummy Burial Caves are listed as National Cultural Treasures by the National Museum of the Philippines, pursuant to Presidential Decree No. 260, signed by President Ferdinand Marcos in August 1973. They are also under consideration as a UNESCO World Heritage Site.

== See also ==
- List of World Heritage Sites in the Philippines
- List of World Heritage Sites in Southeast Asia
- List of World Heritage Sites
