= Philippine House Special Committee on Senior Citizens =

Special committee of the House of Representatives of the Philippines

Special Committee on Senior Citizens
- 20th Congress

History
- New session started: To convene on July 28, 2025

Leadership
- Chairman: Vacant
- Minority Leader: Vacant

Website
- Special Committee on Senior Citizens

The Philippine House Special Committee on Senior Citizens is a special committee of the Philippine House of Representatives.

== Jurisdiction ==
As prescribed by House Rules, the committee's jurisdiction is on the needs and welfare of senior citizens as well as policies and programs that will enhance their active participation in society.

== Members, 20th Congress ==
As of June 30, 2025, all committee membership positions are vacant until the House convenes for its first regular session on July 28.

== Historical membership rosters ==
=== 18th Congress ===
Position	Members	Party	Province/City	District
Chairperson	vacant			
Vice Chairpersons	Ma. Lourdes Arroyo	Lakas	Negros Occidental	5th
Vice Chairpersons	Antonino Calixto	PDP–Laban	Pasay	Lone
Vice Chairpersons	Elpidio Barzaga Jr.	NUP	Cavite	4th
Members for the Majority	Junie Cua	PDP–Laban	Quirino	Lone
Members for the Majority	Alfred Vargas	PDP–Laban	Quezon City	5th
Members for the Majority	Eric Martinez	PDP–Laban	Valenzuela	2nd
Members for the Majority	Shirlyn Bañas-Nograles	PDP–Laban	South Cotabato	1st
Members for the Majority	Abdullah Dimaporo	NPC	Lanao del Norte	2nd
Members for the Majority	Carlito Marquez	NPC	Aklan	1st
Members for the Majority	Florida Robes	NUP	San Jose del Monte	Lone
Members for the Majority	Lorna Silverio	NUP	Bulacan	3rd
Members for the Majority	Fernando Cabredo	PDP–Laban	Albay	3rd
Members for the Majority	Braeden John Biron	Nacionalista	Iloilo	4th
Members for the Majority	Eduardo Gullas	Nacionalista	Cebu	1st
Members for the Majority	Ron Salo	KABAYAN	Party-list	
Members for the Majority	Macnell Lusotan	MARINO	Party-list	
Members for the Majority	Domingo Rivera	CIBAC	Party-list	
Members for the Majority	Enrico Pineda	1PACMAN	Party-list	
Members for the Minority	Isagani Amatong	Liberal	Zamboanga del Norte	3rd
Members for the Minority	Ma. Victoria A. Umali	A TEACHER	Party-list	

==== Chairperson ====
- Francisco Datol Jr. (Note: Died on August 10, 2020.) (SENIOR CITIZENS)

==== Member for the Majority ====
- Nestor Fongwan (Note: Died on December 18, 2019.) (Benguet–Lone, PDP–Laban)

== See also ==
- House of Representatives of the Philippines
- List of Philippine House of Representatives committees
