= Governor of Benguet =

Local chief executive

- Gobernador ng Benguet (Filipino)
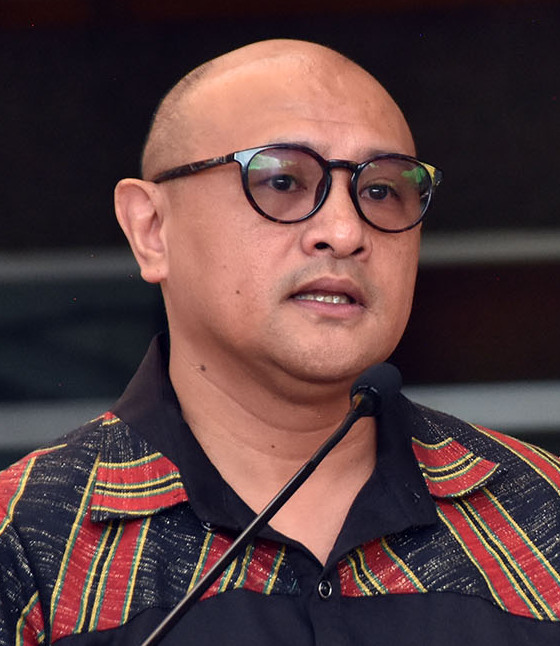
- Incumbent; Melchor Diclas since June 30, 2019
- Style: Honorable (formal); Mr./Madame Governor (informal)
- Seat: Benguet Provincial Hall
- Term length: 3 years
- Inaugural holder: H. P. Whitmarsh (sub-provincial era); Ben Palispis (provincial era)
- Formation: November 23, 1900 (as sub-province); June 18, 1966 (as province)
- Website: Official Website of the Province of Benguet

The governor of Benguet is the local chief executive of the Philippine province of Benguet.

== List ==
=== Benguet sub-province ===
The former sub-province of Benguet was part of the old Mountain Province (La Montañosa).

No.	Term	Name	Image	Remarks
1	1901–1908	H.P. Whitmarsh		First civil governor of Benguet
2	1908–1912	William F. Pack		
3	1913–1918	Juan "Oraa" Cariño		First Filipino governor of Benguet
4	1918–1922	Juan Gaerlan		Deputy governor
5	1923–1932	Tomas Blanco		Deputy governor
6	1940–1945	Henry Kamora		Military governor (Japanese occupation)
7	1946–1949	Dennis M. Molintas		Appointed Governor of the Old Mountain Province comprising the sub-provinces of Benguet, Mountain Province, Ifugao, Abra and Kalinga-Apayao, and the City of Baguio by Head of State Manuel L. Quezon—In the constitution of the Republic of the Philippines on July 4, 1946, enacted by the Tydings-McDuffie law, also called Philippine Independence Act under U.S. federal law. Then in a later time of his political career, in 1966 steps down as elected Vice Governor of the Old Mountain Province to be the transitional Governor by way of succession for the creation of the province of Benguet, in accordance with Republic Act No. 4695 enacted on June 18, 1966. Beforehand, Benguet was a former subordinate province under the jurisdiction and authority of the Governor of then undivided Old Mountain Province, in a larger territory and broader scale of influence.
8	1950–1951	Jose Mencio		
9	1951–1952	Louis Hora		Deputy governor
10	1951–1952	Antero Alumit		Deputy governor
11	1952–1954	Dalmacio Lubos		
12	1954–1963	Bado Dangwa		Two-terms

=== Benguet province ===
On June 18, 1966, Mountain Province was divided into four provinces, creating the provinces of Benguet, Mountain Province, Ifugao, and Kalinga-Apayao.

No.	Term	Name	Image	Remarks
13	1968–1986	Ben Palispis		
*	1986–1988	Bantas Suanding		Officer in Charge; Appointed as Interim Governor during the transition period of the Aquino Government.
14	1988–1992	Andres Bugnosen		
15	1992–1995	Jaime Paul B. Panganiban		
16	1995–2004	Raul M. Molintas		
17	2004–2007	Borromeo P. Melchor		
18	2007–2016	Nestor Fongwan		
19	2016–2019	Crescencio C. Pacalso		
20	2019–present	Melchor D. Diclas		
