= Atok, Benguet =

Municipality in Benguet, Philippines

Atok
- Municipality
- Municipality of Atok
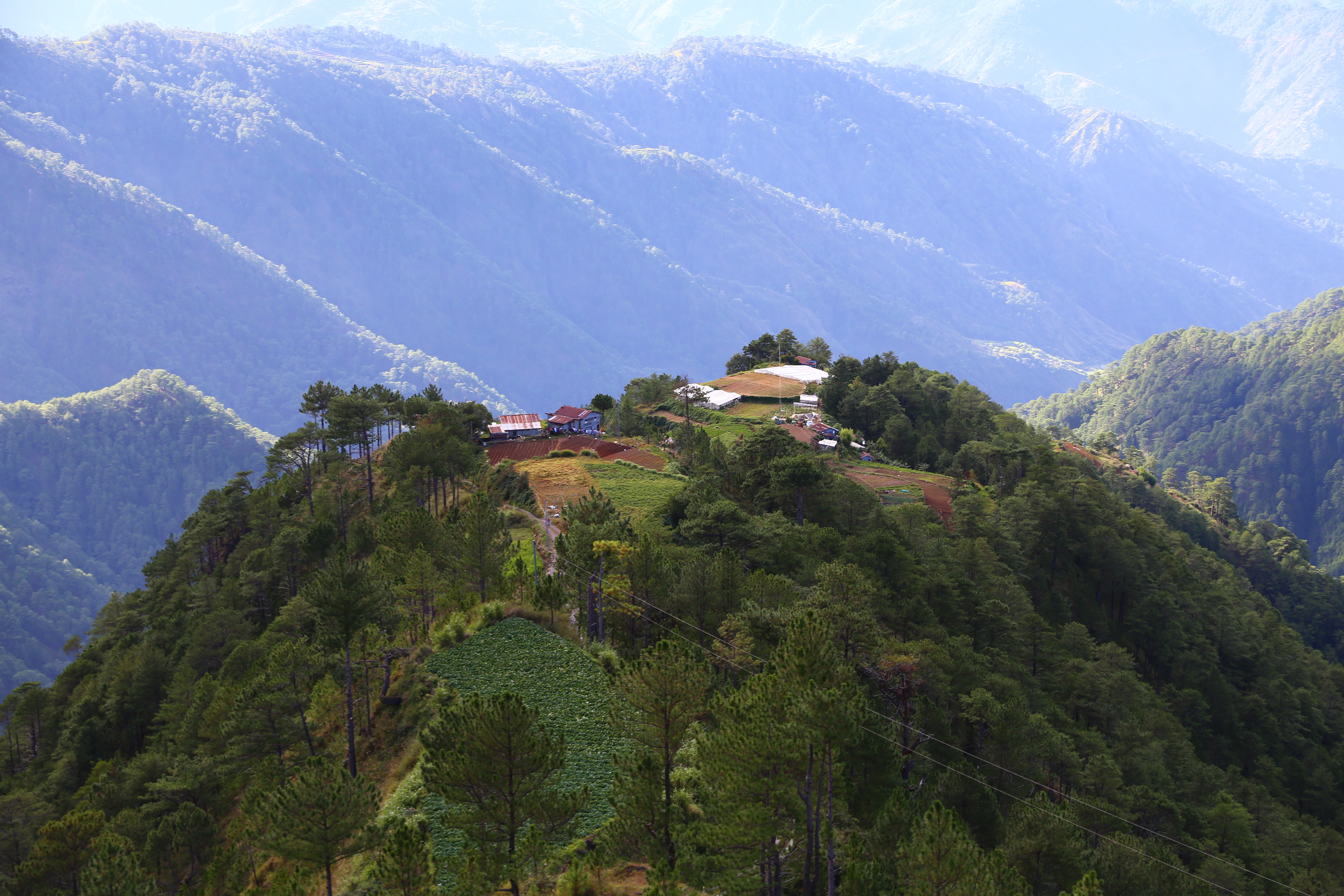

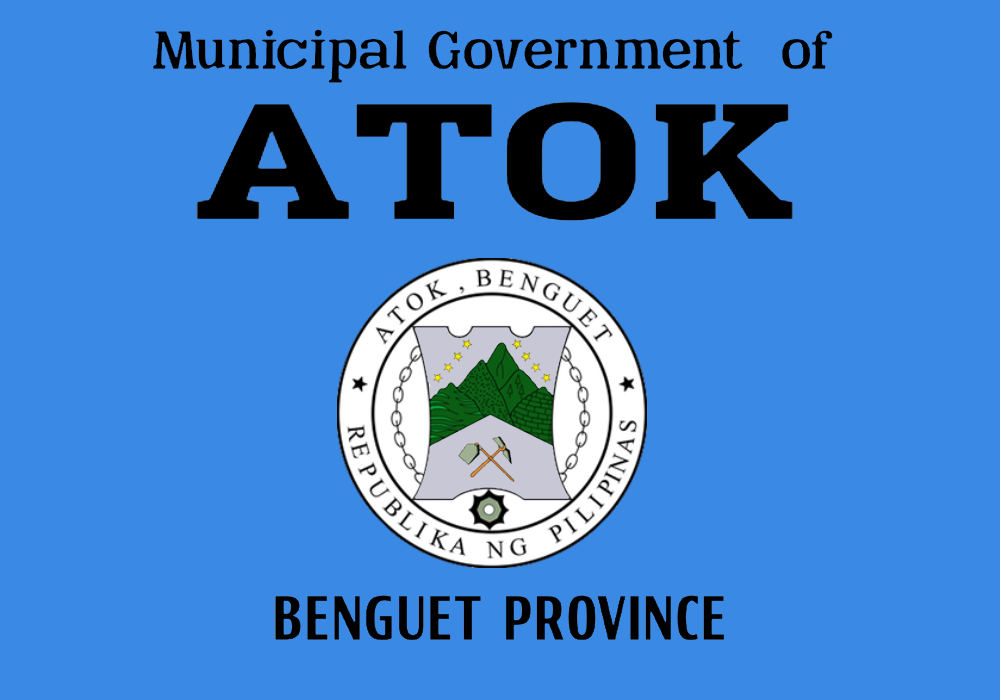
- Flag Seal

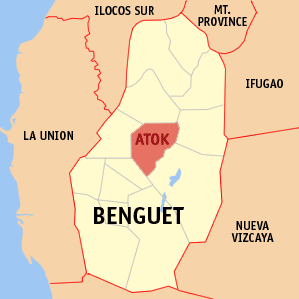
- Map of Benguet with Atok highlighted
- Interactive map of Atok
- Location within the Philippines
- Coordinates: 16°37′38″N 120°46′02″E
- Country: Philippines
- Region: Cordillera Administrative Region
- Province: Benguet
- District: Lone district
- Founded: 1900
- Barangays: 8 (see Barangays)

Government
  - Type: Sangguniang Bayan
  - Mayor: Franklin L. Smith
  - Vice Mayor: Edward S. Beliano
  - Representative: Eric G. Yap
  - Municipal Council: Members: Marilou A. Zarate; Raymundo S. Sarac; Edward S. Haight; Samuel C. Fianza; Charlie S. Lingbanan; Kelly Denn V. Tomas; Simon T. Backian; Paul D. Mayos
  - Electorate: 11,688 voters (2025)

Area
  - Total: 214.99 km^{2} (83.01 sq mi)
- Elevation: 1,780 m (5,840 ft)
- Highest elevation: 2,717 m (8,914 ft)
- Lowest elevation: 1,004 m (3,294 ft)

Population (2024 census)
  - Total: 19,346
  - Density: 89.986/km^{2} (233.06/sq mi)
  - Households: 4,736

Economy
  - Income class: 3rd municipal income class
  - Poverty incidence: 10.9% (2023)
  - Revenue: ₱ 159 million (2024)
  - Assets: ₱ 507.5 million (2024)
  - Expenditure: ₱ 136.1 million (2024)
  - Liabilities: ₱ 57.16 million (2024)

Service provider
  - Electricity: Benguet Electric Cooperative (BENECO)
- Time zone: UTC+8 (PST)
- ZIP code: 2612
- PSGC: 1401101000
- IDD : area code: +63 (0)74
- Native languages: Kankanaey; Ibaloi; Ilocano; Tagalog
- Website: www.atok.gov.ph

Atok ([ˈʔatɔk]), officially the Municipality of Atok (Ilocano: Ili ti Atok; Tagalog: Bayan ng Atok), is a 3rd-class municipality in the province of Benguet, Philippines. According to the 2024 census, it has a population of 19,346 people.

== History ==
=== Spanish period ===
The area of Atok was previously referred to by the natives and Spanish colonizers as Chontog, an Ibaloi word for "mountainous". Spanish military officials and missionaries arrived at Chontog in 1892, establishing precedencias (tax collection stations) in the area and its surrounding settlements.

The Ibaloi phrase Nay patok shi Chontog, which means "on the mountain top", was later shortened to Atok.

=== American period ===
During the American rule, Atok was established as one of the 19 townships of the province of Benguet, upon the issuance of Act No. 48 by the Philippine Commission on November 22, 1900.

On August 13, 1908, Benguet was established as a sub-province of the newly created Mountain Province with the enactment of Act No. 1876. As a result, six townships of Benguet were abolished, but Atok remained a constituent town of Benguet sub-province.

=== World War II ===
During the Second World War, Atok was the scene of fierce pitch battles between the military forces and guerrilla fighters of the 66th Infantry Regiment, Philippine Commonwealth Army, USAFIP-NL and the Japanese Imperial Army forces. The steep terrain along the Halsema road suited Filipino troops, the Philippine Commonwealth military, and guerrillas to mount ambushes against the Japanese forces. One of these battles took place in what is now “Guerrilla Saddle” located at km. 26, in barangay Caliking.

=== Post-war era ===
On June 25, 1963, President Diosdado Macapagal issued Executive Order No. 42 converting eight (8) of the thirteen (13) towns (designated as municipal districts) of Benguet into regular municipalities. Atok was among them.

On June 18, 1966, the sub-province of Benguet was separated from the old Mountain Province and was converted into a regular province. Atok remained to be a component municipality of the newly established province.

== Geography ==
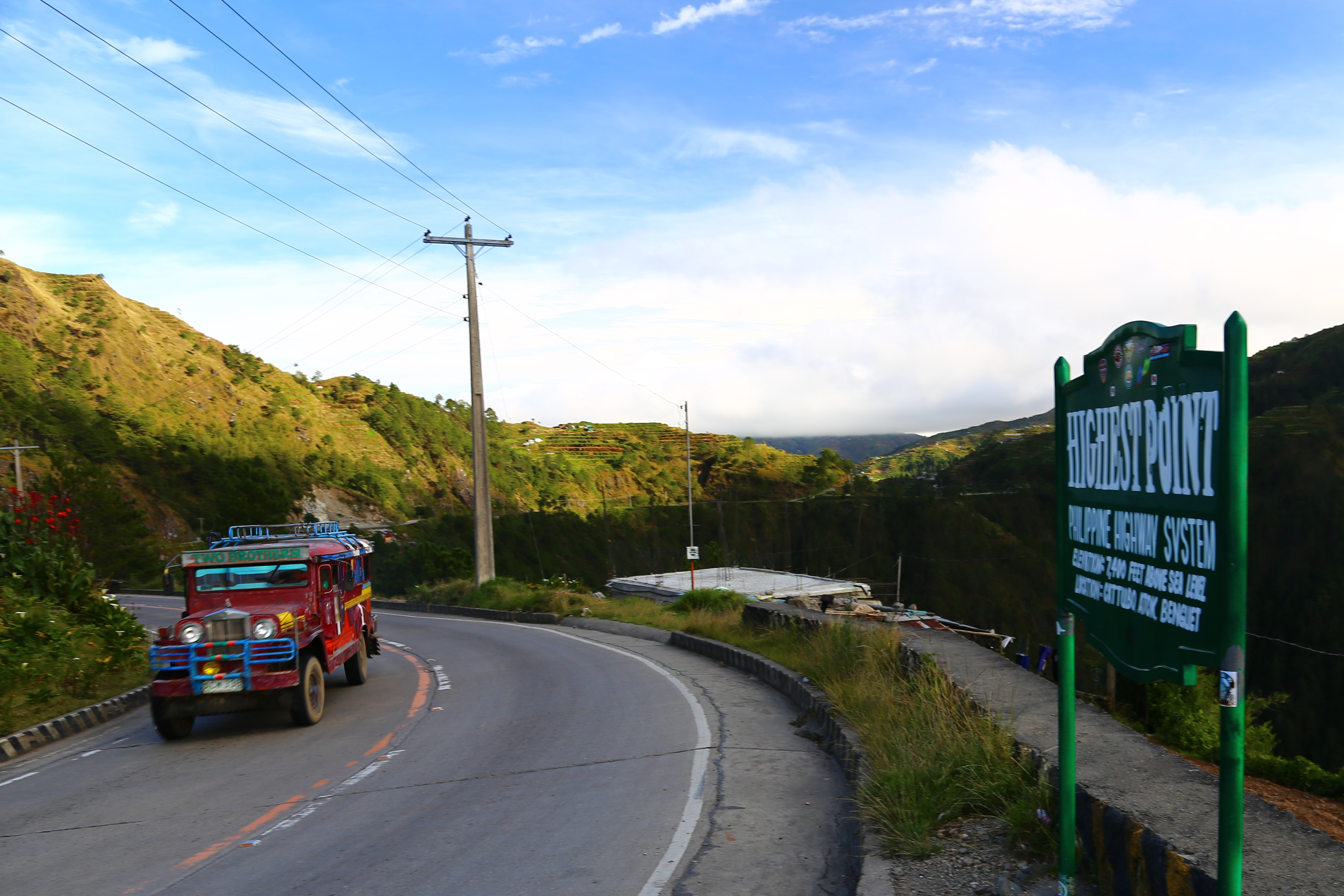
Highest point in the Philippine Highway System marker along Halsema Highway

Atok is located at 16°37′38″N 120°46′02″E, situated at the central portion of Benguet. It is bounded by Kibungan on the north, Kabayan on the north-east, Bokod on the southeast, Tublay on the south-west, and Kapangan on the west.

According to the Philippine Statistics Authority, the municipality has a land area of 214.99 square kilometres (83.01 sq mi) constituting 7.76% of the 2,769.08-square-kilometre- (1,069.15 sq mi) total area of Benguet.

The land is characterized as mountainous with many steep cliffs. It is home to Mt. Timbak, the third highest mountain in Luzon. The second highest point in the Philippine Highway System is also located at Barangay Paoay along Halsema Highway, at 2,255 metres (7,400 ft) above sea level. It held formerly the title as the highest point in the Philippine Highway System since World War II until early 2019. This is after the validation and assessment conducted by the Department of Public Works and Highways - Cordillera Administrative Region (DPWH-CAR) Regional Office last January 2019 declaring a new highest point at 2,428.66 meters (7968.045 feet) along the Kiangan-Tinoc-Buguias Road in Tinoc Town some 55 Kilometers east via Atok, Benguet.

Atok is situated 42.57 kilometres (26.45 mi) from the provincial capital La Trinidad, and 295.50 kilometres (183.62 mi) from the country's capital city of Manila.

=== Climate ===
Climate data for Atok, Benguet
Month	Jan	Feb	Mar	Apr	May	Jun	Jul	Aug	Sep	Oct	Nov	Dec	Year
Mean daily maximum °C (°F)	11 (52)	13 (55)	16 (61)	19 (66)	19 (66)	18 (64)	18 (64)	17 (63)	16 (61)	15 (59)	13 (55)	12 (54)	16 (60)
Mean daily minimum °C (°F)	4 (39)	6 (43)	8 (46)	11 (52)	13 (55)	13 (55)	12 (54)	12 (54)	12 (54)	11 (52)	9 (48)	7 (45)	10 (50)
Average precipitation mm (inches)	42 (1.7)	48 (1.9)	74 (2.9)	110 (4.3)	269 (10.6)	275 (10.8)	362 (14.3)	325 (12.8)	330 (13.0)	306 (12.0)	126 (5.0)	61 (2.4)	2,328 (91.7)
Average rainy days	11.2	12.0	17.1	21.2	27.1	26.8	28.1	27.0	26.0	24.5	17.7	12.4	251.1
Source: Meteoblue

Like most part of Benguet it has subtropical highland climate, during the cold months of the year, the municipality experiences very low temperatures reaching 9 degrees Celsius (48 degrees Fahrenheit). This causes common frost to settle on the ground, causing millions of damage to crops, but drawing tourists to the town.

=== Barangays ===
Atok is politically subdivided into 8 barangays. Each barangay consists of puroks and some have sitios.

PSGC	Barangay	Population			±% p.a.	
		2024		2010		
141101001	Abiang	8.5%	1,643	1,766	▾	−0.50%
141101002	Caliking	17.4%	3,368	3,155	▴	0.45%
141101003	Cattubo	13.8%	2,674	2,674	Steady	0.00%
141101004	Naguey	8.7%	1,678	1,723	▾	−0.18%
141101005	Paoay	22.1%	4,285	4,181	▴	0.17%
141101006	Pasdong	6.7%	1,304	1,078	▴	1.32%
141101007	Poblacion	9.9%	1,914	2,045	▾	−0.46%
141101008	Topdac	12.2%	2,352	2,620	▾	−0.74%
	Total		19,346	19,218	▴	0.05%

== Demographics ==
Population census of Atok
Year	Pop.	±% p.a.
1903	5	—
1918	3,605	+55.07%
1939	6,047	+2.49%
1948	5,913	−0.25%
1960	8,353	+2.92%
1970	10,215	+2.03%
1975	11,589	+2.56%
1980	14,466	+4.53%
1990	13,853	−0.43%
1995	14,862	+1.33%
2000	16,657	+2.47%
2007	19,253	+2.02%
2010	19,242	−0.02%
2015	19,668	+0.42%
2020	19,218	−0.49%
2024	19,346	+0.16%
Source: Philippine Statistics Authority

In the 2024 census, Atok had a population of 19,346 people. The population density was 90 inhabitants per square kilometre (230/sq mi).

== Economy ==
Poverty incidence of Atok (%)

Source: Philippine Statistics Authority

Tourism serves as the key economic drivers in Atok. The famous tourist spots such as the Northern Blossom Flower Farm and Sakura Park boost the agri-tourism industry of Atok.

Atok is widely known for its vegetables and carnations. Local harvests are now sold directly on-site to visiting tourists at favorable prices.

== Government ==
=== Local government ===
Atok, belonging to the lone congressional district of the province of Benguet, is governed by a mayor designated as its local chief executive and by a municipal council as its legislative body in accordance with the Local Government Code. The mayor, vice mayor, and the councilors are elected directly by the people through an election which is being held every three years.

=== Elected officials ===
Members of the Municipal Council (2025-2028)
Position	Name
Congressman	Eric G. Yap
Mayor	Franklin L. Smith
Vice-Mayor	Edward S. Beliano
Councilors	Marilou A. Zarate
Councilors	Raymundo S. Sarac
Councilors	Edward S. Haight
Councilors	Samuel C. Fianza
Councilors	Charlie S. Lingbanan
Councilors	Kelly Denn V. Tomas
Councilors	Simon T. Backian
Councilors	Paul D. Mayos

== Education ==
The Atok Schools District Office governs all educational institutions within the municipality. It oversees the management and operations of all private and public, from primary to secondary schools.

=== Public schools ===
As of 2014, Atok has 22 public elementary schools and 2 public secondary schools.

Elementary (2013-2014)
School	Barangay
Adoyunan Elementary School	Abiang
Beckes Pol-oc Primary School	Paoay
Bilis Primary School	Caliking
Boneng Elementary School	Naguey
Bonglo Elementary School	Paoay
Bosleng Elementary School	Paoay
Busoc Primary School	Poblacion
Cagui-ing Elementary School	Caliking
Calasipan Elementary School	Cattubo
Caliking Community School	Caliking
Camp 30 Elementary School	Caliking
Celo Haights Elementary School	Paoay
Dalmacio Miguel Primary School	Abiang
Englandad Primary School	Paoay
Filomena P. Cating Elementary School	Poblacion
Ja'pa Primary School	Topdac
Mauro Laruan Elementary School	Poblacion
Naguey Elementary School	Naguey
Oyusan Primary School	Cattubo
Pasdong Elementary School	Pasdong
Rufino Alawas Elementary School	Cattubo
Topdac Elementary School	Topdac

Secondary (2013-2014)
School	Barangay
Atok National High School	Poblacion
Atok National High School - Caliking Annex	Caliking

== Gallery ==
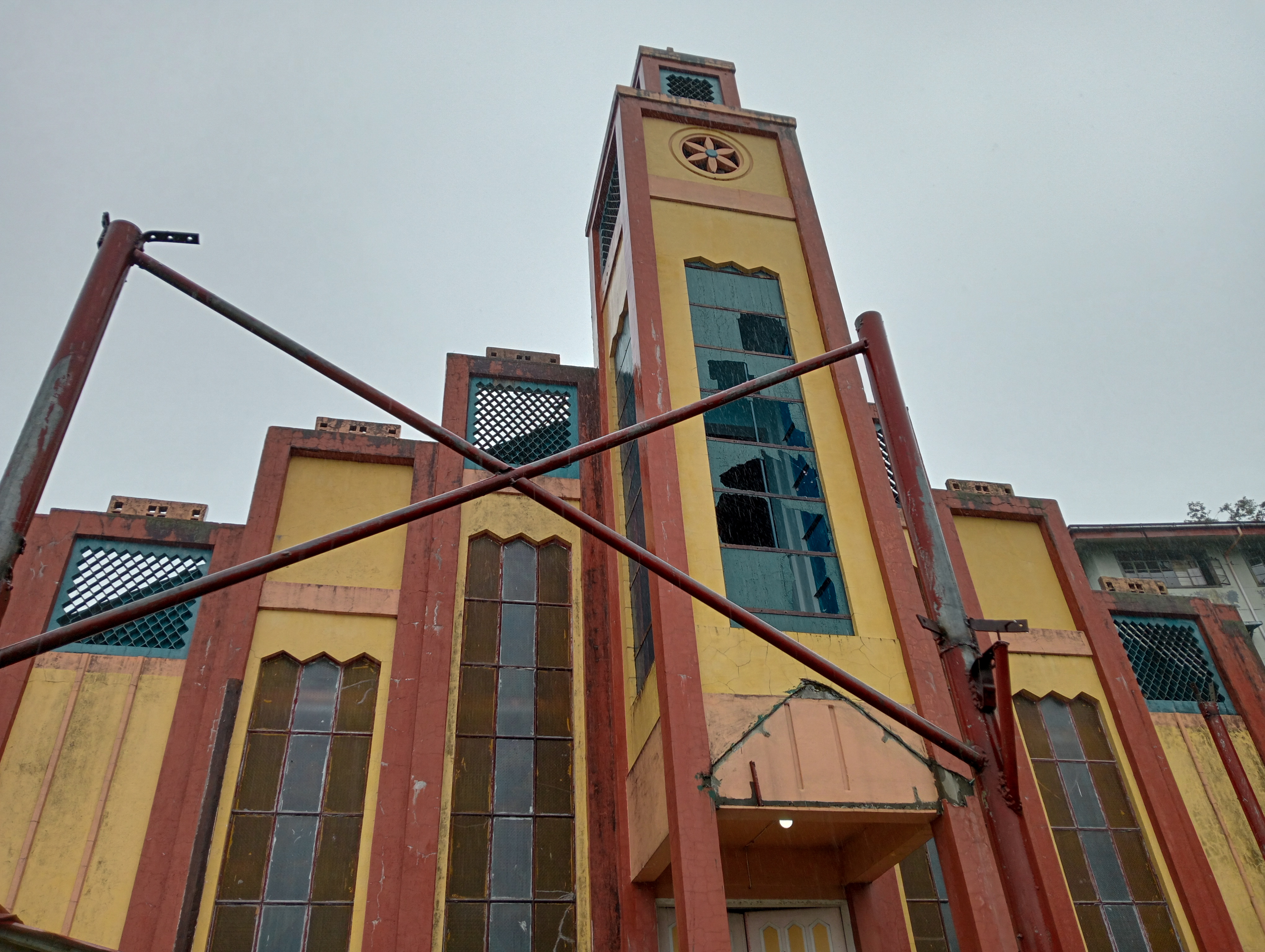
Sayangan Church

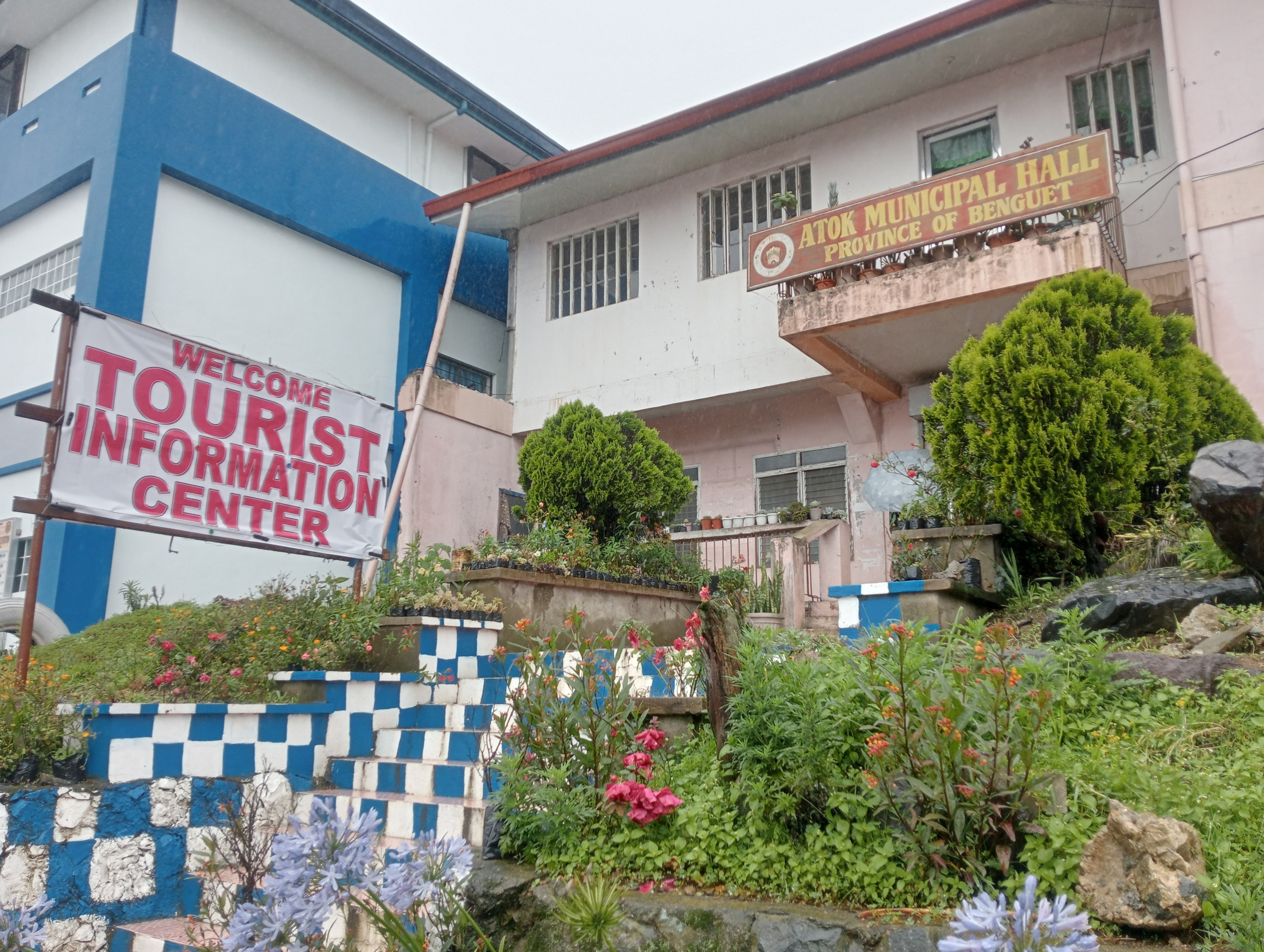
Old Atok Municipal Hall

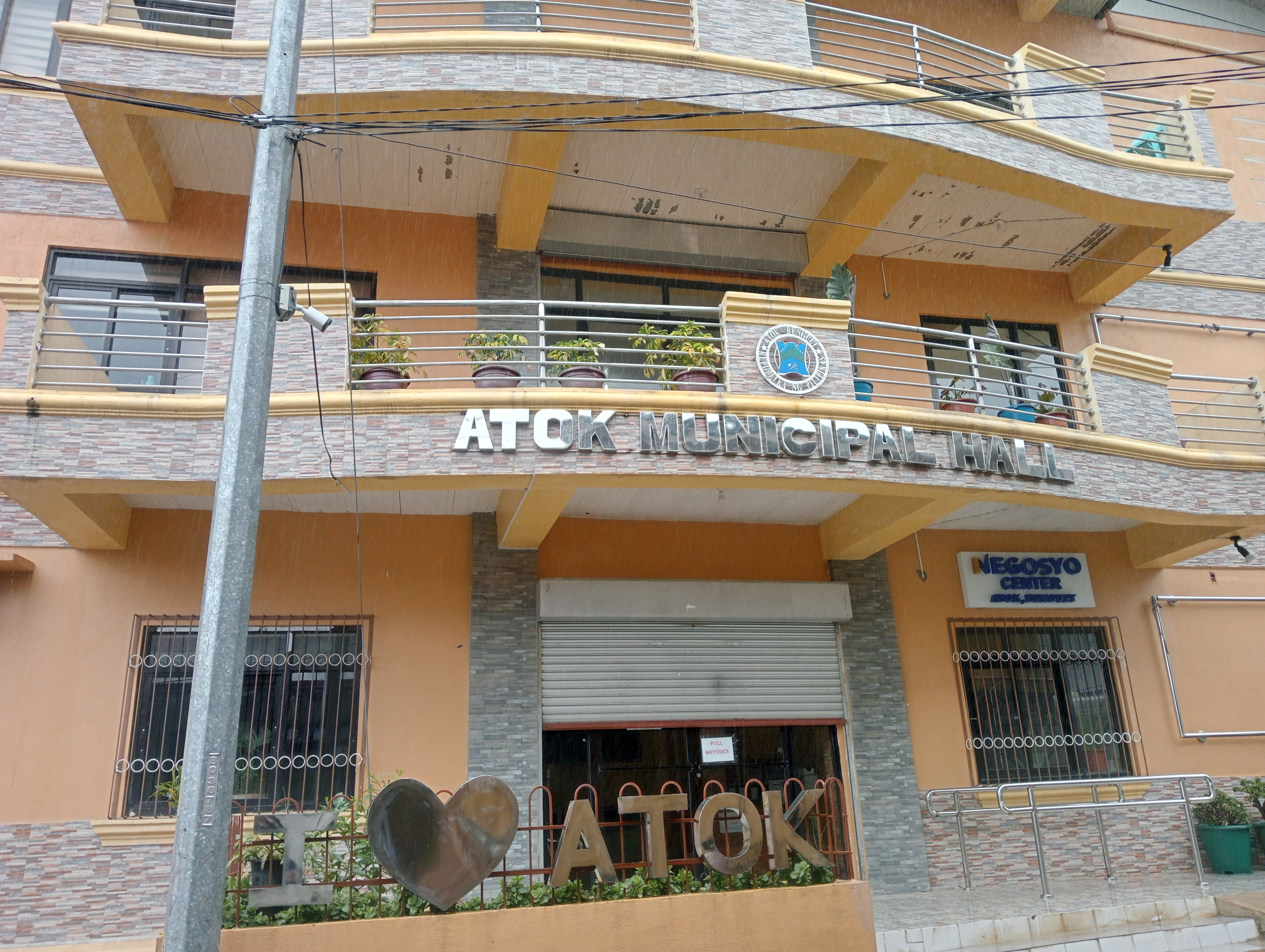
New Atok Municipal Hall

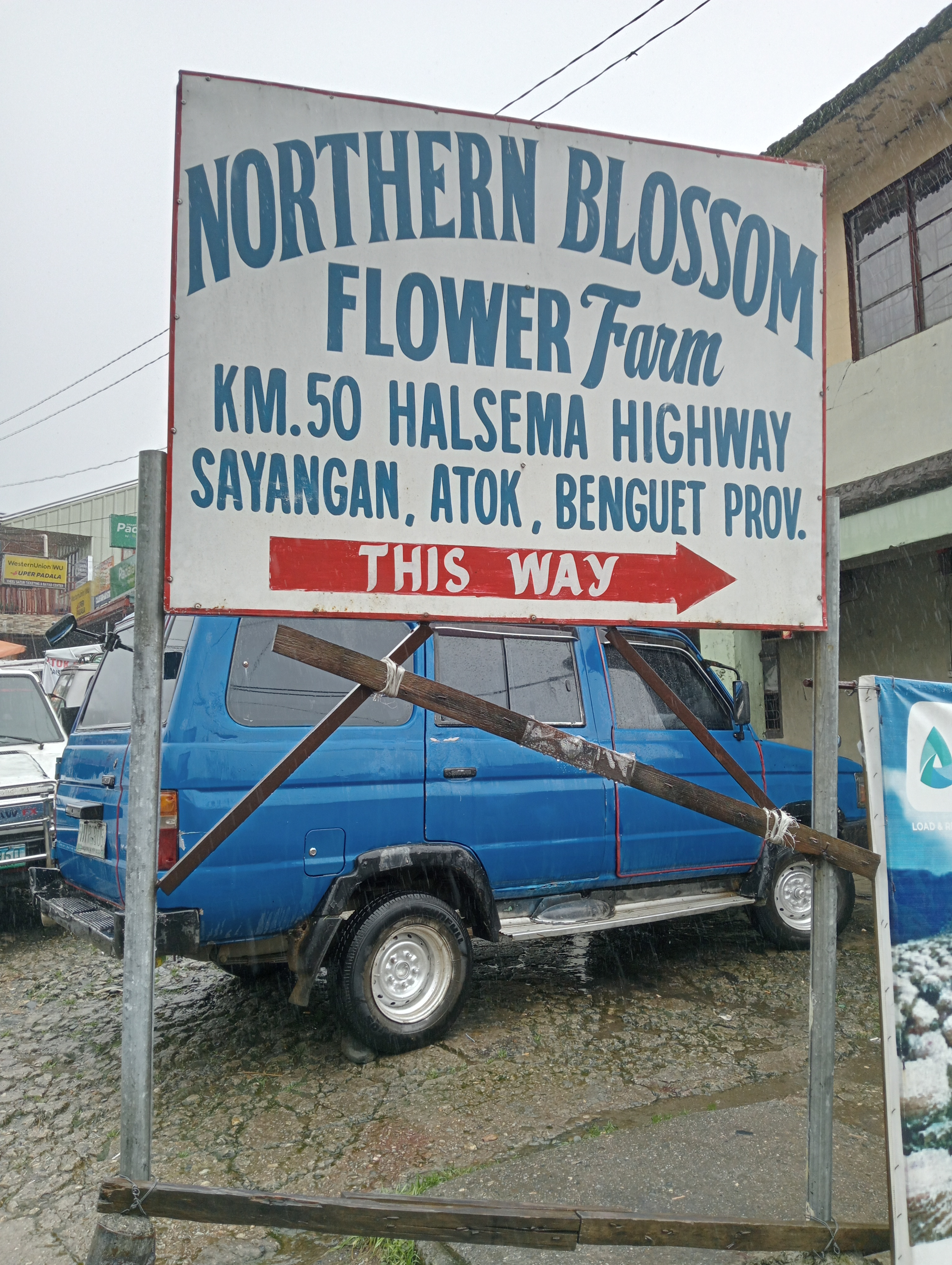
Northern Blossom Flower Farm

== See also ==
- Benguet–Kōchi Sisterhood Park
