= Kibungan =

Municipality in Benguet, Philippines

- Municipality
- Municipality of Kibungan
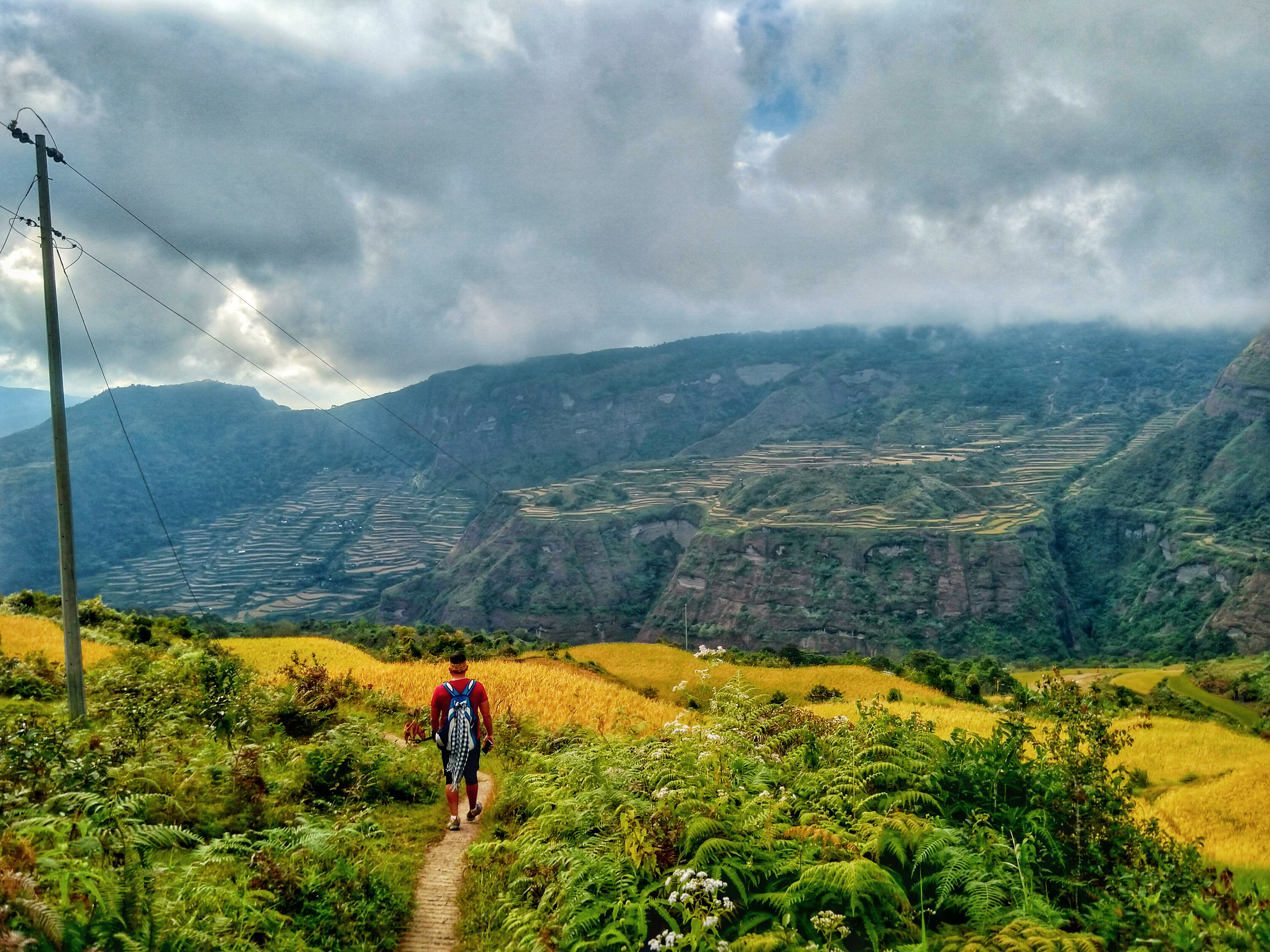
- Mountains of Kibungan

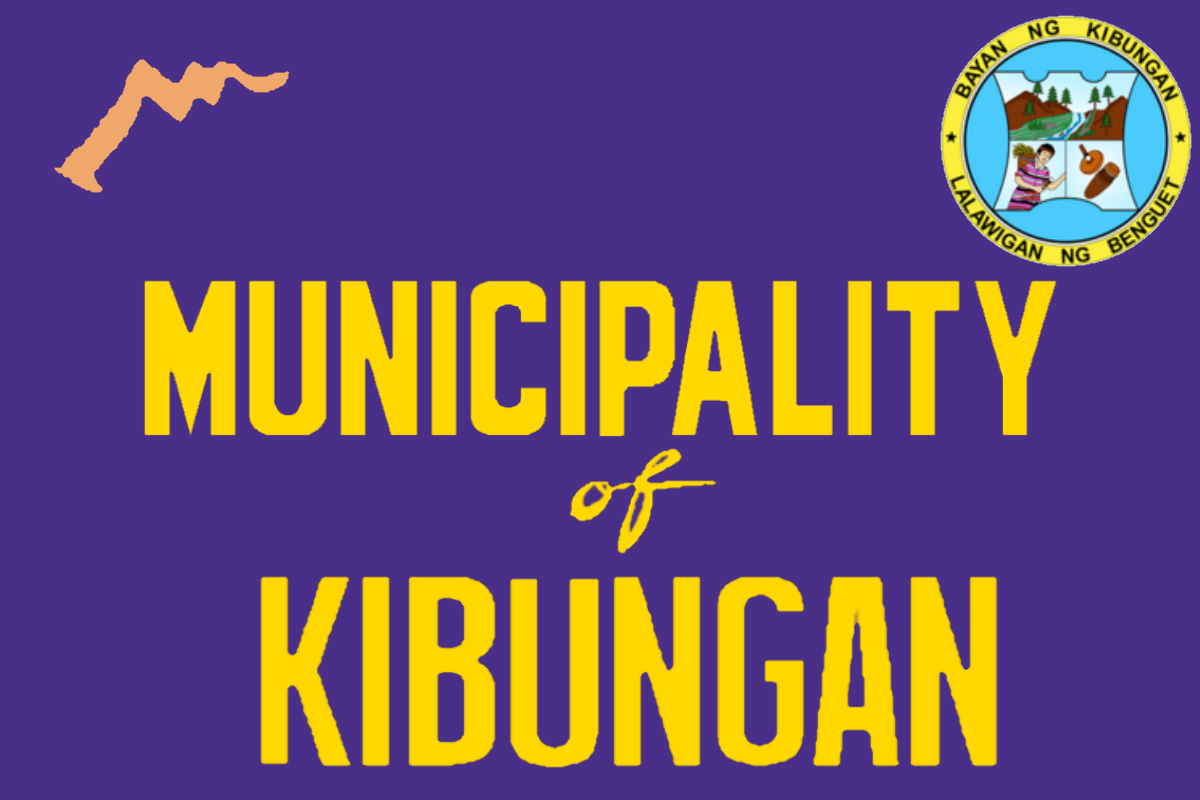
- Flag Seal

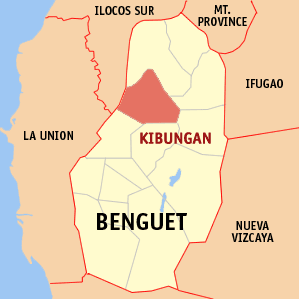
- Map of Benguet with Kibungan highlighted
- Interactive map of Kibungan
- Location within the Philippines
- Coordinates: 16°41′38″N 120°39′14″E
- Country: Philippines
- Region: Cordillera Administrative Region
- Province: Benguet
- District: Lone district of Benguet
- Barangays: 7 (see Barangays)

Government
  - Type: Sangguniang Bayan
  - Mayor: Agustin J. Tello
  - Vice Mayor: Laurence D. Toking
  - Representative: Eric Go Yap
  - Municipal Council: Members: Roger D. Tugade; Lovio T. Nabe; Brenson S. Siadto; Pauline L. Gumpic; Marcial B. Lingaling; Narciso L. Cayad-an; Ronico S. Agayo; Jovel B. Bentres
  - Electorate: 10,731 voters (2025)

Area
  - Total: 254.86 km^{2} (98.40 sq mi)
- Elevation: 1,273 m (4,177 ft)
- Highest elevation: 2,001 m (6,565 ft)
- Lowest elevation: 596 m (1,955 ft)

Population (2024 census)
  - Total: 16,884
  - Density: 66.248/km^{2} (171.58/sq mi)
  - Households: 4,127

Economy
  - Income class: 3rd municipal income class
  - Poverty incidence: 14.31% (2023)
  - Revenue: ₱ 157.6 million (2024)
  - Assets: ₱ 335.4 million (2024)
  - Expenditure: ₱ 148.3 million (2024)
  - Liabilities: ₱ 32.89 million (2024)

Service provider
  - Electricity: Benguet Electric Cooperative (BENECO)
- Time zone: UTC+8 (PST)
- ZIP code: 2611
- PSGC: 1401109000
- IDD : area code: +63 (0)74
- Native languages: Kankanaey; Ibaloi; Ilocano; Tagalog

Kibungan, officially the Municipality of Kibungan (Ilocano: Ili ti Kibungan; Tagalog: Bayan ng Kibungan), is a municipality in the province of Benguet, Philippines. According to the 2024 census, it has a population of 16,884 people.

== Geography ==
Kibungan is at the northwestern section of Benguet. It is bounded by Bakun on the north, Buguias on the mid-east, Kabayan on the southeast, Atok and Kapangan on the south, and Sugpon on the mid-west.

According to the Philippine Statistics Authority, the municipality has a land area of 254.86 square kilometres (98.40 sq mi) constituting 9.20% of the 2,769.08-square-kilometre- (1,069.15 sq mi) total area of Benguet.

Kibungan has seven barangays namely; Sagpat, Poblacion, Palina, Tacadang, Madaymen, Badeo, and Lubo. Barangay Sagpat and Lubo produces sayote as their main crop, sayote was tagged the "hanging gold". Barangay Madaymen and Palina also produces varieties of vegetables like cabbage, potatoes, carrots, and more. Barangay Tacadang and Badeo is not accessible by vehicle because of the rocky mountains and its hard to construct road.

Kibungan is known in the province of Benguet as the town with unique mountains often mistaken to resemble those of Switzerland. Deep ravines and cliffs separate and isolate many sitios and some barangays. Although some plateaus, hills and small valleys can be seen in the locality, Kibungan is dominantly mountainous.

The municipality is within a cool highland mountainous zone with elevations at more than 2,500 metres (8,200 ft) above sea level. During its coolest months of December to January, Barangay Madaymen experiences chilling temperature of 0 °C (32 °F), causing the famous Frost of Madaymen.

Kibungan is situated 55.71 kilometres (34.62 mi) from the provincial capital La Trinidad, and 308.65 kilometres (191.79 mi) from the country's capital city of Manila.

=== Barangays ===
Kibungan is politically subdivided into 7 barangays. Each barangay consists of puroks and some have sitios.

PSGC	Barangay	Population			±% p.a.	
		2024		2010		
141109001	Badeo	5.1%	867	840	▴	0.22%
141109002	Lubo	8.3%	1,399	1,235	▴	0.86%
141109003	Madaymen	32.9%	5,549	5,875	▾	−0.39%
141109004	Palina	8.5%	1,442	1,387	▴	0.27%
141109005	Poblacion	14.4%	2,427	2,532	▾	−0.29%
141109006	Sagpat	22.0%	3,711	3,101	▴	1.25%
141109007	Tacadang	9.8%	1,656	1,880	▾	−0.87%
	Total		16,884	17,051	▾	−0.07%

=== Climate ===
Climate data for Kibungan, Benguet
Month	Jan	Feb	Mar	Apr	May	Jun	Jul	Aug	Sep	Oct	Nov	Dec	Year
Mean daily maximum °C (°F)	22 (72)	23 (73)	24 (75)	25 (77)	24 (75)	23 (73)	22 (72)	22 (72)	22 (72)	23 (73)	23 (73)	23 (73)	23 (73)
Mean daily minimum °C (°F)	13 (55)	14 (57)	15 (59)	17 (63)	18 (64)	18 (64)	17 (63)	17 (63)	17 (63)	16 (61)	15 (59)	14 (57)	16 (61)
Average precipitation mm (inches)	42 (1.7)	48 (1.9)	74 (2.9)	110 (4.3)	269 (10.6)	275 (10.8)	362 (14.3)	325 (12.8)	330 (13.0)	306 (12.0)	126 (5.0)	61 (2.4)	2,328 (91.7)
Average rainy days	11.2	12.0	17.1	21.2	27.1	26.8	28.1	27.0	26.0	24.5	17.7	12.4	251.1
Source: Meteoblue

== Demographics ==
Population census of Kibungan
Year	Pop.	±% p.a.
1918	2,589	—
1939	3,426	+1.34%
1948	4,682	+3.53%
1960	6,901	+3.29%
1970	9,115	+2.82%
1975	9,198	+0.18%
1980	10,500	+2.68%
1990	12,753	+1.96%
1995	14,148	+1.96%
2000	15,036	+1.31%
2007	15,700	+0.60%
2010	16,850	+2.61%
2015	17,292	+0.49%
2020	17,051	−0.29%
2024	16,884	−0.24%
Source: Philippine Statistics Authority

In the 2024 census, Kibungan had a population of 16,884 people. The population density was 66 inhabitants per square kilometre (170/sq mi).

== Economy ==
Poverty incidence of Kibungan (%)

Source: Philippine Statistics Authority

The key economic sectors of Kibungan are agriculture, mining, and handicrafts. The main crops of Kibungan are rice, sweet potatoes, strawberries, and vegetables. Traditional and localized mineral extraction contributes to household incomes within Kibungan. Kibungan produces handicrafts through traditional weaving and basketry.

== Government ==
Kibungan, belonging to the lone congressional district of the province of Benguet, is governed by a mayor designated as its local chief executive and by a municipal council as its legislative body in accordance with the Local Government Code. The mayor, vice mayor, and the councilors are elected directly by the people through an election which is being held every three years.

=== Elected officials ===
Members of the Municipal Council (2025-2028)
Position	Name
Congressman	Eric Yap
Mayor	Agustin J. Tello
Vice-Mayor	Laurence D. Toking
Councilors	Roger D. Tugade
Councilors	Lovio T. Nabe
Councilors	Brenson S. Siadto
Councilors	Pauline L. Gumpic
Councilors	Marcial B. Lingaling
Councilors	Narciso L. Cayad-an
Councilors	Ronico S. Agayo
Councilors	Jovel B. Bentres

== Tourism ==
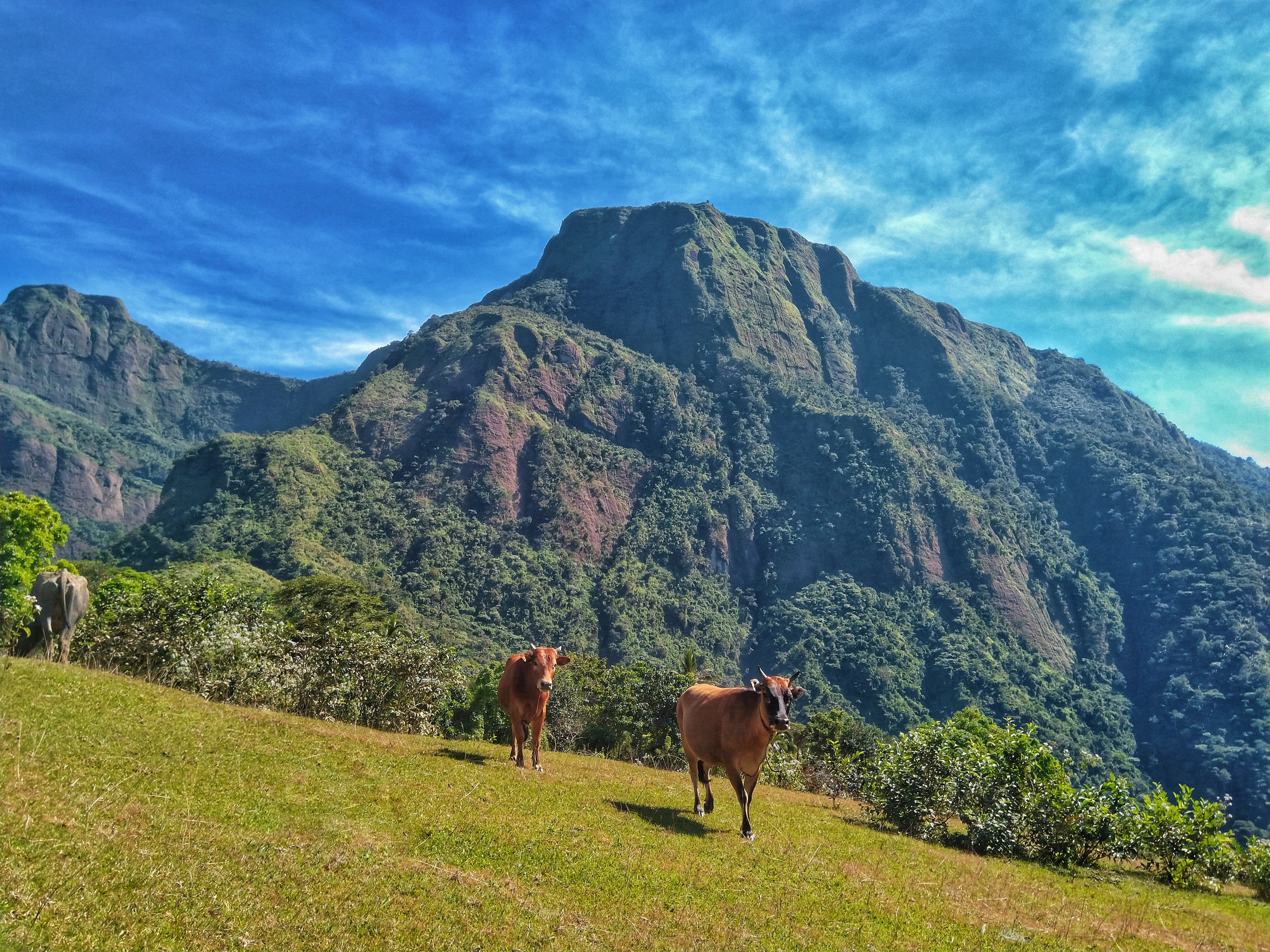
Cattles with a view of the Cordillera Mountain Range

- Les-eng Rice Terraces: These terraces can be reached after 6-hour hike through lush pine forests in Barangay Tacadang.
- Aiano Rey Mayos River: located at the north-eastern part of Barangay Poblacion. It is approximately 2.5 kilometres (1.6 mi) in length and is about 3 kilometres (1.9 mi) away from Poblacion Proper. The river originates from ridges of nearby Barangays Madaymen, Palina and Tacadang; and supplies water to rice paddies and vegetable farms along the vicinity.
- Palina Rice Terraces: In Barangay Palina at the foot of Mount Kilkili, believed to be a former volcano because of its conical shape. It was constructed following a century-old system of rice terraces built with stone walls and neatly arranged one after the other. The rice terraces are at their best in December and June when the rice paddies turn golden yellow, near harvest time. The Palina rice terraces is known as the municipality's rice granary.
- Lubo Lake: It was an open pit abandoned by the BONENG MINES operated by the WMC due to bankruptcy. The pit was filled with water in the early 2001 due to rains and typhoons and accumulated due to the absence of an outlet.
- Tacadang Hiking Circuit

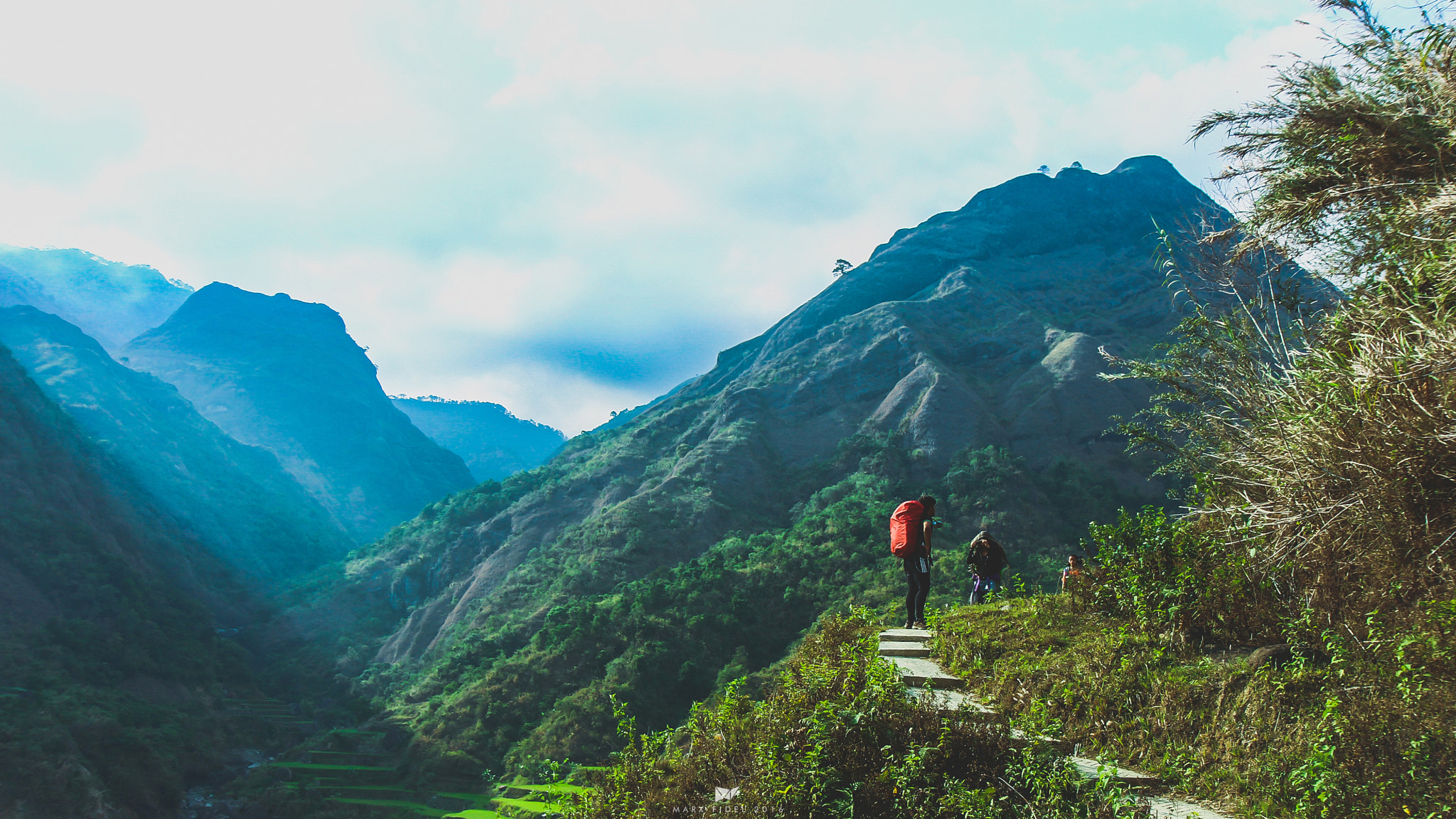
Scenery at Kibugan

In order to promote the uniqueness of the municipality's ecotourism, the people want the tag "Switzerland of Benguet" removed as of 2007. The tag was created in good faith as the municipality is a mountainous region and has a cool climate that is associated with Switzerland. However, this gives the wrong impression that the municipality has snow-covered peaks for skiing.

== Education ==
The Kibungan Schools District Office governs all educational institutions within the municipality. It oversees the management and operations of all private and public, from primary to secondary schools.

=== Public schools ===
As of 2014, Kibungan has 24 public elementary schools and 3 public secondary schools.

Elementary (2013-2014)
School	Barangay
Badeo Barrio School	Badeo
Batangan Elementary School	Tacadang
Bekes Elementary School	Tacadang
Camilo Lucaben Elementary School	Madaymen
Enrique Jose Elementary School	Madaymen
Es-Esa Soblino Alodos Elementary School	Tacadang
Ewa-Bokes Elementary School	(Padang)
Gasal Barrio School	Lubo
Kibungan Central School	Poblacion
Lanipew Barrio School	Tacadang
Legleg Barrio School	Palina
Les-eng Primary School	Tacadang
Lubo Elementary School	Lubo
Mocgao Elementary School	Badeo
Napsong Barrio School	Madaymen
Pakpakitan Elementary School	Madaymen
Palina Elementary School	Palina
Polis Barrio School	Poblacion
Saddle Elementary School	Sagpat
Sagpat Elementary School	Sagpat
Sapdaan Primary School	Sagpat
Tabbac Barrio School	Palina
Tableo Barrio School	Badeo
Tonguey-Nalusbo Primary School	Madaymen

Secondary (2013-2014)
School	Barangay
Kibungan National High School	Poblacion
Madaymen National High School	Madaymen
Tacadang National High School	Tacadang
