= Kapangan =

Municipality in Benguet, Philippines

- Municipality
- Municipality of Kapangan
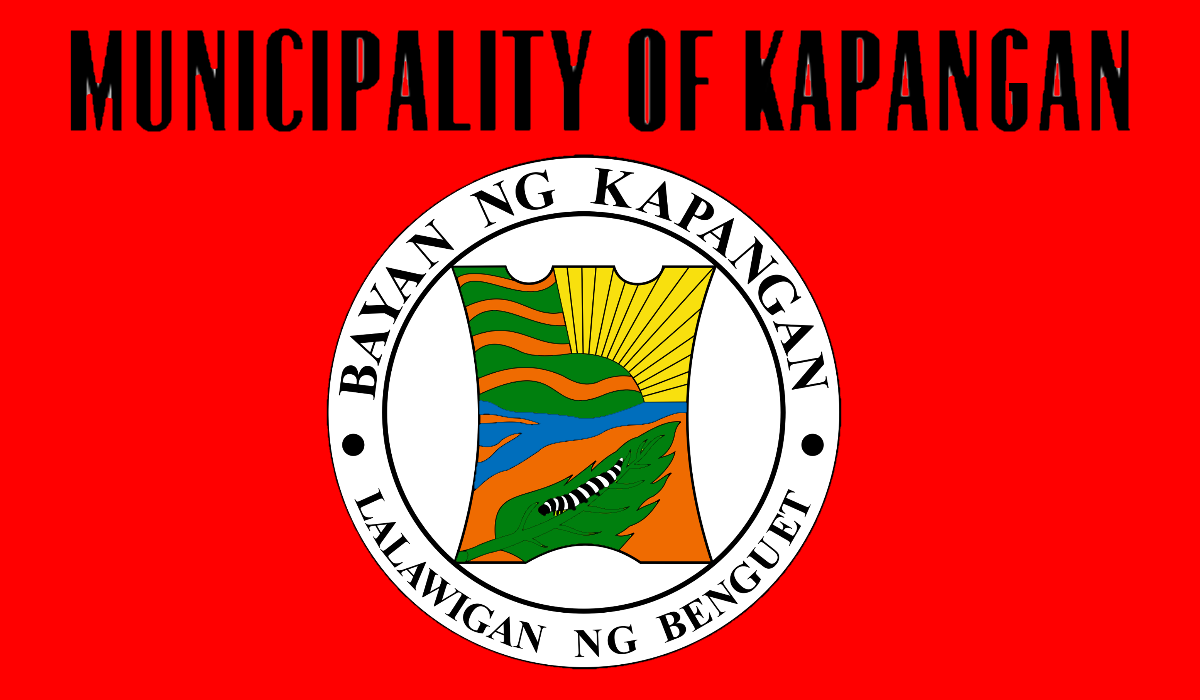
- Flag Seal

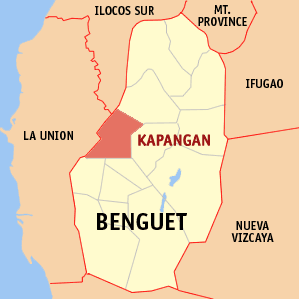
- Map of Benguet with Kapangan highlighted
- Interactive map of Kapangan
- Location within the Philippines
- Coordinates: 16°34′35″N 120°36′19″E
- Country: Philippines
- Region: Cordillera Administrative Region
- Province: Benguet
- District: Lone district
- Founded: 1900
- Barangays: 15 (see Barangays)

Government
  - Type: Sangguniang Bayan
  - Mayor: Harris M. Dizon
  - Vice Mayor: Santos M. Bastian
  - Representative: Eric Go Yap
  - Municipal Council: Members: Bruno M. Canuto; Rechel T. Marcelo; Maribelle I. Diclas; Grant A. Balagsa; Johnson S. Andiso; Anthony T. Andong; Hector D. Mariano; Danny T. Eke
  - Electorate: 14,929 voters (2025)

Area
  - Total: 164.39 km^{2} (63.47 sq mi)
- Elevation: 1,016 m (3,333 ft)
- Highest elevation: 1,459 m (4,787 ft)
- Lowest elevation: 540 m (1,770 ft)

Population (2024 census)
  - Total: 20,048
  - Density: 121.95/km^{2} (315.86/sq mi)
  - Households: 4,626

Economy
  - Income class: 3rd municipal income class
  - Poverty incidence: 12.88% (2023)
  - Revenue: ₱ 144.5 million (2024)
  - Assets: ₱ 333.3 million (2024)
  - Expenditure: ₱ 145.1 million (2024)
  - Liabilities: ₱ 29.22 million (2024)

Service provider
  - Electricity: Benguet Electric Cooperative (BENECO)
- Time zone: UTC+8 (PST)
- ZIP code: 2613
- PSGC: 1401108000
- IDD : area code: +63 (0)74
- Native languages: Kankanaey; Ibaloi; Ilocano; Tagalog
- Website: www.kapangan.gov.ph

Kapangan, officially the Municipality of Kapangan, (Ilocano: Ili ti Kapangan; Tagalog: Bayan ng Kapangan), is a municipality in the province of Benguet, Philippines. According to the 2024 census, it has a population of 20,048 people.

== History ==
=== Pre-colonial period ===
Kapangan was formerly called Takdang (or Tacdang), which means "people from the east". The early natives, who came from eastern settlements such as Tinec in Buguias and Bontoc, settled along the Amburayan River and lived by the kaingin system. They traveled to Naguilian in La Union to trade goods with the Ilocano people The appointed first town president (before now mayor) is Espiritu Cariño (1898–1900) .

=== Spanish period ===
During the Spanish Regime, Kapangan was organized into four barrios; Balacbac, Paykek, Pongayan, and Taba-ao. The Spaniards appointed Espiritu Cariño as the first Capitan del Barrio, whose duty was overseeing tax collection from local land owners. They also appointed Juan Ora-a Cariño to the position, eventually promoting him to Commandantes, one of the highest ranks in office during the time. Both Espiritu Cariño and Juan Ora-a Cariño appointed eight people in eight different barrios to serve as barrio capitans, whose tasks were to oversee the construction of Spanish trails throughout the mountain region.

=== American period ===
Under the American Civil Government, Kapangan was established as one of the 19 townships of the province of Benguet, upon the issuance of Act No. 48 on November 22, 1900

On August 13, 1908, Benguet was established as a sub-province of the newly created Mountain Province with the enactment of Act No. 1876. Six townships of Benguet were later abolished, one of which was Balakbak, which was integrated into the township of Kapangan.

According to some stories, Kapangan got its name when an American once asked a local resident what was the name of the place. Since the resident doesn't understand English and so happened that they were about to eat in the party where they were in, she just said "kapangan" which means go eat in English. The American thought that the name of the place is Kapangan and hence the name .

=== Post-war era ===
On June 25, 1963, then-President Diosdado Macapagal issued Executive Order No. 42 converting eight (8) of the thirteen (13) towns (designated as municipal districts) of Benguet sub-province into regular municipalities. Kapangan was among them.

On June 18, 1966, the sub-province of Benguet was separated from the old Mountain Province and was converted into a regular province. Kapangan remained to be a component municipality of the newly established province.

== Geography ==
The Municipality of Kapangan is at the mid-western section of Benguet. It is bounded by Kibungan on the north-east, Atok on the east, Tublay on the southeast, Sablan and Bagulin on the south-west, San Gabriel on the mid-west, and Sugpon on the north-west.

According to the Philippine Statistics Authority, the municipality has a land area of 164.39 square kilometres (63.47 sq mi) constituting 5.94% of the 2,769.08-square-kilometre- (1,069.15 sq mi) total area of Benguet.

The municipal's terrain is characterized by rugged mountains and hills. Rugged mountains have slopes of 50% while hills have slopes from 30%-50%. The highest elevation is 1,700 metres (5,600 ft) above sea level with the lowest at 200 metres (660 ft) above sea level.

Kapangan is situated 27.32 kilometres (16.98 mi) from the provincial capital La Trinidad, and 280.26 kilometres (174.15 mi) from the country's capital city of Manila.

=== Barangays ===
Kapangan is politically subdivided into 15 barangays. Each barangay consists of puroks and some have sitios.

PSGC	Barangay	Population			±% p.a.	
		2024		2010		
141108001	Balakbak	6.0%	1,205	1,372	▾	−0.89%
141108002	Beleng‑Belis	3.9%	772	984	▾	−1.66%
141108003	Boklaoan	2.3%	465	644	▾	−2.22%
141108004	Cayapes	4.2%	849	962	▾	−0.86%
141108006	Cuba	5.1%	1,018	995	▴	0.16%
141108008	Datakan	9.4%	1,883	1,699	▴	0.71%
141108009	Gadang	6.9%	1,378	1,534	▾	−0.74%
141108010	Gaswiling	5.0%	1,005	1,129	▾	−0.80%
141108011	Labueg	8.5%	1,702	1,572	▴	0.55%
141108013	Paykek	7.4%	1,488	1,550	▾	−0.28%
141108014	Poblacion Central	8.1%	1,618	1,841	▾	−0.89%
141108016	Pongayan	4.3%	869	945	▾	−0.58%
141108015	Pudong	6.1%	1,231	1,373	▾	−0.75%
141108017	Sagubo	9.9%	1,982	1,697	▴	1.08%
141108018	Taba‑ao	9.1%	1,832	1,787	▴	0.17%
	Total		20,048	19,297	▴	0.26%

=== Climate ===
Climate data for Kapangan, Benguet
Month	Jan	Feb	Mar	Apr	May	Jun	Jul	Aug	Sep	Oct	Nov	Dec	Year
Mean daily maximum °C (°F)	24 (75)	25 (77)	26 (79)	27 (81)	26 (79)	25 (77)	24 (75)	24 (75)	24 (75)	25 (77)	25 (77)	25 (77)	25 (77)
Mean daily minimum °C (°F)	15 (59)	16 (61)	17 (63)	19 (66)	20 (68)	20 (68)	19 (66)	19 (66)	19 (66)	18 (64)	17 (63)	16 (61)	18 (64)
Average precipitation mm (inches)	42 (1.7)	48 (1.9)	74 (2.9)	110 (4.3)	269 (10.6)	275 (10.8)	362 (14.3)	325 (12.8)	330 (13.0)	306 (12.0)	126 (5.0)	61 (2.4)	2,328 (91.7)
Average rainy days	11.2	12.0	17.1	21.2	27.1	26.8	28.1	27.0	26.0	24.5	17.7	12.4	251.1
Source: Meteoblue

Climate is divided into two seasons – the wet and the dry. Wet season occurs from May to October while dry season occurs November to April.

== Demographics ==
Population census of Kapangan
Year	Pop.	±% p.a.
1903	28	—
1918	3,916	+39.01%
1939	6,539	+2.47%
1948	8,184	+2.52%
1960	10,707	+2.26%
1970	12,221	+1.33%
1975	12,793	+0.92%
1980	13,381	+0.90%
1990	15,537	+1.51%
1995	15,326	−0.26%
2000	18,137	+3.68%
2007	18,221	+0.06%
2010	20,084	+3.61%
2015	19,361	−0.70%
2020	19,297	−0.07%
2024	20,048	+0.92%
Source: Philippine Statistics Authority

In the 2024 census, Kapangan had a population of 20,048 people. The population density was 120 inhabitants per square kilometre (310/sq mi).

=== Religion ===
- Ascension Episcopal Mission, Cabilisan, Pudong
- Balakbak Southern Baptist Church, Balakbak
- Duntog Kalbaryo Lutheran Church, Balakbak
- Iglesia ni Cristo, Lokal ng Balakbak
- Iglesia ni Cristo, Lokal ng Kapangan
- Kingdom Hall of Jehovah's Witnesses, Central
- Mount Zion Lutheran Church, Liblibeng, Gadang
- Taba-ao Faith Baptist Church, Taba-ao
- Saint Andrew's Episcopal Parish, Paykek
- Saint Luke Lutheran Church, Taba-ao
- Saint Mark Episcopal Mission, Gadang
- Saint Mark Lutheran Church, Landing, Sagubo
- Saint Michael Catholic Mission, Labueg
- Solid Foundation Bible Baptist Church, Lomon

== Economy ==
Poverty incidence of Kapangan (%)

Source: Philippine Statistics Authority

The main source of economy in Kapangan is agriculture. Kapangan produces rice, corn, vegetables, and fruit trees. Kapangan is famous for its tiger grass, which is the source for broom-making industry. Kapangan raises swine and poultry as sources of livestock.

Kapangan focuses on scenic trekking and waterfalls as integral parts of its tourism sector.

== Government ==
Kapangan, belonging to the lone congressional district of the province of Benguet, is governed by a mayor designated as its local chief executive and by a municipal council as its legislative body in accordance with the Local Government Code. The mayor, vice mayor, and the councilors are elected directly by the people through an election which is being held every three years.

=== Elected officials ===
Members of the Municipal Council (2025-2028)
Position	Name
Congressman	Eric Yap
Mayor	Harris M. Dizon
Vice-Mayor	Santos M. Bastian
Councilors	Bruno M. Canuto
Councilors	Rechel T. Marcelo
Councilors	Maribelle I. Diclas
Councilors	Grant A. Balagsa
Councilors	Johnson S. Andiso
Councilors	Anthony T. Andong
Councilors	Hector D. Mariano
Councilors	Danny T. Eke

== Education ==
The Kapangan Schools District Office governs all educational institutions within the municipality. It oversees the management and operations of all private and public, from primary to secondary schools.

=== Public schools ===
As of 2014, Kapangan has 27 public elementary schools, 1 private secondary school, and 4 public secondary schools.

Elementary (2013–2014)
School	Barangay
Ampongot Elementary School	Sagubo
Baguionas Barrio School	Gaswiling
Balakbak Elementary School	Balakbak
Beleng-Belis Barrio School	Beleng-Belis
Boklaoan Elementary School	Ampucao
Catiaoan Barrio School	Gaswiling
Cayapes Barrio School	Cayapes
Cuba Barrio School	Cuba
Datakan Elementary School	Datakan
Gadang Elementary School	Gadang
Gaswiling Barrio School	Gaswiling
Kaliwaga Barrio School	Gaswiling
Kapangan Central School	Poblacion (Central)
Laoangan Barrio School	Gadang
Liblibeng Barrio School	Gadang
Lomon Elementary School	Paykek
Longboy Elementary School	Labueg
Pakawan Barrio School	Cuba
Paykek Elementary School	Paykek
Pongayan Barrio School	Pongayan
Pudong Elementary School	Pudong
Sagubo Elementary School	Sagubo
Taba-ao Elementary School	Taba-ao
Tadayan Barrio School	Pudong
Tawang Barrio School	Beleng-Belis
Toplac Barrio School	Cuba
Ubod Barrio School	Taba-ao

Secondary (2013–2014)
School	Barangay
Governor Bado Dangwa Agro-Industrial School	Balakbak
Governor Bado Dangwa Agro-Industrial School Extension – Taba-ao Annex	Taba-ao
Kapangan Central National High School	Poblacion (Central)
Kapangan National High School	Sagubo

Private School

Secondary (2023)
School	Barangay
Saint Theresita's High School of Kapangan Incorporated	Labueg
