= Kabayan, Benguet =

Municipality in the Philippines

Kabayan
- Municipality
- Municipality of Kabayan
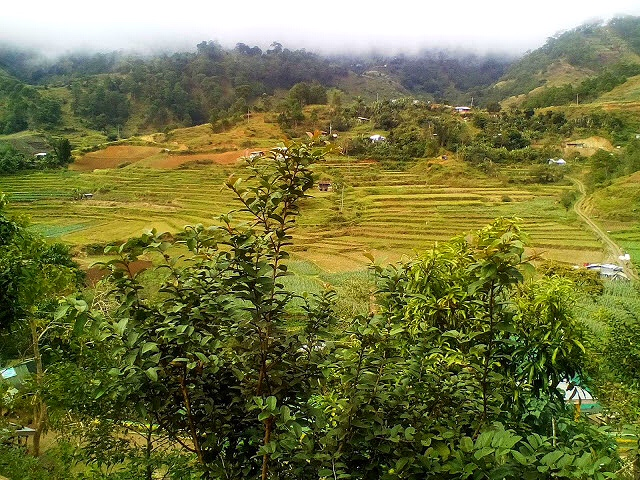
- Rice terraces

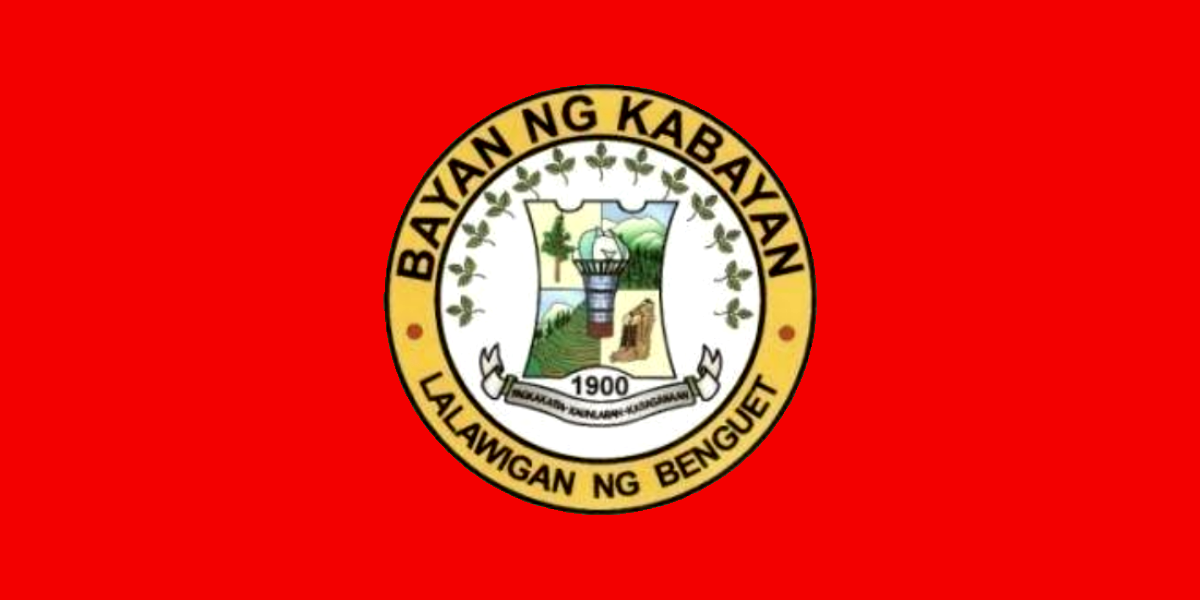
- Flag Seal

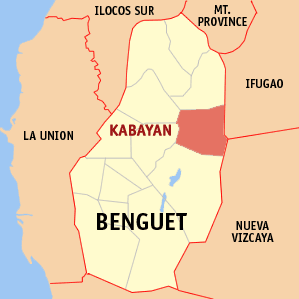
- Map of Benguet with Kabayan highlighted
- Interactive map of Kabayan
- Location within the Philippines
- Coordinates: 16°37′24″N 120°50′17″E
- Country: Philippines
- Region: Cordillera Administrative Region
- Province: Benguet
- District: Lone district
- Barangays: 13 (see Barangays)

Government
  - Type: Sangguniang Bayan
  - Mayor: Rex Alwin G. Aquisan
  - Vice Mayor: Sario M. Minas
  - Representative: Eric Go Yap
  - Municipal Council: Members: Mirkoles A. Lamses; Rudy B. Alos; Pelino B. Bugnay; Sandy L. Wa-is; Eugene M. Daoal; Marlon B. Nginsayan; Marylou B. Cosalan; Ghislyn L. Marave
  - Electorate: 10,506 voters (2025)

Area
  - Total: 242.69 km^{2} (93.70 sq mi)
- Elevation: 1,613 m (5,292 ft)
- Highest elevation: 2,688 m (8,819 ft)
- Lowest elevation: 932 m (3,058 ft)

Population (2024 census)
  - Total: 15,841
  - Density: 65.273/km^{2} (169.06/sq mi)
  - Households: 3,752

Economy
  - Income class: 3rd municipal income class
  - Poverty incidence: 12.85% (2023)
  - Revenue: ₱ 162 million (2024)
  - Assets: ₱ 440.4 million (2024)
  - Expenditure: ₱ 130.7 million (2024)
  - Liabilities: ₱ 100.6 million (2024)

Service provider
  - Electricity: Benguet Electric Cooperative (BENECO)
- Time zone: UTC+8 (PST)
- ZIP code: 2606
- PSGC: 1401107000
- IDD : area code: +63 (0)74
- Native languages: Kankanaey; Ibaloi; Ilocano; Tagalog

Kabayan, officially the Municipality of Kabayan (Ilocano: Ili ti Kabayan; Tagalog: Bayan ng Kabayan), is a municipality in the province of Benguet, Philippines. According to the 2024 census, it has a population of 15,841 people.

The town is the site of centuries-old Ibaloi mummies buried inside caves scattered around its villages. The third highest mountain in the Philippines, Mount Pulag, is located in the territorial boundary of the vegetable farming town.

== Etymology ==
The name Kabayan was derived from the term Kaba-ayan, from the Ibaloi word ba-ay, a root crop vine thriving in the place. Most of the early Ibaloi settlements, in the area, which include Eddet and Duacan, were named after grasses in the heavily forested area.

== History ==
=== Pre-colonial period ===
The first Ibaloi settlers in Benguet arrived at Imbose (or Embosi), located in present-day Kabayan.

Mummification of the dead was practiced long before Spanish colonizers reached the place.

=== Spanish period ===
In the late 1800s, Spanish colonizers reached Kabayan via trails constructed throughout the mountain region. Organized into three rancherias, namely Adaoay, Kabayan, and Lutab (or Dutab), Kabayan was registered under the comandancia politico-militar of Benguet in 1846. Lutab (currently barangay Poblacion or Kabayan Central) was later integrated into the Kabayan rancheria.

The practice of mummification of the dead would be discouraged by the Spaniards, until it would die out.

=== American period ===
During the American rule, Kabayan and Adaoay were established as two of the 19 townships of the province of Benguet, upon the issuance of Act No. 48 by the Philippine Commission on November 22, 1900.

On August 13, 1908, Benguet would be established with the enactment of Act No. 1876 as a sub-province of the newly created Mountain Province. Six townships of Benguet were later abolished, including Adaoay, which was integrated into the township of Kabayan.

=== Post-war Era ===
On June 25, 1963, then-President Diosdado Macapagal issued Executive Order No. 42 converting eight (8) of the thirteen (13) towns (designated as municipal districts) of Benguet sub-province into regular municipalities. Kabayan was among them.

On June 18, 1966, the sub-province of Benguet was separated from the old Mountain Province and would be converted into a regular province. Kabayan remained to be a component municipality of the newly established province.

== Geography ==
The Municipality of Kabayan is located at 16°37′24″N 120°50′17″E, at the central-eastern section of Benguet. It is bounded by Buguias on the north, Kibungan on the north-west, Atok on the south-west, Bokod on the south, Kayapa on the southeast, and Tinoc on the north-east.

According to the Philippine Statistics Authority, the municipality has a land area of 242.69 square kilometres (93.70 sq mi) constituting 8.76% of the 2,769.08-square-kilometre- (1,069.15 sq mi) total area of Benguet.

Kabayan is situated 63.50 kilometres (39.46 mi) from the provincial capital La Trinidad, and 316.43 kilometres (196.62 mi) from the country's capital city of Manila.

=== Barangays ===
Kabayan is politically subdivided into 13 barangays. Each barangay consists of puroks and some have sitios.

PSGC	Barangay	Population			±% p.a.	
		2024		2010		
141107001	Adaoay	4.4%	692	670	▴	0.22%
141107002	Anchukey	1.8%	290	296	▾	−0.14%
141107003	Ballay	19.0%	3,011	2,623	▴	0.96%
141107004	Bashoy	13.7%	2,165	1,597	▴	2.12%
141107005	Batan	6.8%	1,072	944	▴	0.88%
141107009	Duacan	4.8%	758	709	▴	0.46%
141107010	Eddet	5.9%	927	740	▴	1.56%
141107012	Gusaran	9.2%	1,460	1,330	▴	0.64%
141107013	Kabayan Barrio	2.7%	423	337	▴	1.58%
141107014	Lusod	5.5%	872	794	▴	0.65%
141107016	Pacso	7.6%	1,208	1,247	▾	−0.22%
141107017	Poblacion (Central)	12.1%	1,918	1,567	▴	1.40%
141107018	Tawangan	6.4%	1,010	734	▴	2.22%
	Total		15,841	15,806	▴	0.02%

In the 2010 Census of Population and Housing, Barangay Anchukey would be the least populated barangay in the province of Benguet.

=== Climate ===
Climate data for Kabayan, Benguet
Month	Jan	Feb	Mar	Apr	May	Jun	Jul	Aug	Sep	Oct	Nov	Dec	Year
Mean daily maximum °C (°F)	21 (70)	22 (72)	23 (73)	25 (77)	24 (75)	24 (75)	23 (73)	23 (73)	23 (73)	23 (73)	22 (72)	21 (70)	23 (73)
Mean daily minimum °C (°F)	13 (55)	14 (57)	15 (59)	17 (63)	18 (64)	18 (64)	18 (64)	18 (64)	18 (64)	17 (63)	15 (59)	14 (57)	16 (61)
Average precipitation mm (inches)	38 (1.5)	57 (2.2)	77 (3.0)	141 (5.6)	390 (15.4)	355 (14.0)	426 (16.8)	441 (17.4)	426 (16.8)	259 (10.2)	97 (3.8)	57 (2.2)	2,764 (108.9)
Average rainy days	10.4	12.1	15.4	20.4	26.7	27.1	28.7	28.0	26.4	19.9	14.1	12.3	241.5
Source: Meteoblue (modeled/calculated data, not measured locally)

== Demographics ==
Population census of Kabayan
Year	Pop.	±% p.a.
1903	22	—
1918	2,841	+38.27%
1939	4,190	+1.87%
1948	3,805	−1.07%
1960	5,869	+3.68%
1970	7,116	+1.94%
1975	8,363	+3.29%
1980	9,072	+1.64%
1990	10,306	+1.28%
1995	10,510	+0.37%
2000	12,344	+3.51%
2007	12,657	+0.35%
2010	13,588	+2.62%
2015	15,260	+2.23%
2020	15,806	+0.74%
2024	15,841	+0.05%
Source: Philippine Statistics Authority

In the 2024 census, Kabayan had a population of 15,841 people. The population density was 65 inhabitants per square kilometre (170/sq mi).

== Economy ==
Poverty incidence of Kabayan (%)

Source: Philippine Statistics Authority

The economy of Kabayan is primarily driven by agriculture and small-scale enterprises. Kabayan's farmers grow temperate vegetables, Arabica coffee, and rice. Mining and natural resources contribute to Kabayan's economy through mineral extraction and forest products. Small-scale enterprises bolster the food processing and handicraft production of Kabayan.

== Government ==
Kabayan, belonging to the lone congressional district of the province of Benguet, is governed by a mayor designated as its local chief executive and by a municipal council as its legislative body in accordance with the Local Government Code. The mayor, vice mayor, and the councilors are elected directly by the people through an election which is being held every three years.

=== Elected officials ===
Members of the Municipal Council (2025-2028)
Position	Name
Congressman	Eric Yap
Mayor	Rex Alwin G. Aquisan
Vice-Mayor	Sario M. Minas
Councilors	Mirkoles A. Lamses
Councilors	Rudy B. Alos
Councilors	Pelino B. Bugnay
Councilors	Sandy L. Wa-is
Councilors	Eugene M. Daoal
Councilors	Marlon B. Nginsayan
Councilors	Marylou B. Cosalan
Councilors	Ghislyn L. Marave

== Tourism ==
Kabayan is best known for the antiquated centuries-old mummies and Mount Pulag, the third highest mountain in the Philippines. The Kabayan mummy burial caves are officially proclaimed Philippine National Cultural Treasures pursuant to Presidential Decree No. 374, and is under consideration as a World Heritage Site. The mummified body of Apo Annu, a tribal leader, was stolen but recovered by an antique collector and was returned to the town. Archaeologists from various countries have visited the town to promote preservation of the mummies due to deterioration of the cadavers. The caves containing the cadavers of these mummies have been declared by Monument Watch as one of the "100 Most Endangered Sites" in the world.

Mount Pulag is a destination for mountaineers, hikers, including picnickers. At its summit, the climbers can see the surroundings of the whole north Luzon.

Kabayan also hosts a branch of the National Museum of the Philippines.

== Education ==
The Kabayan Schools District Office governs all educational institutions within the municipality. It oversees the management and operations of all private and public, from primary to secondary schools.

=== Public schools ===
As of 2014, Kabayan has 22 public elementary schools and 3 public secondary schools.

Elementary (2013-2014)
School	Barangay
Abucot Elementary School	Eddet
Adaoay Elementary School	Adaoay
Anchokey Primary School	Anchokey
Asokong Pacso Elementary School	Gusaran
Asokong Pacso Elementary School - Annex	Pacso
Awing Primary School	Adaoay
Ballay Elementary School	Ballay
Bashoy Elementary School	Bashoy
Batan Elementary School	Batan
Bio B. Midol Elementary School	Ballay
Chapides Primary School	Gusaran
Duacan Primary School	Duacan
Eddet Elementary School	Adaoay
Kabayan Barrio Elementary School	Kabayan Barrio
Kabayan Central School	Poblacion
Lebeng Primary School	Bashoy
Lusod Elementary School	Lusod
Mongoto Elementary School	(Timbac)
Mt. Pulag Primary School	Bashoy
Tamang Elementary School	Batan
Tawangan Elementary School	Tawangan
Tinaleb Elementary School	Ballay

Secondary (2013-2014)
School	Barangay
Adaoay National High School	Adaoay
Kamora National High School	Gusaran
Tawangan-Lusod National High School	Tawangan
