= N204 highway (Philippines) =

Road in the Philippines

Route 204
- Ilocos Sur–Abra Road; Abra–Kalinga Road; Mountain Province–Cagayan Road via Tabuk–Enrile; Halsema Highway; Magsaysay Avenue
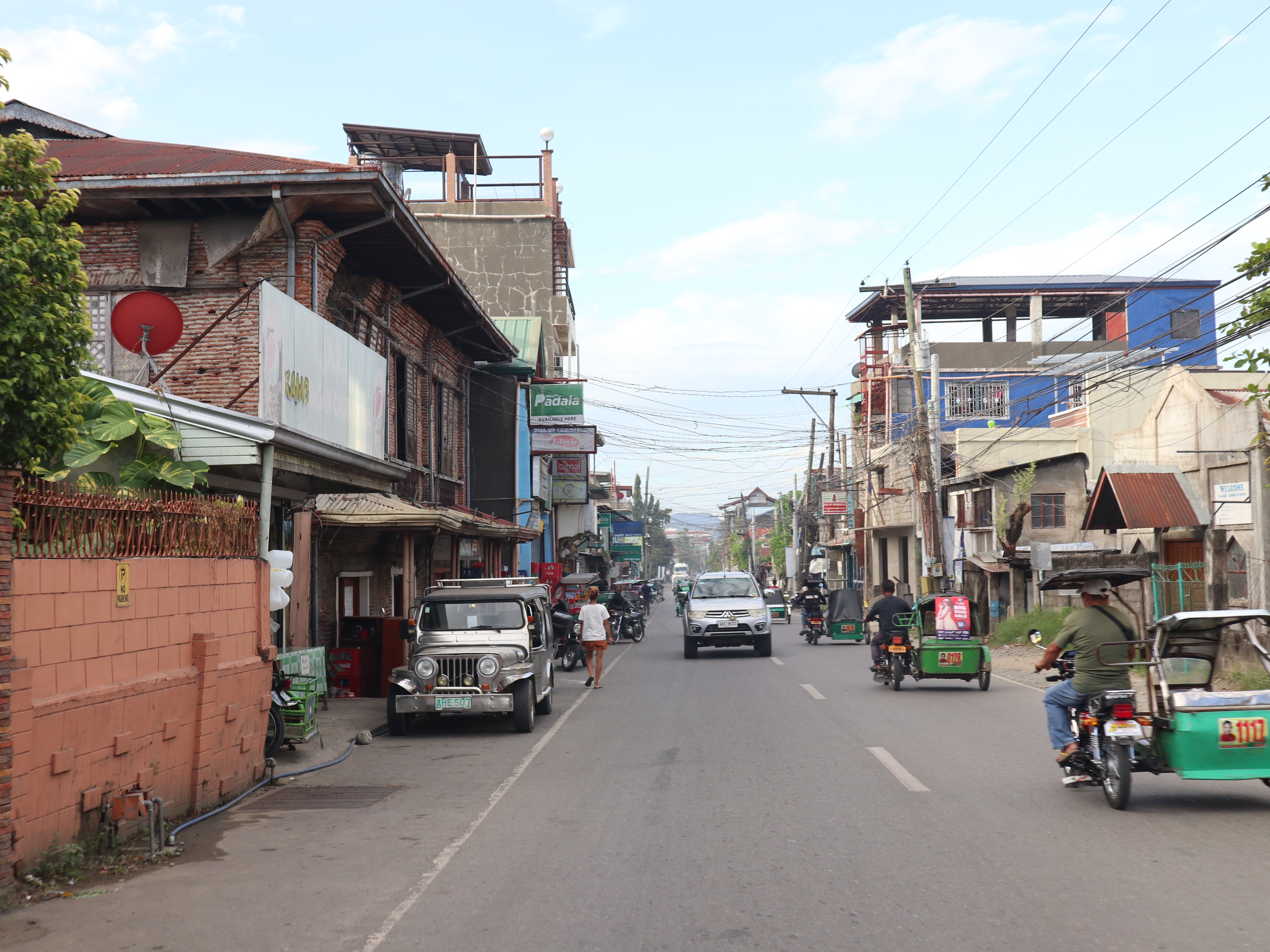
- Abra–Kalinga Road, part of Route 204 running through the town of Bangued, Abra.

Route information
- Maintained by the Department of Public Works and Highways
- Length: 388.06 km (241.13 mi)

Major junctions
- From: N231 (Session Road) / Magsaysay Avenue in Baguio
- A. Bonifacio Road in Baguio; Manuel Roxas Street in Baguio; Pico–Lamtang Road in La Trinidad; Gov. Bado Dangwa National Road in Tublay and Buguias; N207 (Cong. Andres Acop Cosalan Road) / Cervantes–Mankayan–Abatan Road in Buguias and Mankayan; N205 (Tagudin–Cervantes–Sabangan Road) in Sabangan; N206 (Rev. John A. Staunton Road) in Bontoc; N109 (Bontoc–Banaue Road) in Bontoc; N222 (Mt. Province–Tabuk–Enrile–Cagayan Road) in Pasil
- To: N2 (Manila North Road) in Narvacan

Location
- Country: Philippines
- Provinces: Benguet; Ifugao; Mountain Province; Kalinga; Abra; Ilocos Sur
- Major cities: Baguio
- Towns: La Trinidad; Tublay; Atok; Bakun; Bauko; Bokod; Buguias; Mankayan; Hungduan; Kabayan; Sabangan; Bontoc; Sadanga; Tinglayan; Lubuagan; Pasil; Balbalan; Malibcong; Licuan-Baay; Lagangilang; Dolores; Tayum; Bangued; Pidigan; San Quintin; Narvacan

Highway system
- Roads in the Philippines; Highways; Expressways; List
← N203	→ N205

National Route 204 (N204) is a 388.06-kilometer (241.13 mi), two-to-four lane, secondary national road that forms part of the Philippine highway network. The route consists of several windy, mountainous, and often narrow and dangerous roads from the southwestern tip to the central regions of the Cordillera Mountain Range up until the province of Kalinga, and towards its western limits in Abra and Ilocos Sur.

== Route description ==
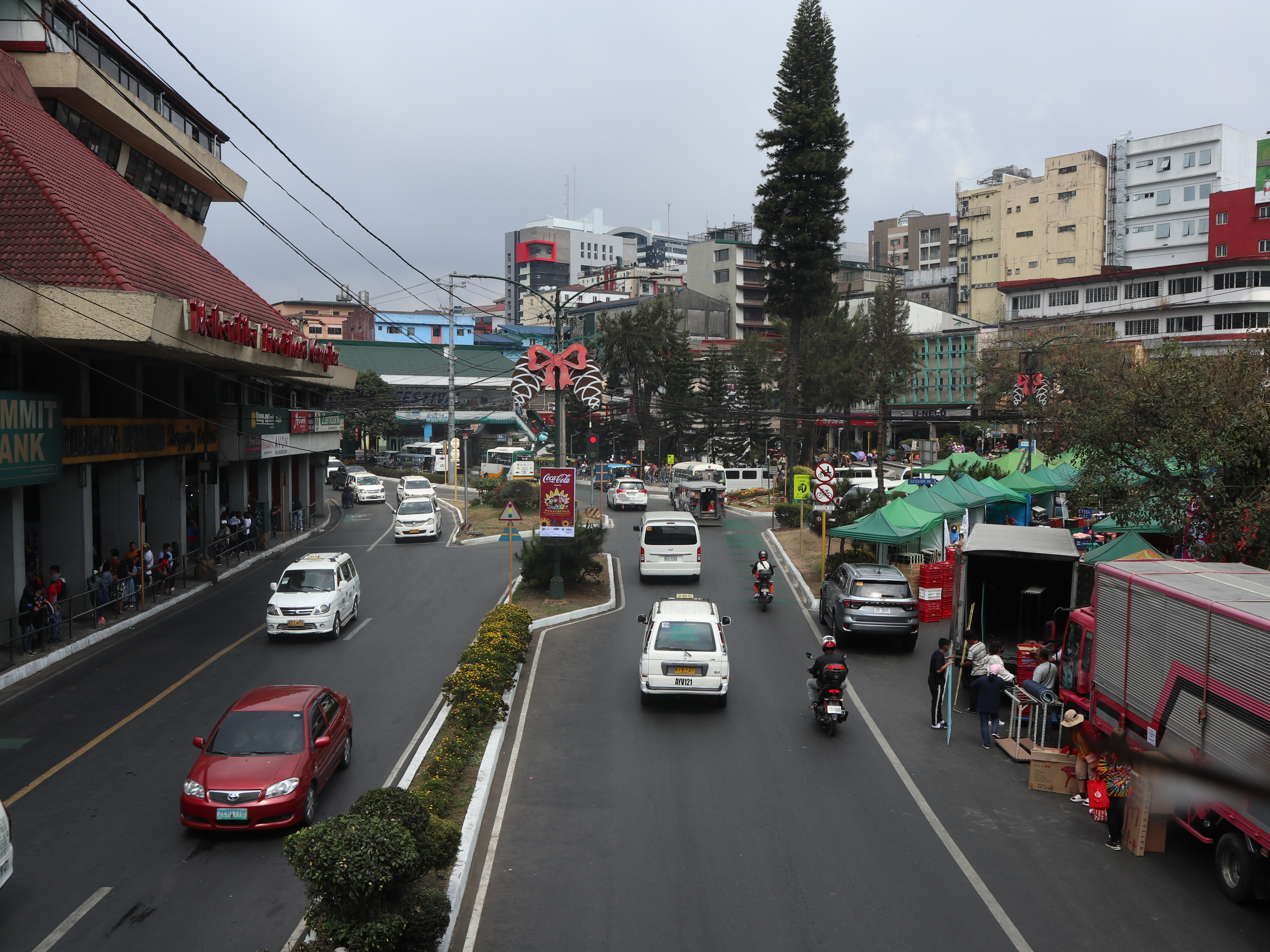
Magsaysay Avenue and Session Road intersection in Baguio, terminus of N204 beside Malcolm Square and the Maharlika Livelihood Complex.

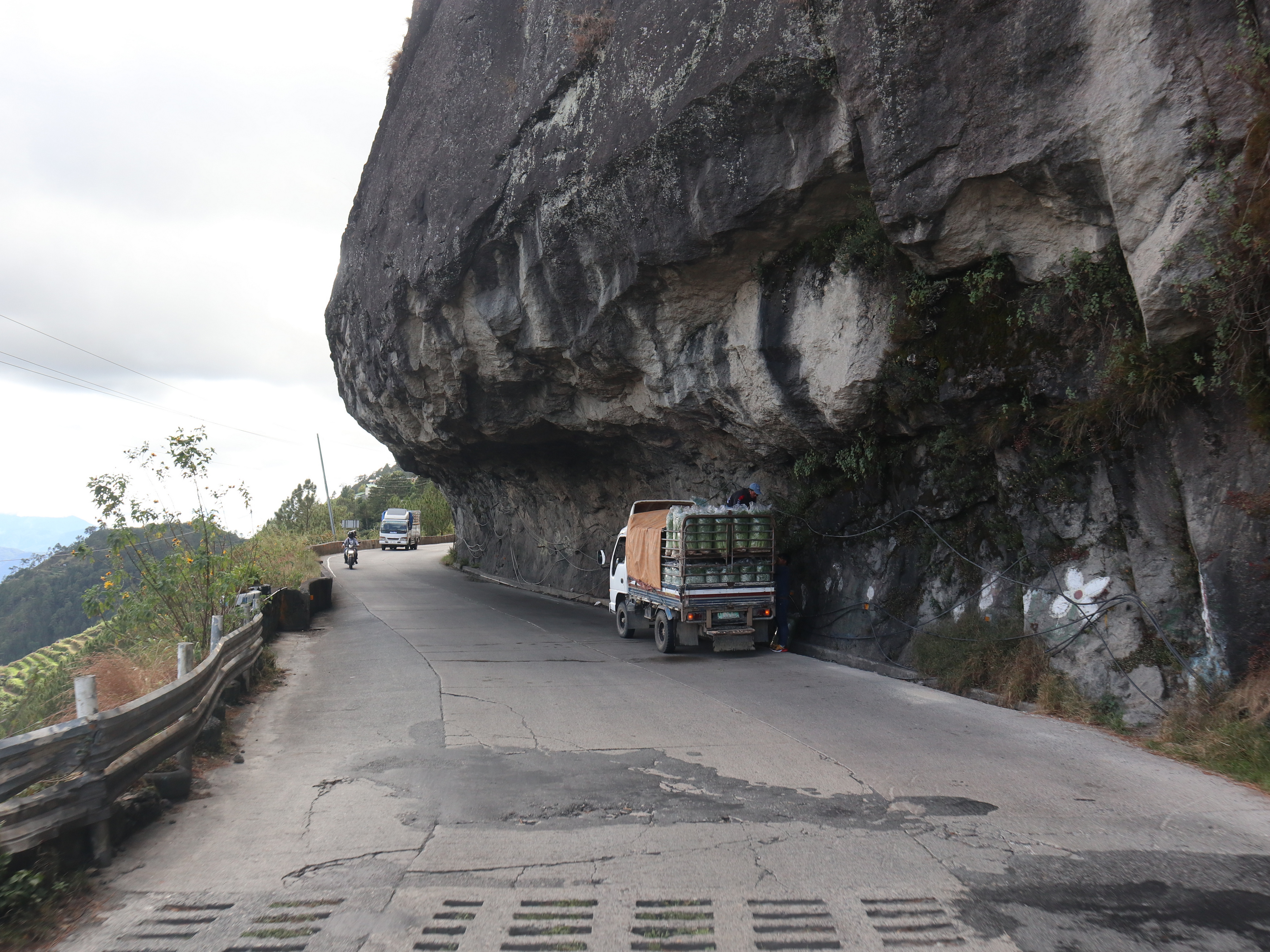
Half-tunnel section of the Halsema Highway in Atok, Benguet.

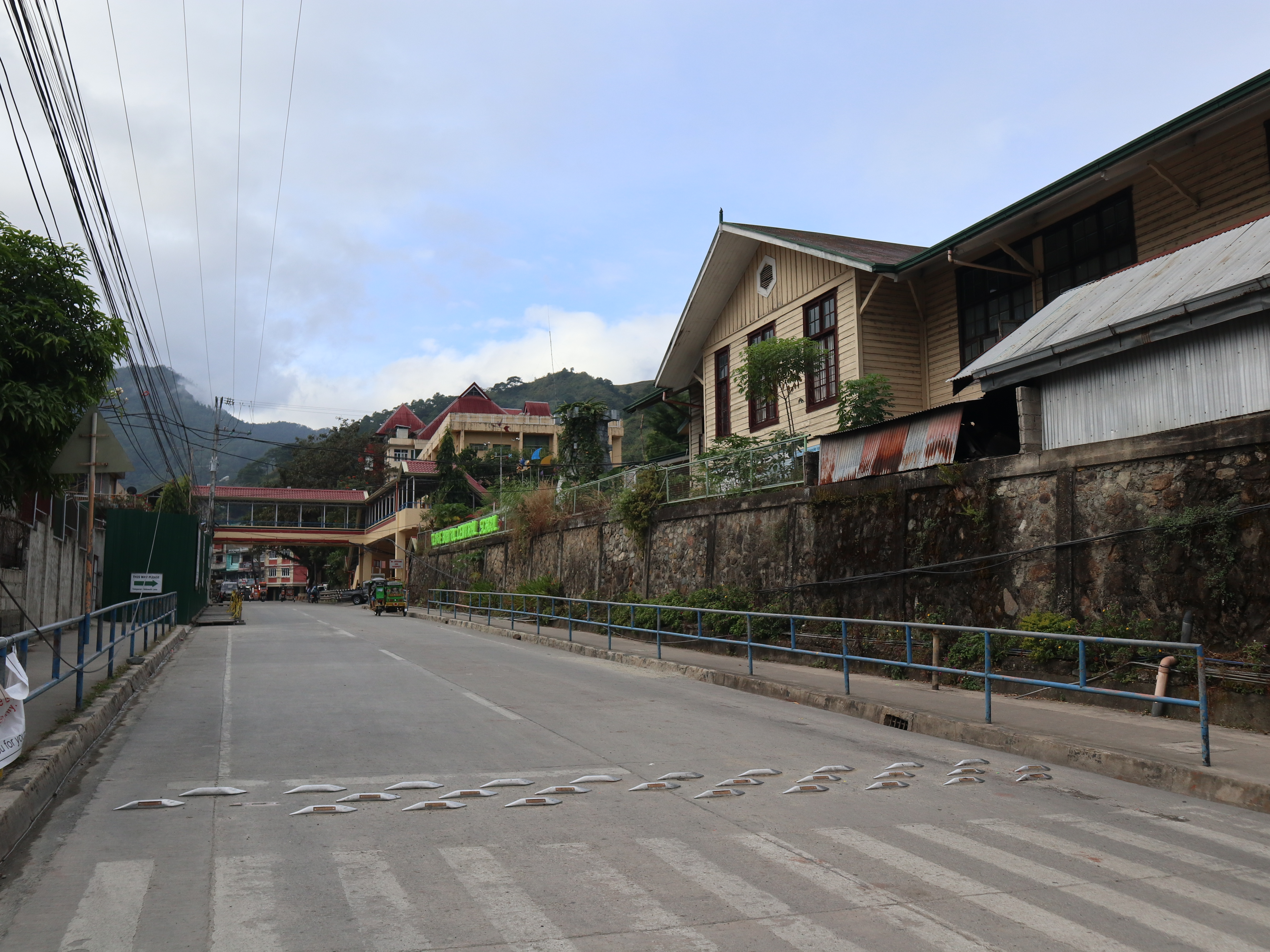
Route 204 after the junction with Bontoc–Banaue Road in Bontoc, Mountain Province.

=== Magsaysay Avenue ===
Route 204 starts as a four-lane road at the intersection with Session Road, passing through Malcolm Square and the Baguio City Market and turns to the left at the intersection with A. Bonifacio Road beside Baguio Center Mall. It then curves towards the intersection with Buhagan Road at the edge of the Balili River, passes Camdas and Trancoville Barangays, and slopes towards the city limits with La Trinidad where Magsaysay Avenue terminates while running parallel with the Balili River.

This section of the road spans 3.54 km (2.20 mi).

=== Halsema Highway ===
Route 204 continues as the Halsema Highway, or the Baguio–Bontoc Road, still as a four-lane road towards the La Trinidad Trading Post and the Benguet State University, La Trinidad campus in Brgy. Pico. It continues north towards the La Trinidad Strawberry Farm in Brgy. Betag and turns sharply right at the intersection with Pico–Buyagan Road in front of the Benguet Provincial Capitol complex. From the ramp going upwards the provincial capitol, the road turns into a two-lane highway, crossing Balili River once again towards the outskirts of La Trinidad into Tublay, where it meets with the Gov. Bado Dangwa Provincial Road just before the Halsema Highway tollgate. The road becomes windier after the gate, passes Atok, where the former highest point of the Philippine Highway System is located in Brgy. Cattubo, and towards the towns of Kabayan and Buguias, where it meets the major highways leading to Ilocos Sur and Ifugao at Abatan Junction. The route continues towards the border with Mountain Province, passing the foot of Mount Data towards Bauko, Sabangan, and to Bontoc. At this point, the road splits towards the tourist town of Sagada, and towards Bontoc town proper, where it ends at the junction with Bontoc–Banaue Road and the next leg of the route.

This section of the road spans 138.45 km (86.03 mi).

=== Mt. Province–Cagayan Road ===
The road continues as the Bontoc–Tabuk–Enrile Road, also known as the Mt. Province–Cagayan Road from the town proper of Bontoc still as a two-lane road, although from this point, road degradation is more noticeable due to the remoteness of the road and natural elements, such as landslides and rainfall. The road continues northeast into the last town of Mountain Province, Sadanga, and into the province of Kalinga via Tinglayan, where the Buscalan Tattoo Village is located. It continues to run parallel alongside the Chico River towards the towns of Lubuagan and Pasil, where the route ends at Cagaluan Junction, meeting with the next leg of the route. From this point, motorists can opt to follow the road northeast-ward towards the city of Tabuk, and towards Cagayan Valley through the town of Enrile.

This section of the road spans 71.52 km (44.44 mi).

=== Abra–Kalinga Road ===
At Cagaluan Junction, route 204 starts following the Abra–Kalinga Road alignment northwest-ward, passing through outer barangays of Pasil and the lower section of Balbalan town and heads toward the border of Kalinga with the province of Abra and slopes down from the mountains through the towns of Malibcong, Licuan-Baay, and Lagangilang, and Dolores, where it meets and crosses the Abra River through the town of Tayum and into the provincial capital of Bangued and terminates at the junction with Taft Avenue and Rizal Street.

The route follows the short length of Taft Avenue towards the next leg of the route, at the junction with Torrijos Street, right in front of the Victoria Park arch. This section of the road spans 143.95 km (89.45 mi).

=== Abra–Ilocos Sur Road ===
The final leg of the route is known as the Abra–Ilocos Sur Road, which starts at the southern end of the town of Bangued, still as a two-lane highway. The road now turns and slopes gently and goes straight in long distances through the outer towns of Abra, namely Pidigan and San Quintin, and terminates at the junction with the town of Narvacan in the province of Ilocos Sur.

This section of the road spans 30.6 km (19.0 mi).

== Intersections ==
Intersections are numbered by kilometer posts, with Rizal Park in Manila designated as kilometer zero.

Province	City/Municipality	km	mi	Destinations	Notes
Benguet	Baguio			N231 (Session Road) / Magsaysay Avenue – Burnham Park, Luneta Hill, Camp John Hay	Traffic light intersection. Continues as N204 towards Harrison Road.
Benguet	Baguio			E. Jacinto Street	Northbound segment only.
Benguet	Baguio			General Luna Road	Northbound segment only.
Benguet	Baguio			Rajah Matanda Street / A. Bonifacio Road	Traffic light intersection. Access to Aurora Hill and Saint Louis University.
Benguet	Baguio			Hilltop Street	
Benguet	Baguio			Fr. J. Burgos Street (Upper Padre Burgos Street)	Padre Burgos & Zamora Barangay road.
Benguet	Baguio			Fr. M. Gomez Street (Lower Padre Burgos Street)	Padre Burgos & Zamora Barangay road.
Benguet	Baguio			Balajadia Street	Sto. Niño Barangay road.
Benguet	Baguio			Buhagan Road (Bokawkan Road) — Naguilian, Sablan, Bauang	Accessible via Bokawkan Flyover service road. Leads to Camp Allen, Crescencia Village, Guisad & Campo Filipino. Terminates at N54 (Naguilian Road).
Benguet	Baguio			Adarna Street	Southbound segment only. Accessible via Buhagan Road or Trancoville Flyover service road.
Benguet	Baguio			Camdas Main Road	Camdas Barangay Road. Accessible via Trancoville Flyover service road.
Benguet	Baguio			Manuel Roxas Street	Access to Trancoville, Sanitary Camp, Brookside, and Aurora Hill Barangays.
Benguet	Baguio			Happy Homes Road	Happy Homes-Lucban Barangay road. Loops back to highway.
Benguet	Baguio			North Sanitary Camp Road — La Trinidad	Access to Sanitary Camp, Bayan Park, and Ambiong Barangays. Alternate access to La Trinidad via Ambiong.
Benguet	Baguio–La Trinidad boundary			End of Magsaysay Avenue alignment. Road continues as Baguio–Bontoc Road.	
Benguet	La Trinidad			Pico–Lamtang Road — Naguilian, Sablan, Bauang	Traffic light intersection. Terminates at N54 (Naguilian Road).
Benguet	La Trinidad			Trading Post Road	Access to La Trinidad Vegetable Trading Post.
Benguet	La Trinidad			Balili Road	
Benguet	La Trinidad			Strawberry Farm Road	Access to La Trinidad Strawberry Farm.
Benguet	La Trinidad			Pico–Buyagan Road	T-intersection in front of Benguet Provincial Capitol. Access to Sitio Buyagan & Brgy. Puguis.
Benguet	La Trinidad			Kangas Road	Sitio Kangas road.
Benguet	La Trinidad			Cruz–Samoyao–Alno Road	
Benguet	La Trinidad			Mount Kalugong Road	Access to Mt. Kalugong & Cultural Village, and Mt. Tayawang.
Benguet	La Trinidad			Alapang–Alno–Balluay Road	
Benguet	La Trinidad	257.570	160.047	Camp Dangwa–Bahong–Sadag Provincial Road	
Benguet	La Trinidad			Tawang–Ambiong Road — Baguio, Itogon, La Union	Access to Mt. Kalugong & Cultural Village, and Mt. Tayawang.
Benguet	La Trinidad	260.195	161.678	Km.12–Pagal–Talingting Provincial Road	
Benguet	La Trinidad			Shilan–Beckel Road — Itogon, Bokod, Baguio	Access to N110 (Baguio–Nueva Vizcaya Road).
Benguet	La Trinidad	260.640	161.954	Shilan–Sagpawe Provincial Road	
Benguet	Tublay			Tublay Municipal Hall Road	
Benguet	Tublay	262.844	163.324	Gov. Bado Dangwa National Road — Kapangan, Kibungan, Bakun	Also known as Acop–Kapangan–Kibungan Road.
Benguet	Tublay			King Solomon Sto. Niño–Coroz–Tabeyo Road	
Benguet	Tublay	271.650	168.795	Labey–Lacamen Provincial Road	
Benguet	Atok			Km. 22–Bilis Farm-to-Market Road	
Benguet	Atok	277.407	172.373	Jose Mencio Provincial Road	Access to Brgy. Naguey, Topdac, and Poblacion.
Benguet	Atok			Halsema Highroad Point Marker	
Benguet	Atok	304.100	188.959	Toludan–Sayangan Provincial Road	
Benguet	Kabayan			Mongoto–Kabayan Road — Kabayan, Buguias	Access to Timbac Mummy Caves and connects to N207 (Cong. Andres Acop Cosalan Road).
Benguet	Buguias			Natubleng–Nabalicong–Cabuguiasan–Pacso Road	
Benguet	Buguias	312.250	194.023	Halsema–Madaymen Provincial Road — Kibungan	
Benguet	Buguias			Gov. Bado Dangwa National Road — Kapangan, Kibungan, Bakun	North end of Gov. Dangwa Road.
Benguet	Buguias – Mankayan boundary			N207 (Cong. Andres Acop Cosalan Road) / Cervantes–Mankayan–Abatan Road – Cervantes, Mankayan, Kabayan	Abatan Junction.
Ifugao	Hungduan			No major junctions	
Mountain Province	Bauko			Sinto–Asbiagan–Bebe Road	
Mountain Province	Bauko			Sengyew Barangay Road	
Mountain Province	Bauko			Sadsadan–Balicanao–Sumeyang Road	
Mountain Province	Bauko			Maba-ay–Guinzadan–Abatan Road	Maba-ay Junction. Access to N205 (Tagudin–Cervantes–Sabangan Road).
Mountain Province	Sabangan			N205 (Tagudin–Cervantes–Sabangan Road) – Cervantes, Tadian	Nacagang Junction.
Mountain Province	Sabangan			Tambingan Road	
Mountain Province	Bontoc			Suyo–Mabisil–Payag-eo–Balili Road — Sagada	Access to Sagada town proper & Sumaguing Cave.
Mountain Province	Bontoc			N206 (Rev. John A. Staunton Road) – Sagada, Besao	Access to Sagada town proper & Sumaguing Cave.
Mountain Province	Bontoc			Balitian–Dalican Road	
Mountain Province	Bontoc			N109 (Bontoc–Banaue Road) – Banaue, Lagawe, Bagabag	End of Halsema Highway segment. Start of Bontoc–Tabuk–Enrile Road segment.
Mountain Province	Sadanga			Sadanga Road	Access to Sadanga town proper.
Mountain Province – Kalinga boundary	Sadanga – Tinglayan boundary			Mamaga–Saclit Road	Access to Brgy. Saclit in Sadanga.
Kalinga	Tinglayan			Bugnay–Buscalan Road	Access to Buscalan Tattoo Village.
Kalinga	Tinglayan			Poblacion–Tulgao Road	
Kalinga	Tinglayan			Mallango–Sumadel–Belong Road	
Kalinga	Lubuagan			Lubuagan–Batong Buhay–Abra Boundary Road	
Kalinga	Pasil			N222 (Mountain Province–Tabuk–Enrile–Cagayan Road) – Tabuk, Enrile, Tuao	Cagaluan Junction. End of Bontoc–Tabuk–Enrile Road segment. Start of Kalinga–Abra Road segment.
Kalinga	Pasil			Cagaluan–Ableg Road	Links to N222 (Bontoc–Tabuk–Enrile Road).
Kalinga	Pasil			Limood–Magsilay–Amdalao–Guinaang Road	
Kalinga	Balbalan			Pinukpuk–Balbalan Road — Pinukpuk, Tuao	
Abra	Malibcong			Malibcong–Taripan–Duldulao Road	
Abra	Licuan-Baay			Licuan-Baay–Baquero Road / Baquero–Bulbulala Road	
Abra	Licuan-Baay			Licuan-Baay Road	Access to Licuan-Baay town proper.
Abra	Licuan-Baay			Bacooc–Lacub Road — Lacub	
Abra	Lagangilang			Abra–Cervantes Road — Sallapadan, Manabo	
Abra	Dolores			Talogtog–Dolores–San Juan Road — San Juan	
Abra	Tayum			Tayum–Bucay Road — Bucay, Peñarrubia	
Abra	Bangued			Abra–Ilocos Norte Road — Danglas, La Paz, Nueva Era	
Abra	Bangued			Taft Avenue / Rizal Street	End of Abra–Kalinga Road segment.
Abra	Bangued			Torrijos Street	Road continues south as Torrijos Street. Start of Abra–Ilocos Sur Road segment.
Abra	Bangued			Sinalang–Peñarrubia–Bucay Road — Bucay, Peñarrubia	
Abra	Pidigan			Pidigan–San Isidro–Villaviciosa–Pilar–Pang-ot Provincial Road — San Isidro, Pilar	
Abra	San Quintin			Villa Mercedes–Poblacion Road	Access to San Quintin town proper.
Ilocos Sur	Narvacan			N2 (Manila North Road) – Vigan, Laoag, Candon, Manila	Route terminus at Narvacan–Abra Junction. End of Abra–Ilocos Sur Road segment.
1.000 mi = 1.609 km; 1.000 km = 0.621 mi: Incomplete access; Route transition
