= Congressman Andres Acop Cosalan Road =

Road in the Philippines

Cong. Andres Acop Cosalan Road
- Gurel–Bokod–Kabayan–Buguias–Abatan Road
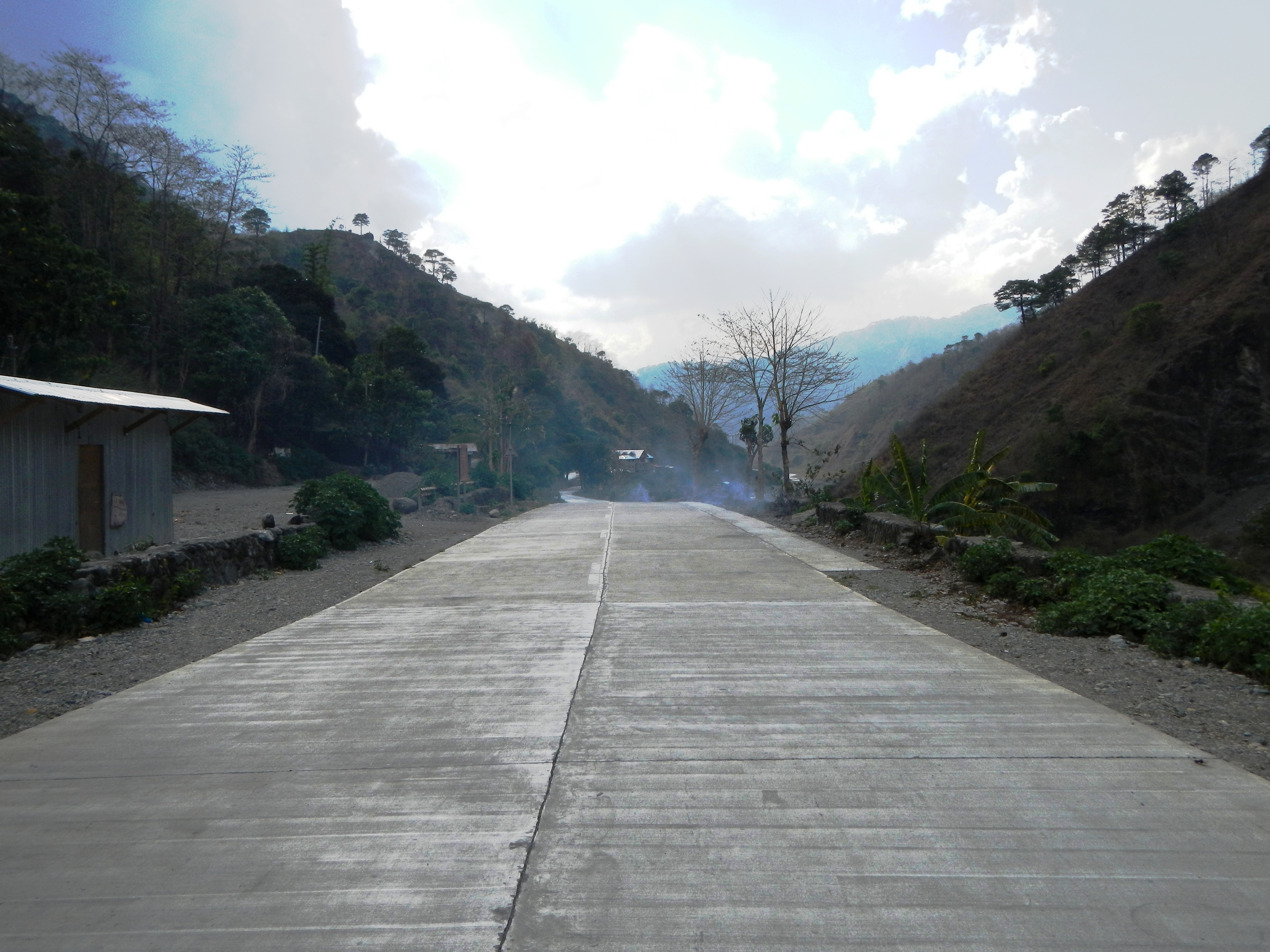
- Cong. Cosalan Road looking towards Gurel Junction near Bolo Bridge in Bokod, Benguet.

Route information
- Maintained by the Department of Public Works and Highways
- Length: 64.77 km (40.25 mi)

Major junctions
- South end: N110 (Benguet–Nueva Vizcaya Road) in Bokod
- Kiangan–Tinoc–Buguias Road in Buguias
- North end: N204 (Halsema Highway) / Cervantes–Mankayan–Abatan Road in Buguias and Mankayan

Location
- Country: Philippines
- Provinces: Benguet
- Towns: Bokod; Kabayan; Buguias

Highway system
- Roads in the Philippines; Highways; Expressways; List
← N206	→ N208

Congressman Andres Acop Cosalan Road, signed as National Route 207 (N207), is a 64.77-kilometer (40.25 mi), two-lane, secondary national road that forms part of the Philippine highway network.

== History ==
Previously called the Gurel–Bokod–Kabayan–Buguias–Abatan Road, the road's current name honors the former Representative of Baguio and Benguet Andres Cosalan who served for two terms from 1965 to 1973 and again from 1978 to 1984. Cosalan was instrumental in the development of Benguet and Baguio, and was mostly known for co-authoring Republic Act 4695 in 1966 that would divide the old Mountain Province to four different provinces, namely, Kalinga–Apayao (which was further split in 1995), Benguet, Ifugao, and Mountain Province. The road was changed to its present name upon the passing of Republic Act No. 11061 in January 16, 2017.

== Route description ==
Cong. Cosalan Road starts at the junction with Benguet–Nueva Vizcaya Road at Sitio Gurel in at the southern tip of Bokod town proper. It continues to weave through mountainous and landslide-prone terrain towards Sitio Ambangeg, which harbors the a beginner-friendly hiking route going up to Mount Pulag. From there, it continues upwards the Upper Agno River Basin through more zigzag roads towards the municipality of Kabayan where it runs alongside the mainstem of the Agno River towards the Akiki Trail Jump-off Point, and towards the municipal center of Kabayan, into Kabayan Barrio which serves as a backroad towards Halsema Highway. The road then continues to zigzag its way upwards and crossing several tributaries until it reaches the municipality of Buguias, where it crosses the main river once more to reach the Halsema Highway junction at the border of Mankayan and Buguias.

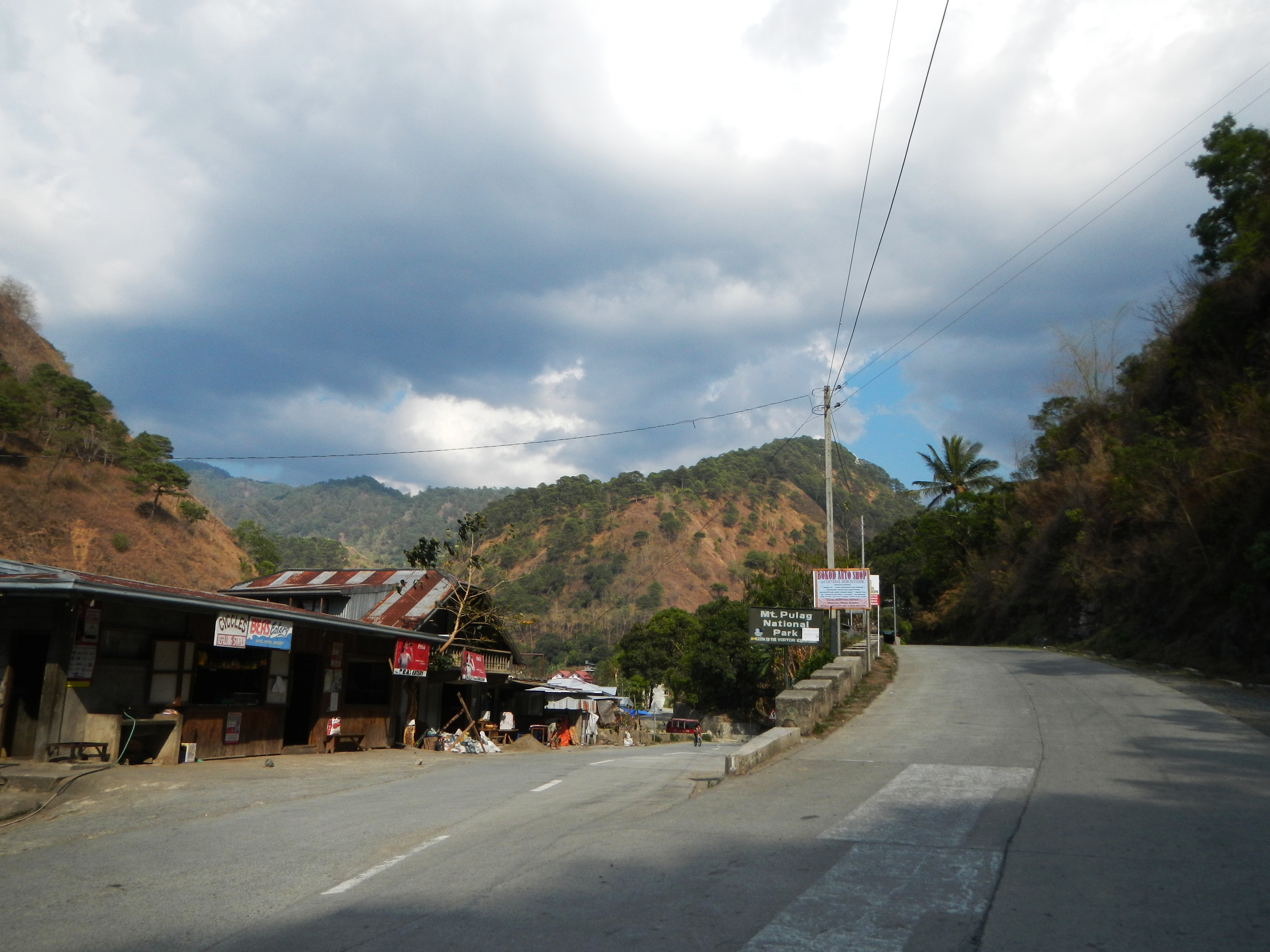
Gurel Junction, southern terminus of Cong. Cosalan Road.

== Intersections ==
The entire route is located in Benguet. Intersections are numbered by kilometer posts, with Rizal Park in Manila designated as kilometer zero.

City/Municipality	km	mi	Destinations	Notes
Bokod			N110 (Benguet–Nueva Vizcaya Road) – La Trinidad, Baguio, Aritao, Kayapa	Gurel Junction. Southern terminus. Westward to La Trinidad and Baguio, Southeast-ward to Nueva Vizcaya.
Bokod			Ambayek Access Road	Access to Sitio Ambayek in Bokod town proper.
Bokod			Poblacion–Karao–Ekip Access Road	Access to Brgy. Karao and Ekip, which harbors a trail to Mount Purgatory.
Bokod			Keweng–DMDH Road	Access to Dennis Molintas District Hospital.
Bokod	307.575	191.118	Daclan–Kamanggaan–Tickey–Bonagan Provincial Road	
Bokod	308.573	191.738	Ambangeg–Palansa–Babalak Road — Mount Pulag	Access to Mount Pulag National Park via the Ambangeg Trail.
Bokod	311.970	193.849	Binado–Kiweng Provincial Road; Palansa–Aponan–Acnip Provincial Road	
Kabayan			NRJ–Kaling–Lebeng–Babadak Road	
Kabayan			Balang–Bocao Farm-to-Market Road	
Kabayan			Cotcot Barangay Road	
Kabayan			National Museum Road	Access to Kabayan National Museum.
Kabayan	335.566	208.511	NRJ–Diboong–Bangao Provincial Road	
Kabayan			Mongoto–Kabayan Road — Atok, Buguias	Access to Timbac Mummy Caves and alternate access to N204 (Halsema Highway).
Kabayan			Tinoc–Tawangan–Bulalacao–Ballay Road — Tinoc	Access to the Four Lakes Trail, Mt. Tabayoc and to Mount Pulag via the Tawangan Trail.
Buguias			Kiangan–Tinoc–Buguias Road — Tinoc, Hungduan, Lagawe, Kiangan	Heads east towards Ifugao province. Access to Banaue via Hungduan.
Buguias			Bad-ayan–Cayapas Provincial Road	
Buguias			Bad-ayan–Pugo–Lam-ayan Road	
Buguias			Buyacaoan Barangay Road	
Buguias			NRJ–Loo–Lanas–Pan-ayaoan–Balaan Road	Access to Benguet State University Buguias campus.
Buguias – Mankayan boundary			N204 (Halsema Highway) / Cervantes–Mankayan–Abatan Road – Mankayan, Atok, Bontoc, Sabangan	Northern terminus.
1.000 mi = 1.609 km; 1.000 km = 0.621 mi
