= Halsema Highway =

Road in Luzon, Philippines

Coordinates: 16°34′30″N 120°44′11″E

Halsema Highway
- Benguet–Mountain Province Road; Baguio–Bontoc Road; Mountain Trail
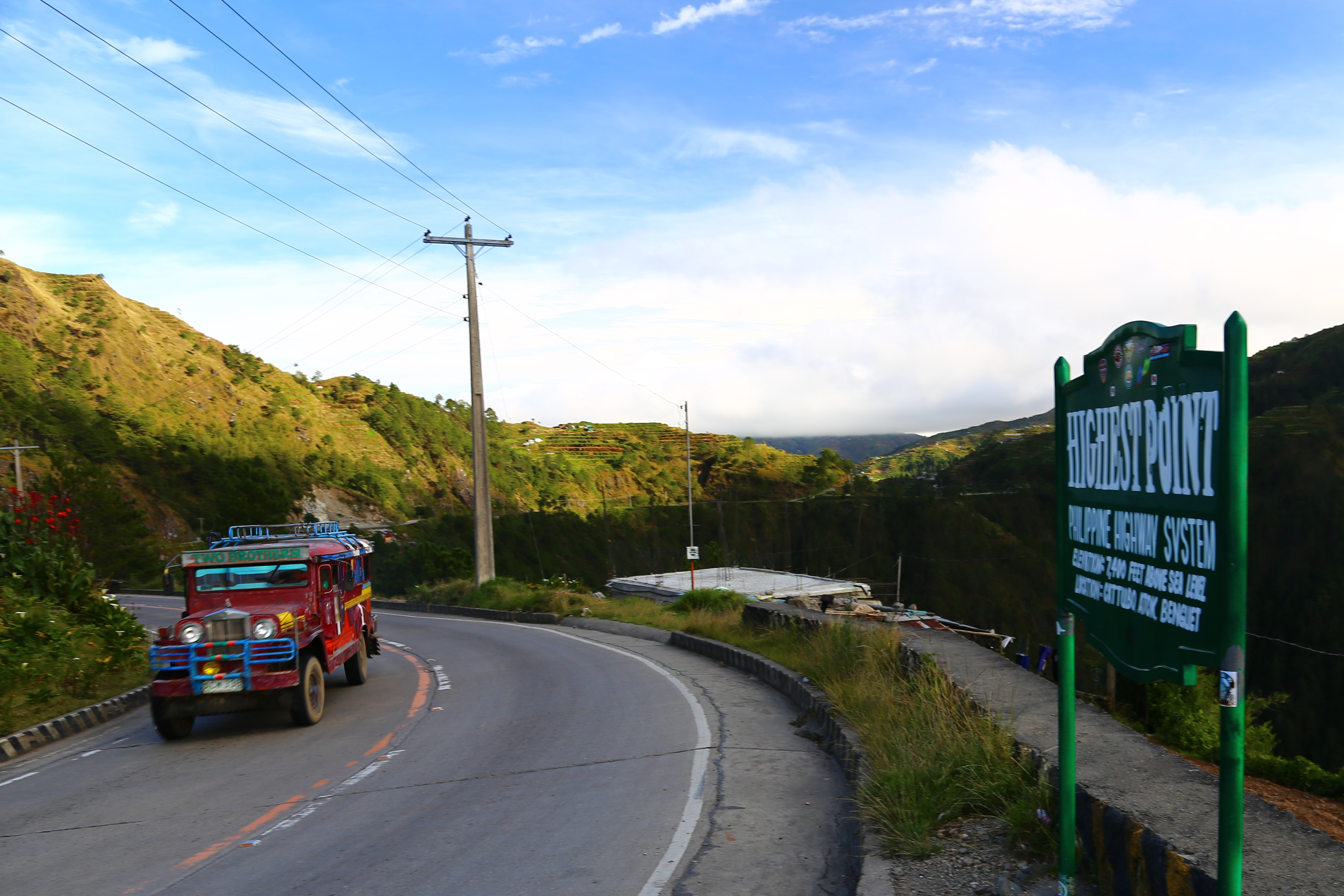
- Highest point marker in Atok, Benguet

Route information
- Length: 150 km (93 mi)
- Existed: 1930–present
- Component highways: N204

Major junctions
- North end: N204 (Bontoc–Tabuk Road) / N109 (Bontoc–Banaue Road) in Bontoc, Mountain Province
- N206 (Rev. John A. Staunton Road) in Bontoc, Mountain Province; N205 (Tagudin–Cervantes–Sabangan Road) in Sabangan, Mountain Province; N207 (Gurel–Bokod–Kabayan–Buguias–Abatan Road) in Buguias, Benguet
- South end: Magsaysay Avenue in Baguio

Location
- Country: Philippines
- Provinces: Benguet; Ifugao; Mountain Province
- Major cities: Baguio
- Towns: Atok; Bakun; Bauko; Bokod; Bontoc; Buguias; Hungduan; Kabayan; La Trinidad; Mankayan; Sabangan; Sagada; Tublay

Highway system
- Roads in the Philippines; Highways; Expressways; List

The Halsema Highway (also known as the Benguet–Mountain Province Road, the Baguio–Bontoc Road, and the Mountain Trail) is a national secondary highway in the Philippines. Situated within the Cordillera Central range in northern Luzon, it stretches from the city limit of Baguio to the municipality of Bontoc. Its highest point is at 2,255.52 metres (7,400.0 ft) above sea level in the municipality of Atok. It was officially recognized as the highest altitude highway in the Philippines until 2019, when the 2,429 metres (7,969 ft) high point Kiangan–Tinoc–Buguias Road in Tinoc, Ifugao, was recognized as the new holder of the distinction.

The 150-kilometer (93.2 mi) highway covers 95 kilometers (59 mi) of Benguet province and traverses eight of its municipalities (La Trinidad, Tublay, Atok, Bokod, Kabayan, Buguias, Bakun, and Mankayan). It also covers four Mountain Province towns (Bauko, Sabangan, Bontoc, and Sagada). The road splits into two upon reaching the village of Dantay, in Bontoc. One road leads to downtown Bontoc, while the other leads to the town of Sagada, 29 kilometers (18.0 mi) farther from the junction.

The highway forms part of National Route 204 (N204) of the Philippine highway network.

== History ==
The highway was named after an American engineer, named Eusebius Julius Halsema, who served as the mayor of Baguio from 1920 to 1937. Under Halsema's term, its construction commenced in 1922 with the help of locals and was completed in 1930 as a foot trail.

Halsema Highway has been a crucial part of Cordillera's history and transportation. It's the only existing link between Baguio and Cordillera's most remote areas. It is the only route that vegetable farmers take to distribute vegetables in Baguio's markets.

== Hazards ==
Parts of the highway are dangerous, especially during the rainy season, when landslides are common and asphalted portions become slippery.

In March 2013, List25 included the highway at #9 in its 25 Most Dangerous Roads in the World.

It was shown in Discovery World's show, Hot Roads - World's Most Dangerous Roads.

== See also ==
- Halsema Highroad Point
