= Tagudin–Cervantes–Sabangan Road =

Road in the Philippines

Tagudin–Cervantes–Sabangan Road
- Mountain Province–Ilocos Sur Road

Route information
- Maintained by Department of Public Works and Highways
- Length: 98 km (61 mi)
- Component highways: N205

Major junctions
- East end: N204 (Halsema Highway) in Sabangan, Mountain Province
- Cervantes–Mankayan–Abatan Road / Cervantes–Quirino Road in Cervantes, Ilocos Sur
- West end: N2 (Manila North Road) in Tagudin, Ilocos Sur

Location
- Country: Philippines
- Provinces: Mountain Province, Ilocos Sur
- Towns: Sabangan, Bauko, Tadian, Cervantes, Suyo, Tagudin

Highway system
- Roads in the Philippines; Highways; Expressways; List
← N204	→ N206

Tagudin–Cervantes–Sabangan Road (also known as Mountain Province–Ilocos Sur Road or Bessang Pass), signed as National Route 205 (N205) of the Philippine highway network, is a 98-kilometer (61 mi) national secondary road in the Philippines that connects between the provinces of Ilocos Sur and Mountain Province.

== Route description ==
The road starts at the junction of Halsema Highway as its eastern terminus. It passes throughout the remaining towns in Mountain Province before entering to the Ilocos Sur province. Its characteristics have numerous hairpin curves, turnpins and steep portions (particularly in Cervantes) along the mountainous route within the Cordillera mountains. Along the way, it provides an access to the Bessang Pass Natural Monument, which is located at the highest elevation of the road before going to the lowlands of the province. The road ends at the junction of Manila North Road in Tagudin.

From the World War II memorial marker in Tagudin, the road traverses Suyo and Cervantes in Ilocos Sur. Another road was in junction with the road, that leads to Mankayan and Buguias in Benguet. The road continues to Sabangan, where Halsema Highway is.

== Intersections ==
Intersections are numbered by kilometer posts, with Rizal Park in Manila designated as kilometer zero.

Province	City/Municipality	km	mi	Destinations	Notes
Ilocos Sur	Tagudin			N2 (Manila North Road) – Manila, Laoag, Vigan, Candon	Western terminus at Bitalag junction. Northbound goes to Laoag, Candon and Vigan; southbound goes to La Union, Pangasinan & Manila.
Ilocos Sur	Tagudin			Tagudin Bypass Road	Under construction, bypasses Tagudin town proper.
Ilocos Sur	Tagudin			Lubnac–Garitan–Bario-an Road	Alternate access to N2 (Manila North Road).
Ilocos Sur	Suyo			Suyo–Sigay–Del Pilar Road — Sigay, Gregorio Del Pilar, Salcedo	
Ilocos Sur	Suyo			Alilem–Batbato–Suyo Road — Alilem	
Ilocos Sur	Suyo – Cervantes boundary			Dinwede West Barangay Road	
Ilocos Sur	Cervantes			Biwak Malaya Farm-to-Market Road	Beside the Bessang Pass Natural Monument.
Ilocos Sur	Cervantes			Lamagan Road	
Ilocos Sur	Cervantes			Cervantes–Mankayan–Abatan Road / Cervantes–Quirino Road — Quirino, Mankayan, Buguias	Northbound goes to Quirino in Ilocos Sur; southbound goes to Mankayan and Buguias in Benguet.
Ilocos Sur	Cervantes			Mt. Province–Ilocos Sur Road (via Kayan)	Western end at Brgy. Aluling. Alternate route towards Tadian via Barangay Kayan East & West. N205 alignment follows the southern road via Barangay Tue.
Mountain Province	Tadian			Mt. Province–Ilocos Sur Road (via Kayan) — Besao	Eastern end at Brgy. Cabunagan.
Mountain Province	Bauko			Abatan–Mabaay Road — Sabangan, Mankayan, Buguias	Abatan Junction.
Mountain Province	Bauko			Abatan–Bagnen Road	Goes to Brgy. Bagnen.
Mountain Province	Bauko			Guinzadan–Banao–Andanum Road	
Mountain Province	Bauko			Otucan Diversion Road	Goes to Purok Kalimbatawa. Loops back to highway.
Mountain Province	Bauko			Bila–Otucan Road	Goes to Brgy. Bila & Otucan Norte. Loops back to highway.
Mountain Province	Sabangan			Bagnen–Sabangan Road — Bauko	Goes to Brgy. Bagnen Proper & Bagnen Oriente in Bauko.
Mountain Province	Sabangan			N204 (Halsema Highway) – Bontoc, Sagada, La Trinidad, Baguio	Nacagang Junction. Route terminus. Northeast-ward goes to Sagada, Bontoc & Tabuk; southwest-ward goes to Atok, La Trinidad, and Baguio.
1.000 mi = 1.609 km; 1.000 km = 0.621 mi: Unopened
