= N109 =

N109 may refer to:

- London Buses route N109
- Nueva Vizcaya–Ifugao–Mountain Province Road, a Philippine highway signed as N109
