= Benguet–Nueva Vizcaya Road =

Road in the Philippines

Benguet–Nueva Vizcaya Road
- Baguio–Nueva Vizcaya Road; Baguio–Aritao Road
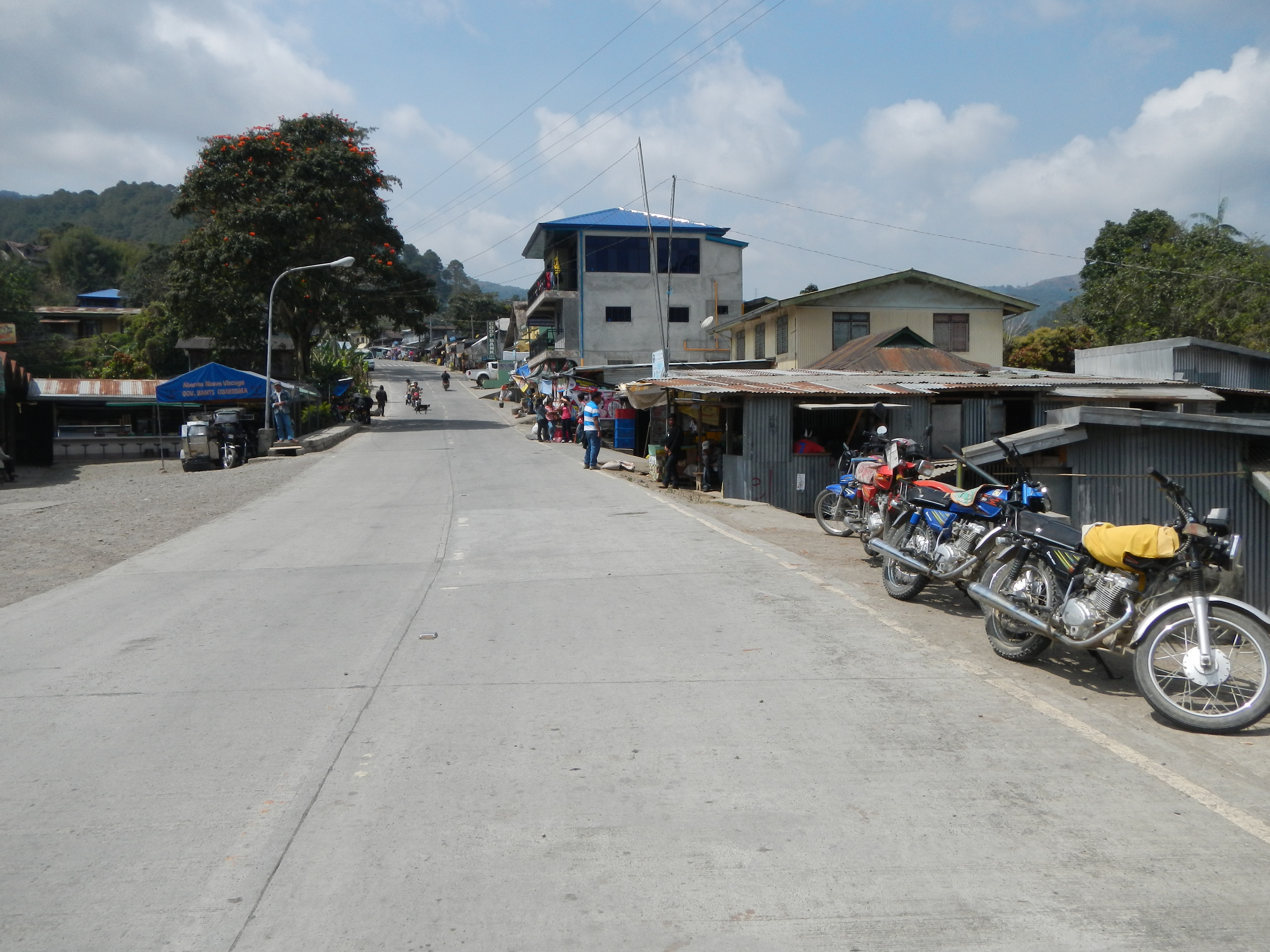
- The highway in Kayapa, Nueva Vizcaya

Route information
- Maintained by Department of Public Works and Highways
- Length: 105.67 km (65.66 mi)
- Existed: 2006–present
- Component highways: N110

Major junctions
- East end: AH 26 (N1) (Maharlika Highway) / Aritao–Quirino Road in Aritao, Nueva Vizcaya
- N207 (Cong. Andres Acop Cosalan Road) in Bokod, Benguet
- West end: N110 (Leonard Wood Road) in Baguio

Location
- Country: Philippines
- Provinces: Nueva Vizcaya, Benguet
- Major cities: Baguio
- Towns: Aritao, Kayapa, Bokod, Itogon, La Trinidad

Highway system
- Roads in the Philippines; Highways; Expressways; List
← N109	→ N111

The Benguet–Nueva Vizcaya Road, (also known as the Baguio–Aritao Road or Baguio–Nueva Vizcaya Road), is the road system that connects the provinces of Benguet and Nueva Vizcaya in the Philippines.

The entire road forms part of National Route 110 (N110) of the Philippine highway network. It traverses the municipalities of Aritao and Kayapa in Nueva Vizcaya, the municipalities of Bokod, Itogon, and La Trinidad in Benguet, and the city of Baguio.

== Route description ==
The road is one of the major access roads to the city of Baguio for travelers coming from Nueva Vizcaya and the Cagayan Valley region. Measuring 103.344 kilometers (64.215 mi), it is also longer than Asin–Nangalisan–San Pascual Road, Aspiras–Palispis Highway (formerly Marcos Highway), Kennon Road, and Naguilian Road.

The road starts at the junction with Pan-Philippine Highway and Aritao–Quirino Road in Aritao, Nueva Vizcaya. It then enters the towns of Kayapa, also in Nueva Vizcaya, and Bokod, Itogon, and La Trinidad in Benguet. It passes through Ambuklao Dam, and generally follows the Santa Cruz River (a tributary of the Magat River) in Nueva Vizcaya and the Agno River in Benguet. It then enters the city of Baguio as Pacdal Road as it traverses barangay Pacdal. It ends at Pacdal Circle, a component of Leonard Wood Road near Wright Park.

== History ==
The road was completed in September 2006. It is an upgrade from the old road, making it an all-weather path. The road cost ₱2.1 billion, and was a joint project by the Philippine government and the Japan Bank for International Cooperation.

== Intersections ==
Intersections are numbered by kilometer posts, with Rizal Park in Manila designated as kilometer zero.

Province	City/Municipality	km	mi	Destinations	Notes
Nueva Vizcaya	Aritao			N1 (Maharlika Highway) / Aritao–Quirino Road – Manila, Tuguegarao, Bayombong, Santiago	Northern terminus. Southwest-ward to Manila via Dalton Pass; Northeast-ward towards Bayombong; eastward to Quirino via Dupax.
Nueva Vizcaya	Aritao			J.P. Rizal Street	Goes to Aritao town proper.
Nueva Vizcaya	Aritao			Balete–Buyasyas–Baan Road	Access to N1 (Maharlika Highway).
Nueva Vizcaya	Kayapa			Bambang–Kayapa Road — Bambang	Passes through Salinas Natural Monument.
Nueva Vizcaya	Kayapa			Binalian–Cabanglasan Road	
Nueva Vizcaya	Kayapa			Kayapa Proper Provincial Road	
Nueva Vizcaya	Kayapa			Pangawan–Dayap–Banao–Cabayo Road	
Benguet	Bokod			Otbong–Bisal Farm-to-Market Road	
Benguet	Bokod			Bobok–Bisal Road	
Benguet	Bokod			N207 (Congressman Andres Acop Cosalan Road) – Buguias, Kabayan	Gurel Junction. Northeast-ward goes to Buguias via Kabayan. Also known as the Gurel–Bokod–Kabayan–Buguias–Abatan Road.
Benguet	Bokod			Ambuklao Dam Access Road	Provides access to Sitio Sombrero and Ambuklao Dam.
Benguet	Itogon			Binga Road	Provides access to Binga Dam & Hydroelectric Power Plant.
Benguet	Itogon			Doteng–Loacan–Antamok Municipal Road	
Benguet	Itogon			Tocmo Barangay Road	
Benguet	La Trinidad			Beckel–Balangabang Provincial Road	
Benguet	La Trinidad			Ambiong–Lamut Road / Shilan–Beckel Road — Tublay, Banaue, Sagada	Access to N204 (Halsema Highway) via Shilan–Beckel Road.
Benguet	Baguio			Tiptop Road	
Benguet	Baguio			Gibraltar Road — Mines View Park	
Benguet	Baguio			A. Regidor Street	
Benguet	Baguio			N110 (Leonard Wood Road) / Siapno Road / Ilusorio Drive / V.L. Romulo Drive / Gibraltar Road	Pacdal Circle. Route terminus. N110 continues southwest-ward as Leonard Wood Road.
1.000 mi = 1.609 km; 1.000 km = 0.621 mi: Unopened
