= Nueva Vizcaya–Ifugao–Mountain Province Road =

Highway in Luzon, Philippines

Nueva Vizcaya–Ifugao–Mountain Province Road
- Nueva Vizcaya–Mountain Province Road
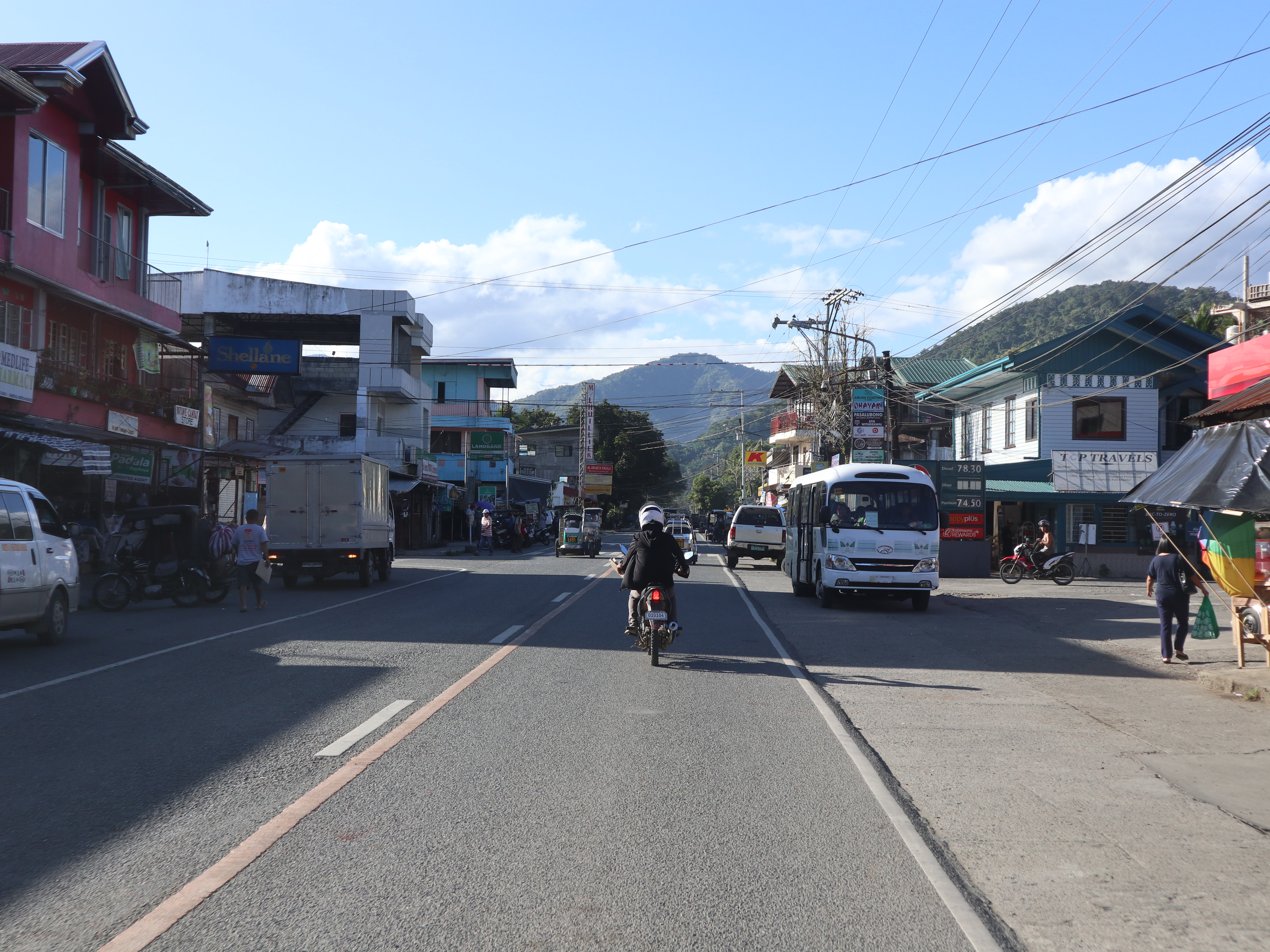
- The highway at Lagawe, Ifugao

Route information
- Maintained by Department of Public Works and Highways
- Length: 104.52 km (64.95 mi)

Major junctions
- South end: AH 26 (N1) (Pan-Philippine Highway) in Bagabag
- N224 (Banaue–Mayoyao–Alfonso Lista–Isabela Road) in Banaue
- North end: N204 (Mt. Province–Cagayan via Tabuk–Enrile Road) / Halsema Highway in Bontoc

Location
- Country: Philippines
- Provinces: Nueva Vizcaya; Ifugao; Mountain Province
- Towns: Bagabag; Lamut; Kiangan; Lagawe; Hingyon; Banaue; Hungduan; Bontoc

Highway system
- Roads in the Philippines; Highways; Expressways; List
← N108	→ N110

Nueva Vizcaya–Ifugao–Mountain Province Road or Nueva Vizcaya–Mountain Province Road signed as National Route 109 (N109) of the Philippine highway network, is a 104.52-kilometer (64.95 mi) national secondary road. It traverses and connects the municipalities of Bagabag in province of Nueva Vizcaya; Lamut, Kiangan, Lagawe, Hingyon and Banaue in the province of Ifugao. and Bontoc in the province of Mountain Province.

== Route description ==
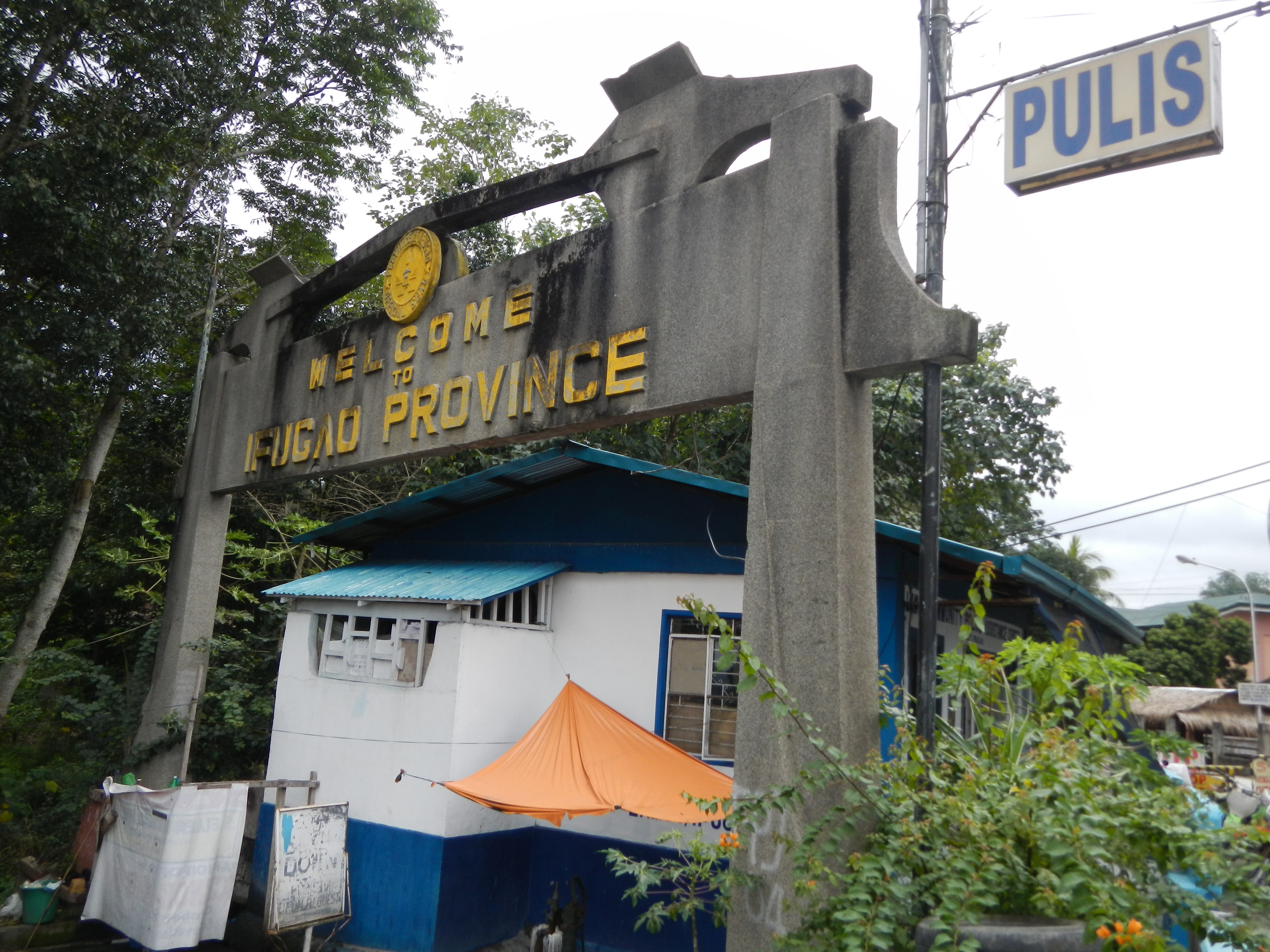
Ifugao Welcome Arch at the old highway alignment in Lamut, Ifugao.

The road starts at the junction with Pan-Philippine Highway at Bagabag in the province of Nueva Vizcaya, it continues northwards into the province of Ifugao.

The road passes through the town of Lamut, it continue northwards into Kiangan and the Ifugao province's capital Lagawe and into Banaue where it intersects with Banaue–Mayaoyao–Alfonso Lista–Isabela Road (N224) before entering Mountain Province.

It continues into the town of Bontoc before reaching its north terminus at the junction with Mountain Province–Cagayan via Tabuk–Enrile Road (N204) at the town proper of Bontoc.

== Intersections ==
Intersections are numbered by kilometer posts, with Rizal Park in Manila designated as kilometer zero.

Province	City/Municipality	km	mi	Destinations	Notes
Mountain Province	Bontoc			N204 (Mt. Province–Cagayan via Tabuk–Enrile Road) / Halsema Highway – Sagada, Baguio, Tabuk, Cagayan Valley	Bontoc Junction. Northern terminus. Southwest to Baguio and La Trinidad; northeast to Tabuk and Cagayan.
Mountain Province	Bontoc			Talubin–Caneo Road	
Mountain Province	Bontoc			Bontoc–Barlig–Natonin–Paracelis Road — Tabuk	Talubin Junction. Access to Tabuk via Barlig, Paracelis, and Natonin municipalities.
Ifugao	Hungduan			No major junctions	
Ifugao	Banaue			Gohang–San Fernando Farm-to-Market Road	
Ifugao	Banaue			Banaue Rice Terraces roadside viewpoints	
Ifugao	Banaue			Banaue–Hungduan–Benguet Boundary Road — Hungduan, Kabayan, Buguias	Meets with Buguias–Lagawe Road at the western end.
Ifugao	Banaue			N224 (Banaue–Mayoyao–Alfonso Lista–Isabela Road) – Mayoyao	Route terminates past the border with Isabela province at the town of Ramon.
Ifugao	Banaue			Amganad–Poitan Road	
Ifugao	Hingyon			Lagawe–Hingyon Provincial Road	Access to Hingyon town proper and backroad to Lagawe town proper.
Ifugao	Lagawe			Lagawe–Mungayan–Kiangan Road — Kiangan	
Ifugao	Lagawe			Lagawe–Hingyon Provincial Road / Cuta Drive	Lagawe end of road.
Ifugao	Lagawe			Buguias–Tinoc–Asipulo–Kiangan–Lagawe Road — Kiangan, Tinoc, Buguias	
Ifugao	Lamut			Lamut–Panopdopan–Holowon Road	
Ifugao	Lamut			Lamut–Sanafe–Hapid Road	
Ifugao	Lamut			Pugol–Salamague Road	
Ifugao – Nueva Vizcaya boundary	Lamut – Bagabag boundary	290.556	180.543	Lamut Bridge across Lamut River	
Nueva Vizcaya	Bagabag			Bintawan–Ibung–Pleza–Nangalisan–Paniki–Bakir Road — Villaverde, Solano	
Nueva Vizcaya	Bagabag			Saranay–Santa Lucia Road	
Nueva Vizcaya	Bagabag			Bagabag–Villaverde Road — Villaverde, Solano	
Nueva Vizcaya	Bagabag			Lantap–Santa Lucia Road	
Nueva Vizcaya	Bagabag			Bagabag Airport Road	Access to Bagabag Airport.
Nueva Vizcaya	Bagabag			Imelda Road	
Nueva Vizcaya	Bagabag			Bagabag Diversion Road	Connects to AH 26 (N1) (Maharlika Highway) at the southern end.
Nueva Vizcaya	Bagabag			Careb–Bagabag Road / Bonifacio Street	
Nueva Vizcaya	Bagabag			Elizaga Street	
Nueva Vizcaya	Bagabag			AH 26 (N1) (Maharlika Highway) – Bayombong, Manila, Santiago, Ilagan	Southern terminus. Southwest-ward to Bayombong and Manila via Dalton Pass; northeast-ward to Santiago, Ilagan and Cagayan province.
1.000 mi = 1.609 km; 1.000 km = 0.621 mi
