= Halsema Highroad Point =

Highway vantage point in Benguet, Philippines

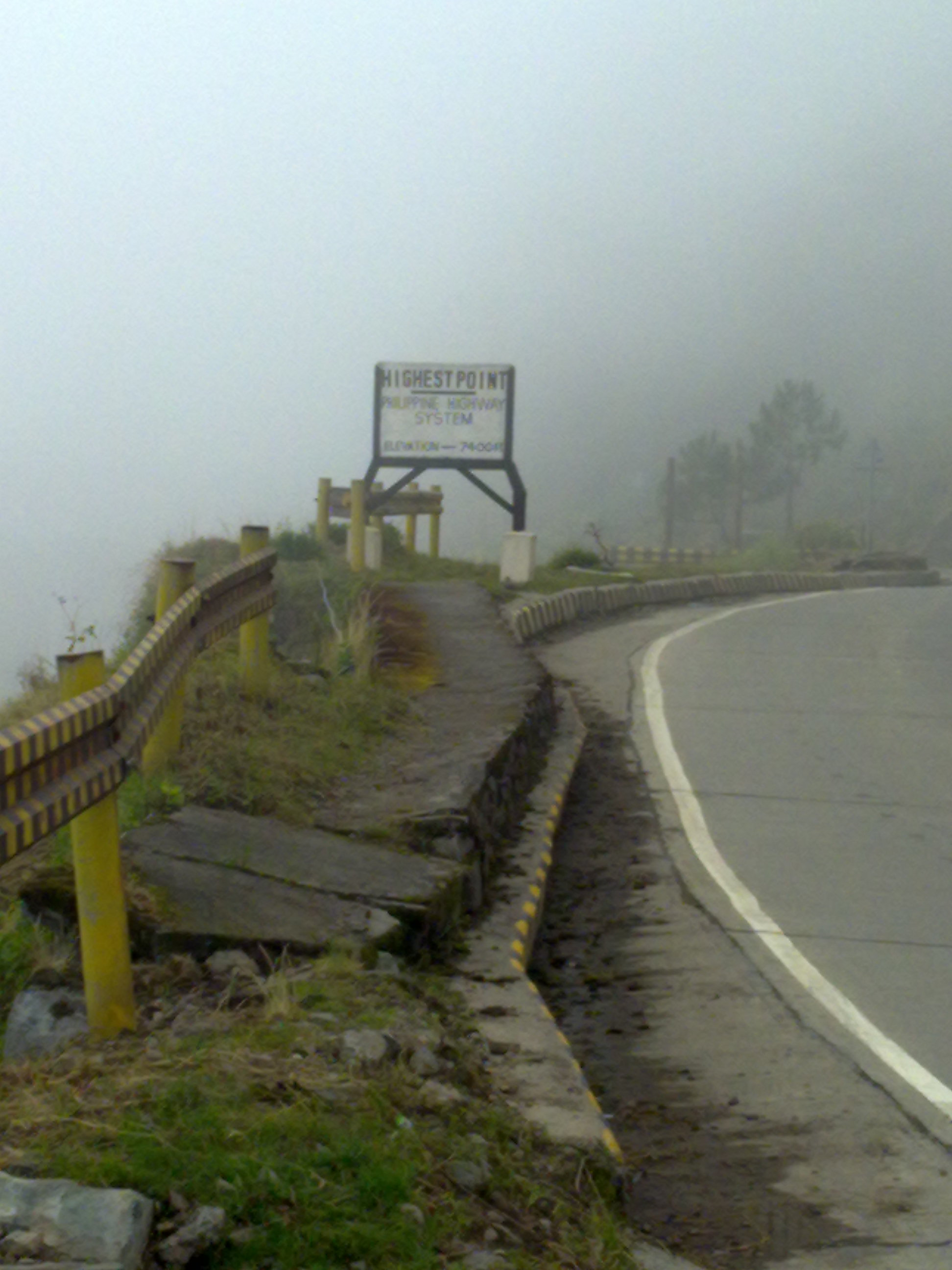
Highest point marker at the Halsema Highroad Point.

The Halsema Highroad Point (also known as the Philippine Pali) is a vantage point in Atok, Benguet, Philippines. It is situated on the Halsema Highway.

Located 2,255 m (7,398 ft) above sea level, it was formerly recognized as the location of the highest point in the Philippine Highway System until 2019 when the 2,428.66 m (7,968.0 ft) high point Kiangan-Tinoc-Buguias Road in Tinoc, Ifugao was recognized as the new holder of the distinction.

== Background ==
The Halsema Highroad Point situated in the barangays of Cattubo and Paoay in Atok, Benguet has been reputed as the highest point in the Philippine Highway System for decades until 2019. It has an elevation of 2,255 m (7,398 ft) above sea level. The point is situated at the kilometer 53 mark of Halsema Highway and has a view deck where the towns of Atok, Tublay, Bokod and Kabayan as well as Mount Pulag is visible. It is also known as Philippine Pali due to the resemblance of its vicinity to Pali of Hawaii.

The point lost its official recognition as the highest point in the Philippine Highway System on February 26, 2019 when the Department of Public Works and Highways (DPWH) announced that it has verified the claim of the local government of Tinoc, Ifugao that a portion of the Kiangan-Tinoc-Buguias Road, which was converted into a national road by Republic Act No. 10551 in May 2013, in Mount Gui’ngaw is the highest point in the country's highway system. The transportation agency conducted a survey in January 2019 and determined the point in Tinoc to have an elevation of 2,428.66 m (7,968.0 ft).
