= Bakun, Benguet =

Municipality in Benguet, Philippines

Bakun
- Municipality
- Municipality of Bakun
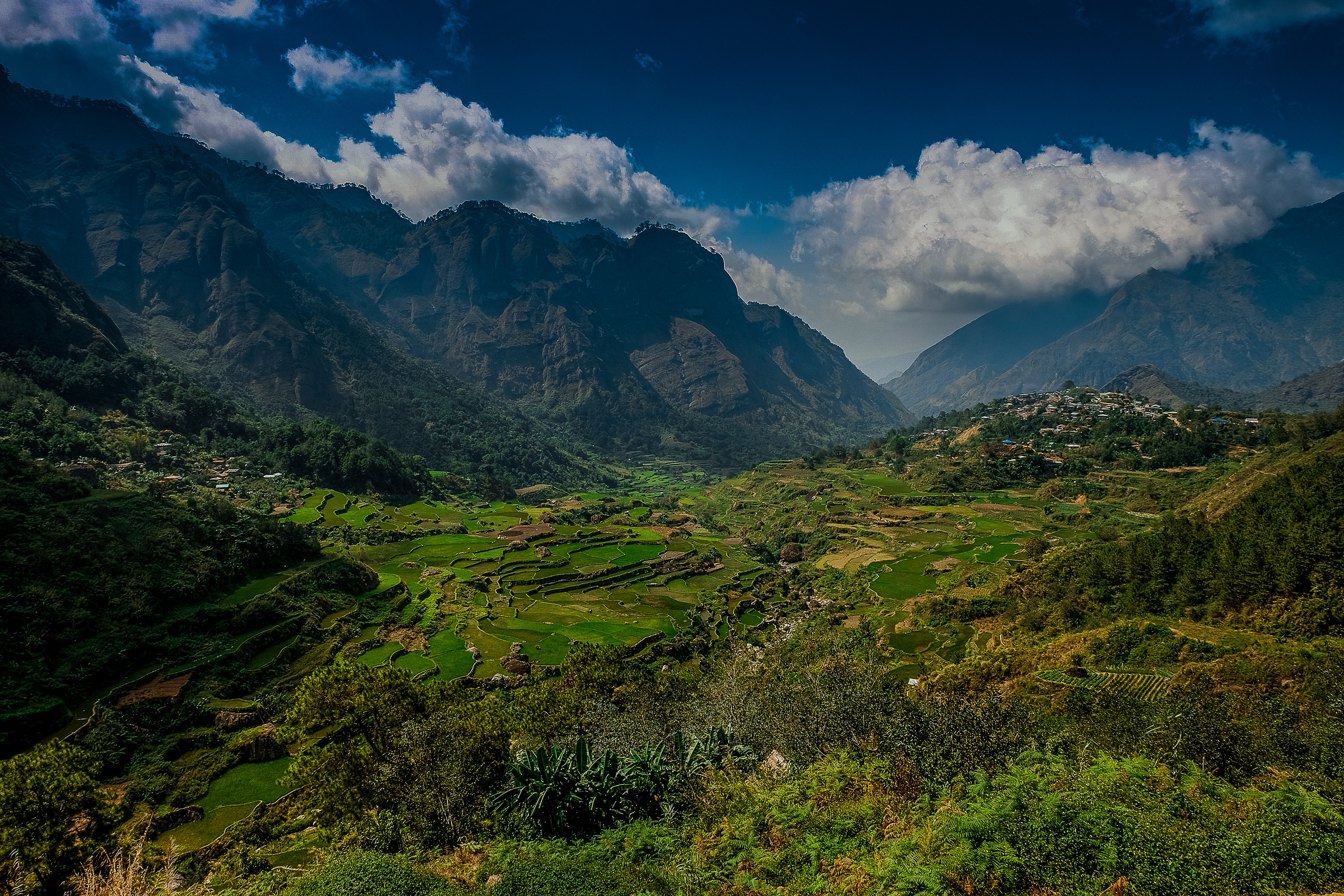
- Landscape view of Bakun

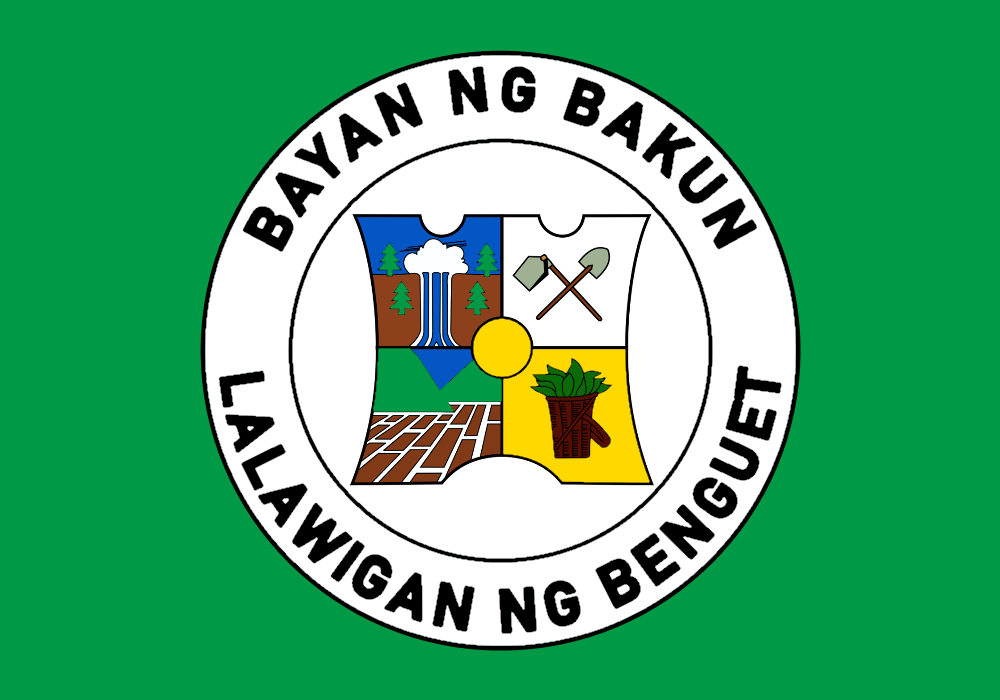
- Flag Seal
- Nickname: Home of god Kabunian
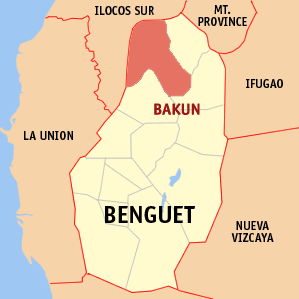
- Map of Benguet with Bakun highlighted
- Interactive map of Bakun
- Location within the Philippines
- Coordinates: 16°47′33″N 120°39′41″E
- Country: Philippines
- Region: Cordillera Administrative Region
- Province: Benguet
- District: Lone district
- Barangays: 7 (see Barangays)

Government
  - Type: Sangguniang Bayan
  - Mayor: Fausto T. Labinio
  - Vice Mayor: Marciano P. Kigisan Jr.
  - Representative: Eric G. Yap
  - Municipal Council: Members: Jesus D. Lozano; Florencia L. Balakiao; Simon G. Pablo; Edgar P. Ognaden; Dixie L. La Madrid; Jayson L. Tokias; Amando D. Camodag; Mark C. Bayawa
  - Electorate: 10,384 voters (2025)

Area
  - Total: 286.91 km^{2} (110.78 sq mi)
- Elevation: 1,466 m (4,810 ft)
- Highest elevation: 2,133 m (6,998 ft)
- Lowest elevation: 428 m (1,404 ft)

Population (2024 census)
  - Total: 15,399
  - Density: 53.672/km^{2} (139.01/sq mi)
  - Households: 3,456

Economy
  - Income class: 3rd municipal income class
  - Poverty incidence: 9.38% (2023)
  - Revenue: ₱ 166.8 million (2024)
  - Assets: ₱ 480.8 million (2024)
  - Expenditure: ₱ 137.8 million (2024)
  - Liabilities: ₱ 6.039 million (2024)

Service provider
  - Electricity: Benguet Electric Cooperative (BENECO)
- Time zone: UTC+8 (PST)
- ZIP code: 2610
- PSGC: 1401103000
- IDD : area code: +63 (0)74
- Native languages: Kankanaey; Ibaloi; Karaw; Ilocano; Tagalog
- Website: www.bakun.gov.ph

Bakun, officially the Municipality of Bakun, (Ilocano: Ili ti Bakun; Tagalog: Bayan ng Bakun), is a municipality in the province of Benguet, Philippines. According to the 2024 census, it has a population of 15,399 people.

== History ==
During the Spanish Period, Bakun was a rancheria of the Commandancia Politico-Militar de Amburayan. Ampusongan (currently a barangay of Bakun) was a rancheria of the Commandancia Politico Militar de Tiagan, Distrito de Benguet.

When the United States took control of the Philippines, the American Congress issued Act No. 48 in November 1900, placing Bakun under the province of Amburayan, and Ampusongan under the province of Benguet. On August 13, 1908, Benguet became a subprovince of the newly established Mountain Province with the enactment of Act No. 1876, and the municipal districts of Bakun and Ampusongan became part of the subprovince.

In 1917, the Bureau of Non-Christian Tribes recommended that the western border of the Mountain Province be pushed eastward, such that the entire subprovince of Amburayan and large slices of Lepanto and Benguet would be made part of Ilocos Sur and La Union. In early 1937, Ampusongan was merged with Bakun, the latter carrying the name of the township while the former became a barangay. The issuance of Republic Act No. 4695 in 1966 included Bakun as a regular municipality in the newly created province of Benguet.

== Geography ==
The Municipality of Bakun is located at 16°47′33″N 120°39′41″E, at the northwestern tip of Benguet. It is bounded by Mankayan on the east, Buguias on the southeast, Kibungan on the south, Sugpon on the south-west, Alilem on the north-west, and Cervantes on the north.

According to the Philippine Statistics Authority, the municipality has a land area of 286.91 square kilometres (110.78 sq mi) constituting 10.36% of the 2,769.08-square-kilometre- (1,069.15 sq mi) total area of Benguet.

Bakun is situated 78.55 kilometres (48.81 mi) from the provincial capital La Trinidad, and 334.33 kilometres (207.74 mi) from the country's capital city of Manila.

=== Barangays ===
Bakun is politically subdivided into 7 barangays. Each barangay consists of puroks and some have sitios.

PSGC	Barangay	Population			±% p.a.	
		2024		2010		
141103001	Ampusongan	16.4%	2,532	2,178	▴	1.04%
141103002	Bagu	4.9%	758	856	▾	−0.83%
141103004	Dalipey	16.7%	2,568	2,164	▴	1.19%
141103005	Gambang	24.6%	3,783	3,705	▴	0.14%
141103007	Kayapa	9.5%	1,468	1,527	▾	−0.27%
141103009	Poblacion (Central)	12.6%	1,946	1,834	▴	0.41%
141103010	Sinacbat	9.6%	1,480	1,323	▴	0.78%
	Total		15,399	14,535	▴	0.40%

=== Climate ===
Climate data for Bakun, Benguet
Month	Jan	Feb	Mar	Apr	May	Jun	Jul	Aug	Sep	Oct	Nov	Dec	Year
Mean daily maximum °C (°F)	24 (75)	24 (75)	25 (77)	26 (79)	25 (77)	24 (75)	25 (77)	22 (72)	23 (73)	24 (75)	24 (75)	23 (73)	24 (75)
Mean daily minimum °C (°F)	14 (57)	15 (59)	16 (61)	18 (64)	19 (66)	18 (64)	18 (64)	18 (64)	18 (64)	17 (63)	16 (61)	15 (59)	17 (62)
Average precipitation mm (inches)	42 (1.7)	48 (1.9)	74 (2.9)	110 (4.3)	269 (10.6)	275 (10.8)	362 (14.3)	325 (12.8)	330 (13.0)	306 (12.0)	126 (5.0)	61 (2.4)	2,328 (91.7)
Average rainy days	11.2	12.0	17.1	21.2	27.1	26.8	28.1	27.0	26.0	24.5	17.7	12.4	251.1
Source: Meteoblue

== Demographics ==
Population census of Bakun
Year	Pop.	±% p.a.
1903	10	—
1918	4,076	+49.28%
1939	4,383	+0.35%
1948	3,390	−2.81%
1960	4,927	+3.16%
1970	6,584	+2.94%
1975	7,932	+3.81%
1980	8,878	+2.28%
1990	10,817	+2.00%
1995	12,836	+3.26%
2000	12,213	−1.06%
2007	12,137	−0.09%
2010	13,587	+4.19%
2015	15,357	+2.36%
2020	14,535	−1.15%
2024	15,399	+1.40%
Source: Philippine Statistics Authority

In the 2024 census, Bakun had a population of 15,399 people. The population density was 54 inhabitants per square kilometre (140/sq mi).

== Economy ==
Poverty incidence of Bakun (%)

Source: Philippine Statistics Authority

Bakun's economy engages in agricultural crops such as cabbage, carrots, potatoes, and rice. Bakun is scaling up its production of high-grade Arabica coffee.

In the mining and energy sector, Bakun takes place on gold panning, mineral resource evaluations, and renewable energy installations.

Bakun is famous for its "Bakun Trio" mountains and multi-tiered waterfalls. The "Bakun Trio" mountains consist of Mt. Kabunian, Mt. Tenglawan, and Mt. Lobo. Meanwhile, the multi-tiered waterfalls of Bakun consist of Pattan, Mangta, and Tekip Falls.

== Government ==
=== Local government ===
Bakun, belonging to the lone congressional district of the province of Benguet, is governed by a mayor designated as its local chief executive and by a municipal council as its legislative body in accordance with the Local Government Code. The mayor, vice mayor, and the councilors are elected directly by the people through an election which is being held every three years.

=== Elected officials ===
Members of the Municipal Council (2025-2028)
Position	Name
Congressman	Eric G. Yap
Mayor	Fausto T. Labinio
Vice-Mayor	Marciano P. Kigisan Jr.
Councilors	Jesus D. Lozano
Councilors	Florencia L. Balakiao
Councilors	Simon G. Pablo
Councilors	Edgar P. Ognaden
Councilors	Dixie L. La Madrid
Councilors	Jayson L. Tokias
Councilors	Amando D. Camodag
Councilors	Mark C. Bayawa

== Education ==
The Bakun Schools District Office governs all educational institutions within the municipality. It oversees the management and operations of all private and public, from primary to secondary schools.

=== Public schools ===
As of 2015, Bakun has 30 public elementary schools and 4 public secondary schools.

Elementary (2014-2015)
School	Barangay
Ampusongan Elementary School	Ampusongan
Bagtangan Elementary School	Gambang
Bagu Elementary School	Bagu
Bakun Central School	Poblacion
Barbarit Primary School	Bagu
Batanes Primary School	Gambang
Bulisay Elementary School	Kayapa
Cabutotan Elementary School	Ampusongan
Cadsi-Amoy Elementary School - Main	Kayapa
Cadsi-Amoy Elementary School - Poway Annex	Kayapa
Copcopit Elementary School	Dalipey
Dalingoan Elementary School	Sinacbat
Dio-alan Primary School	Bagu
Guing-oy Primary School	Dalipey
Kayapa Elementary School	Kayapa
Ketagan-Cabatan Elementary School	Dalipey
Labinio-Acquisio Elementary School	Gambang
Labinio-Mariano Elementary School	Gambang
Lamew Elementary School	Sinacbat
Legab Elementary School	Kayapa
Nagawa Elementary School	Kayapa
Palidan Elementary School	Dalipey
Sinacbat Elementary School	Sinacbat
Talbino Elementary School	Dalipey
Tanas Elementary School	Ampusongan
Tap-ayao-Abiyang Elementary School	Poblacion
Tap-ayao-Abiyang Elementary School - Beyeng Extension	Poblacion
Tingbaoen-Galisen Elementary School	Gambang
Yugo Bantales Primary School	Gambang

Secondary (2013-2014)
School	Barangay
Ampusongan National High School	Ampusongan
Ampusongan National High School - Kayapa Extension	Kayapa
Bakun National High School	Poblacion
Bakun National High School - Sinacbat Extension	Sinacbat
