= Hungduan =

Municipality in Ifugao, Philippines

- Municipality
- Municipality of Hungduan
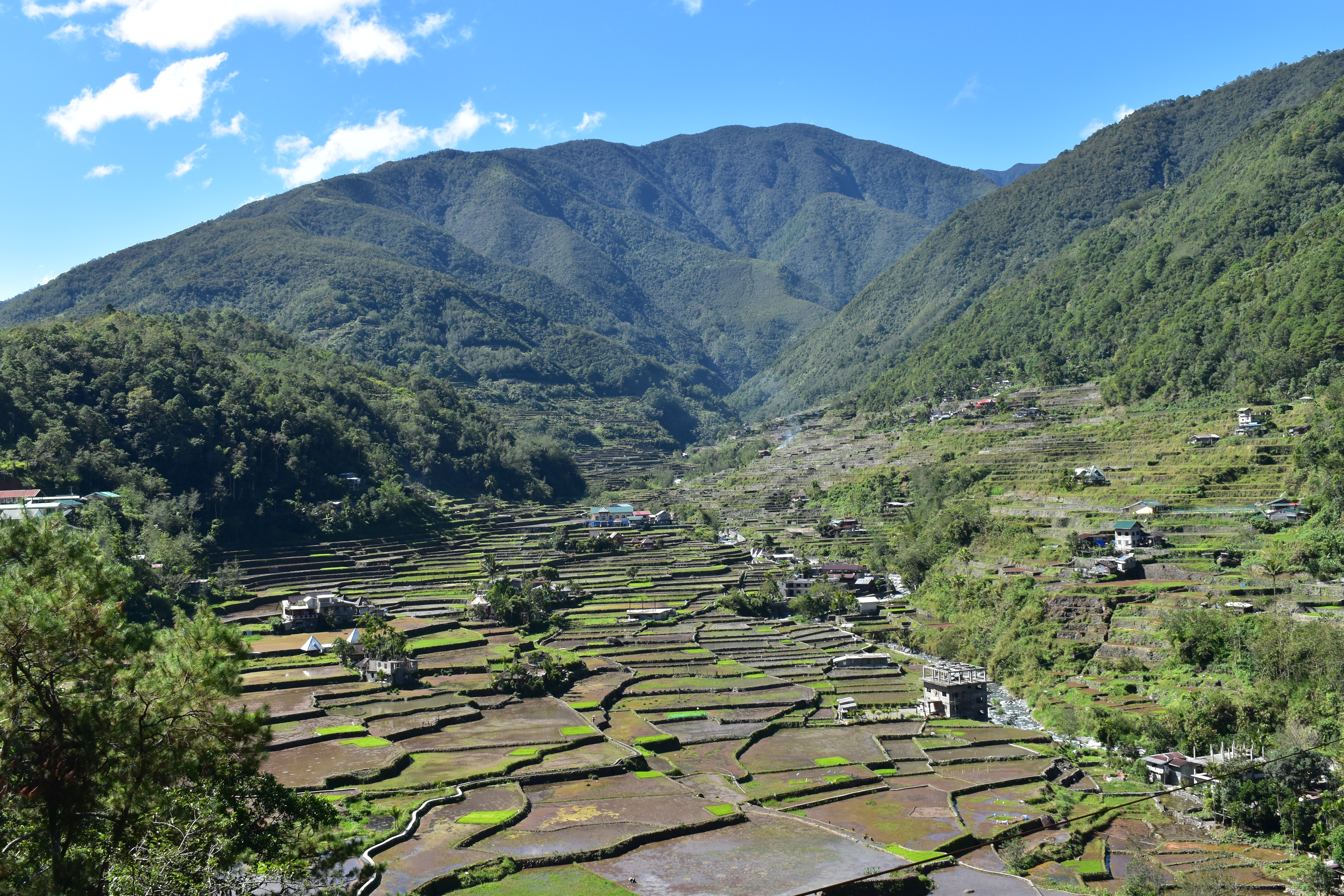
- Hapao Rice Terraces in Hungduan

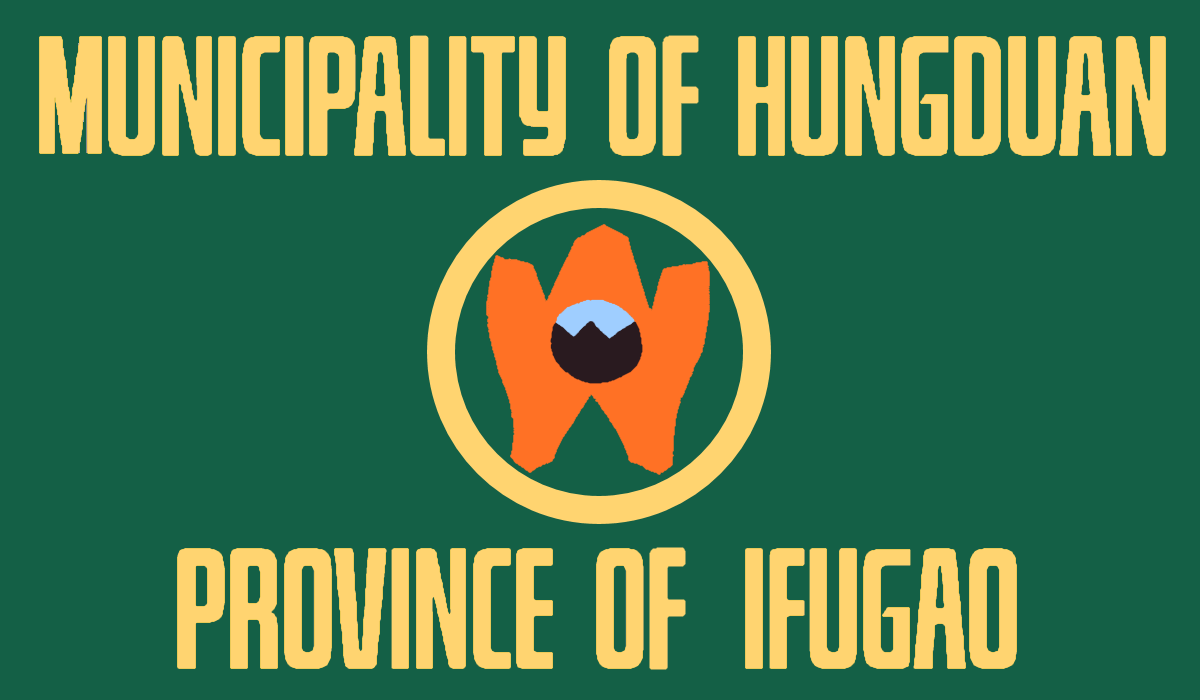
- Flag

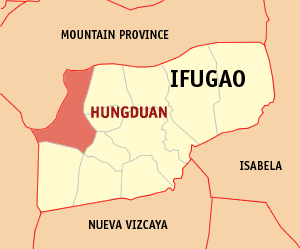
- Map of Ifugao with Hungduan highlighted
- Interactive map of Hungduan
- Location within the Philippines
- Coordinates: 16°50′N 121°00′E
- Country: Philippines
- Region: Cordillera Administrative Region
- Province: Ifugao
- District: Lone district
- Barangays: 9 (see Barangays)

Government
  - Type: Sangguniang Bayan
  - Mayor: Casan P. Dumulag
  - Vice Mayor: Romeo L. Haguyayap
  - Representative: Solomon Chungalao
  - Municipal Council: Members: Bernard A. Gaddang; Pedro I. Binwag; Jeremiah T. Ipan; Florencio B. Ognayon; John T. Bumangabang; Leonardo P. Ognayon Jr.; Evelyn Y. Balenga; Jessie B. Lacbawan
  - Electorate: 6,223 voters (2025)

Area
  - Total: 260.30 km^{2} (100.50 sq mi)
- Elevation: 1,291 m (4,236 ft)
- Highest elevation: 2,604 m (8,543 ft)
- Lowest elevation: 651 m (2,136 ft)

Population (2024 census)
  - Total: 8,970
  - Density: 34.5/km^{2} (89.3/sq mi)
  - Households: 1,983

Economy
  - Income class: 3rd municipal income class
  - Poverty incidence: 12.31% (2023)
  - Revenue: ₱ 174.6 million (2024)
  - Assets: ₱ 231.2 million (2024)
  - Expenditure: ₱ 160.4 million (2024)
  - Liabilities: ₱ 60.3 million (2024)

Service provider
  - Electricity: Ifugao Electric Cooperative (IFELCO)
- Time zone: UTC+8 (PST)
- ZIP code: 3603
- PSGC: 1402702000
- IDD : area code: +63 (0)74
- Native languages: Ifugao; Kallahan; Tuwali; Ilocano; Tagalog

Hungduan, officially the Municipality of Hungduan is a municipality in the province of Ifugao, Philippines. According to the 2024 census, it has a population of 8,970 people.

Through Presidential Proclamation 660, October 1, 2024 was declared a special non-working day for the commemoration of its 107th Founding Anniversary.

== Geography ==
The Municipality of Hungduan is bounded on the north-east by the town of Banaue in the east by Hingyon and on the southeast by the town of Kiangan. It borders in the south with the town of Tinoc, Ifugao. On its westside, the town is bordered by the towns of Sabangan and Bauko, Mountain Province.

Mount Napulawan, in Hungduan, is Ifugao's 2nd highest peak with an elevation of 2,642 meters ASL. It was Tomoyuki Yamashita's former headquarters.

Hungduan is situated 49.41 kilometres (30.70 mi) from the provincial capital Lagawe, and 400.07 kilometres (248.59 mi) from the country's capital city of Manila.

=== Barangays ===
Hungduan is politically subdivided into 9 barangays. Each barangay consists of puroks and some have sitios.

- Abatan
- Ba-ang
- Bangbang
- Bokiawan
- Hapao
- Lubo-ong
- Maggok
- Nungulunan
- Poblacion

=== Climate ===
Climate data for Hungduan, Ifugao
Month	Jan	Feb	Mar	Apr	May	Jun	Jul	Aug	Sep	Oct	Nov	Dec	Year
Mean daily maximum °C (°F)	21 (70)	22 (72)	24 (75)	25 (77)	25 (77)	25 (77)	24 (75)	24 (75)	24 (75)	24 (75)	23 (73)	21 (70)	24 (74)
Mean daily minimum °C (°F)	14 (57)	15 (59)	16 (61)	18 (64)	19 (66)	19 (66)	19 (66)	19 (66)	19 (66)	17 (63)	16 (61)	15 (59)	17 (63)
Average precipitation mm (inches)	35 (1.4)	46 (1.8)	63 (2.5)	117 (4.6)	402 (15.8)	400 (15.7)	441 (17.4)	471 (18.5)	440 (17.3)	258 (10.2)	94 (3.7)	68 (2.7)	2,835 (111.6)
Average rainy days	9.9	11.1	13.9	18.9	26.0	27.3	28.9	28.5	26.1	19.7	14.5	12.8	237.6
Source: Meteoblue

== Demographics ==
Population census of Hungduan

Year	Pop.	±% p.a.
1939	12,937	—
1948	3,540	−13.41%
1960	7,603	+6.58%
1970	8,958	+1.65%
1975	12,301	+6.57%

Year	Pop.	±% p.a.
1980	9,857	−4.33%
1990	7,254	−3.02%
1995	9,491	+5.17%
2000	9,380	−0.25%
2007	9,601	+0.32%

Year	Pop.	±% p.a.
2010	9,933	+1.24%
2015	9,400	−1.04%
2020	8,866	−1.22%
2024	8,970	+0.28%

Source: Philippine Statistics Authority

In the 2024 census, the population of Hungduan was 8,970 people, with a density of 34 inhabitants per square kilometre or 88 inhabitants per square mile.

== Economy ==
Poverty incidence of Hungduan (%)

Source: Philippine Statistics Authority

Hungduan's key economic sector is agriculture. Tinawon rice and vegetables form the main crops of Hungduan. Hungduan is home to the Hapao Rice Terraces and Mount Napulawan.

== Government ==
=== Local government ===
Hungduan, belonging to the lone congressional district of the province of Ifugao, is governed by a mayor designated as its local chief executive and by a municipal council as its legislative body in accordance with the Local Government Code. The mayor, vice mayor, and the councilors are elected directly by the people through an election which is being held every three years.

=== Elected officials ===
Members of the Municipal Council (2025–2028)
Position	Name
Congressman	Solomon R. Chungalao
Mayor	Casan B. Dumulag
Vice-Mayor	Romeo L. Haguyayap
Councilors	Bernard A. Gaddang
Councilors	Leonardo P. Ognayon Jr.
Councilors	John T. Bumangabang
Councilors	Florencio B. Ognayon
Councilors	Jeremiah T. Ipan
Councilors	Evelyn Y. Balenga
Councilors	Pedro I. Binwag
Councilors	Jessie B. Lacbawan

== Education ==
The Hungduan Schools District Office governs all educational institutions within the municipality. It oversees the management and operations of all private and public, from primary to secondary schools.

=== Primary and elementary schools ===
- Abatan Elementary School
- Am-iyong Primary School
- Awa Primary School
- Baang Elementary School
- Bangbang Elementary School
- Bokiawan Elementary School
- Hapao Elementary School
- Hungduan Central School
- Lubo-ong Elementary School
- Maggok Elementary School
- Nompolia Elementary School
- Nungulunan Elementary School
- Polod Primary School
- Tabag Primary School

=== Secondary schools ===
- Bangbang National High School
- Hungduan National High School
