= Mankayan =

Municipality in Benguet, Philippines

- Municipality
- Municipality of Mankayan
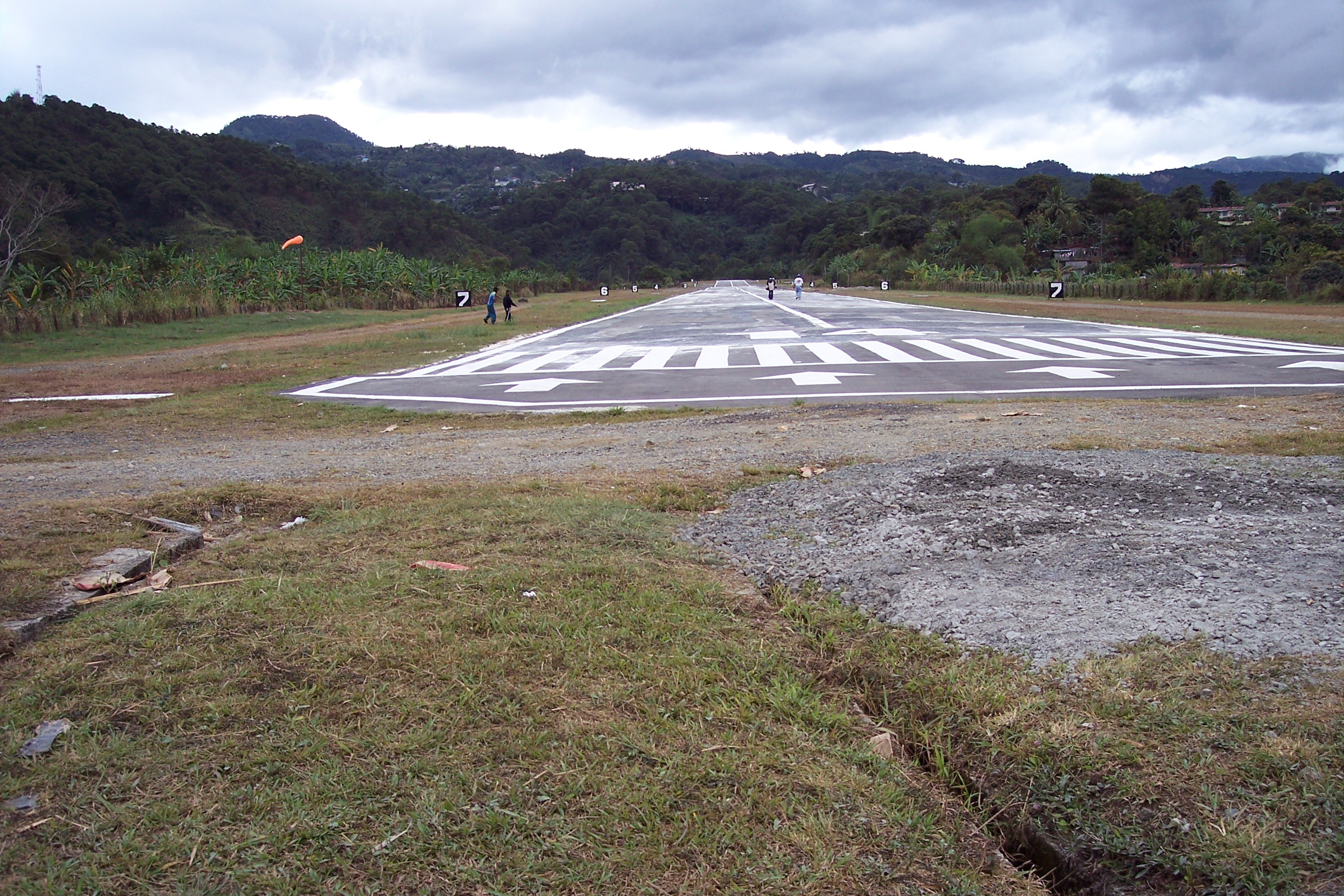
- Lepanto Mines Airstrip

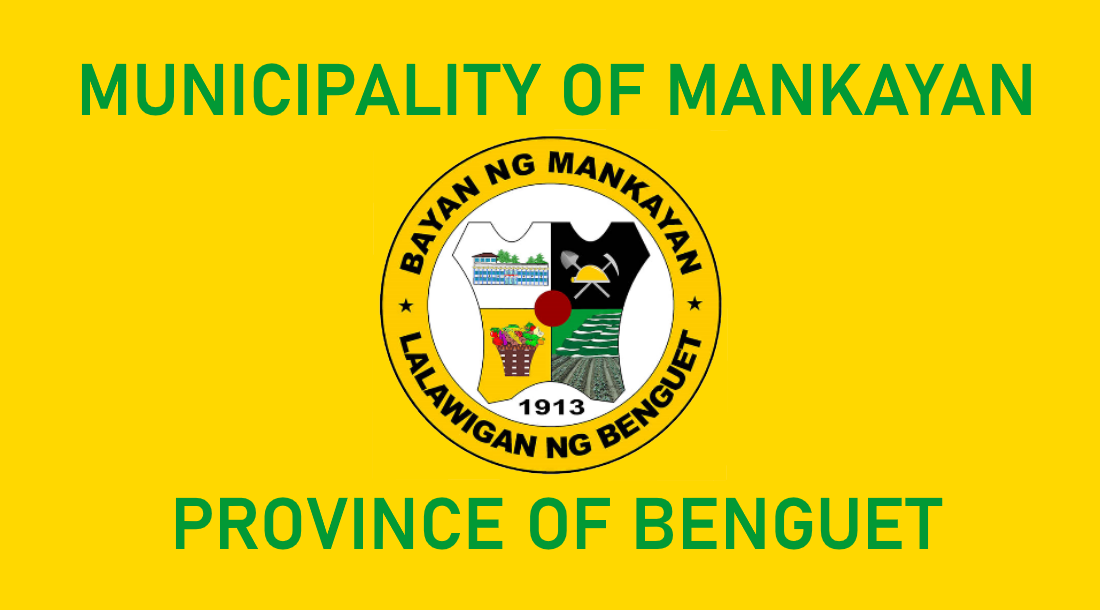
- Flag Seal
- Motto: North to the Future of Benguet
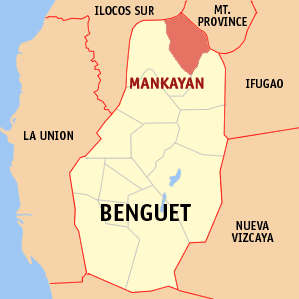
- Map of Benguet with Mankayan highlighted
- Interactive map of Mankayan
- Location within the Philippines
- Coordinates: 16°51′24″N 120°47′36″E
- Country: Philippines
- Region: Cordillera Administrative Region
- Province: Benguet
- District: Lone district
- Founded: 1955
- Barangays: 12 (see Barangays)

Government
  - Type: Sangguniang Bayan
  - Mayor: Cesar D. Pasiwen
  - Vice Mayor: Aldrin S. Camiling
  - Representative: Eric Go Yap
  - Municipal Council: Members: Jeston S. Balong-angey; Ambino T. Padawi; Dick P. Tip-ac; Alexander A. Dapiawen; Reynald K. Manuit; Camilo C. Muñoz; Pacito K. Donato; Lloyd Mattgarette B. Luspian
  - Electorate: 21,442 voters (2025)

Area
  - Total: 130.48 km^{2} (50.38 sq mi)
- Elevation: 1,338 m (4,390 ft)
- Highest elevation: 2,214 m (7,264 ft)
- Lowest elevation: 666 m (2,185 ft)

Population (2024 census)
  - Total: 38,647
  - Density: 296.19/km^{2} (767.13/sq mi)
  - Households: 9,288

Economy
  - Income class: 2nd municipal income class
  - Poverty incidence: 8.63% (2023)
  - Revenue: ₱ 237.9 million (2024)
  - Assets: ₱ 625.7 million (2024)
  - Expenditure: ₱ 182 million (2024)
  - Liabilities: ₱ 65.4 million (2024)

Service provider
  - Electricity: Benguet Electric Cooperative (BENECO)
- Time zone: UTC+8 (PST)
- ZIP code: 2608
- PSGC: 1401111000
- IDD : area code: +63 (0)74
- Native languages: Kankanaey; Ibaloi; Ilocano; Tagalog

Mankayan, officially the Municipality of Mankayan (Ilocano: Ili ti Mankayan; Tagalog: Bayan ng Mankayan), is a municipality in the province of Benguet, Philippines. According to the 2024 census, it has a population of 38,647 people.

The municipality is known as a mining town, being the location of several mines, including the Lepanto Consolidated Mining Company.

== Etymology ==
The name "Mankayan" is derived from Nancayan, the Hispanic term of the native name of the place, Nangkayang (which means "high up in the mountain").

== History ==
=== Pre-colonial period ===
Nangkayang was once a heavily forested area. The natives of the surrounding settlements of Panat and Bag-ongan mined gold through the labon system, after its reported discovery in a river. Copper was later discovered by the end of the 16th century in Kamangga-an (location of present-day Lepanto).

=== Spanish period ===
By the 1800s, the Spanish colonial government sent expeditions to survey the mines. On February 3, 1850, an expedition led by engineer Don Antonio Hernandez confirmed the presence of copper in Mankayan.

In 1852, Lepanto was established by the Spanish as a comandancia politico-militar, composed of several rancherias which included Mankayan.

Seven different mines were discovered in the Mankayan-Suyoc region during Admiral Pedro Durán de Monforte's 1667 expedition, and Simón de Anda's administration (1770–1776) mentioned Igorot copperware. In 1833, Galvey sent ore samples from Gambang ("copper"), Suyoc, and Mankayan, to the governor. The first Spanish mining claim on the Cordillera was made by Tomás Balbas y Castro on 26 March 1856, and established a mining company called the Sociedad Minero-Metalurgica Cantabro Filipino de Mancayan. The company ceased operations in 1875.

=== American period ===
Under the American rule, Mankayan remained under the jurisdiction of Lepanto, and later Lepanto-Bontoc until the latter's dissolution. Mankayan was later annexed to the sub-province of Benguet as a municipal district in 1913.

The mining boom in Mankayan began in 1933, with American Victor Lednickey establishing the Lepanto Consolidated Mining Company on September 26, 1936.

=== Second World War ===
In 1942, following the outbreak of the war, the Lepanto Consolidated Mining Company, together with the Suyoc Consolidated Mining Company, were taken over by the Japanese Mitsui Mining Company, which renamed the mines into "Mitsui Mankayan Copper Mines". The Mitsui Company controlled the mines until 1945.

=== Post-war era ===
After the war, the Lepanto Consolidated Mining Company resumed the mining operations.

Mankayan was converted from a municipal district into a regular municipality on June 16, 1955, by virtue of Republic Act 1302.

In 2018, in order to preserve the highly artistic gangsa-making intangible heritage of the Mankayan elders, the cultural masters of the town converged and began teaching the younger generations the process and importance of gangsa-making to their way of life, effectively preserving indigenous gong culture in the town.

== Geography ==
Mankayan is on the north-western tip of Benguet. It is bordered by Bakun on the west, Buguias on the southeast, Tadian and Bauko on the east, and Cervantes on the north-west.

According to the Philippine Statistics Authority, the municipality has a land area of 130.48 square kilometres (50.38 sq mi) constituting 4.71% of the 2,769.08-square-kilometre- (1,069.15 sq mi) total area of Benguet.

Mankayan is situated 87.99 kilometres (54.67 mi) from the provincial capital La Trinidad, and 340.92 kilometres (211.84 mi) from the country's capital of Manila.

=== Barangays ===
Mankayan is politically subdivided into 12 barangays. Each barangay consists of puroks and some have sitios.

PSGC	Barangay	Population			±% p.a.	
		2024		2010		
141111001	Balili	22.1%	8,547	6,236	▴	2.20%
141111002	Bedbed	2.9%	1,113	864	▴	1.76%
141111003	Bulalacao	8.7%	3,362	3,349	▴	0.03%
141111004	Cabiten	5.5%	2,128	1,854	▴	0.95%
141111005	Colalo	4.2%	1,632	1,232	▴	1.96%
141111006	Guinaoang	5.7%	2,212	1,855	▴	1.22%
141111008	Paco	12.5%	4,844	6,035	▾	−1.50%
141111009	Palasaan	7.7%	2,971	2,348	▴	1.63%
141111010	Poblacion	5.7%	2,196	3,084	▾	−2.31%
141111011	Sapid	7.4%	2,878	3,271	▾	−0.88%
141111012	Tabio	9.2%	3,566	3,792	▾	−0.42%
141111013	Taneg	4.6%	1,784	1,666	▴	0.47%
	Total		38,647	37,233	▴	0.26%

=== Climate ===
Climate data for Mankayan, Benguet
Month	Jan	Feb	Mar	Apr	May	Jun	Jul	Aug	Sep	Oct	Nov	Dec	Year
Mean daily maximum °C (°F)	20 (68)	22 (72)	23 (73)	25 (77)	24 (75)	24 (75)	23 (73)	23 (73)	23 (73)	23 (73)	22 (72)	21 (70)	23 (73)
Mean daily minimum °C (°F)	13 (55)	14 (57)	15 (59)	17 (63)	18 (64)	18 (64)	18 (64)	18 (64)	18 (64)	17 (63)	16 (61)	15 (59)	16 (61)
Average precipitation mm (inches)	35 (1.4)	46 (1.8)	63 (2.5)	117 (4.6)	402 (15.8)	400 (15.7)	441 (17.4)	471 (18.5)	440 (17.3)	258 (10.2)	94 (3.7)	68 (2.7)	2,835 (111.6)
Average rainy days	9.9	11.1	13.9	18.9	26.0	27.3	28.9	28.5	26.1	19.7	14.5	12.8	237.6
Source: Meteoblue

== Demographics ==
Population census of Mankayan
Year	Pop.	±% p.a.
1903	118	—
1918	2,977	+24.01%
1939	6,865	+4.06%
1948	5,742	−1.97%
1960	13,812	+7.59%
1970	21,780	+4.65%
1975	24,123	+2.07%
1980	25,684	+1.26%
1990	32,889	+2.50%
1995	34,699	+1.01%
2000	34,502	−0.12%
2007	34,563	+0.02%
2010	35,586	+1.07%
2015	35,953	+0.20%
2020	37,233	+0.74%
2024	38,647	+0.90%
Source: Philippine Statistics Authority

In the 2024 census, Mankayan had a population of 38,647 people. The population density was 300 inhabitants per square kilometre (780/sq mi).

== Economy ==
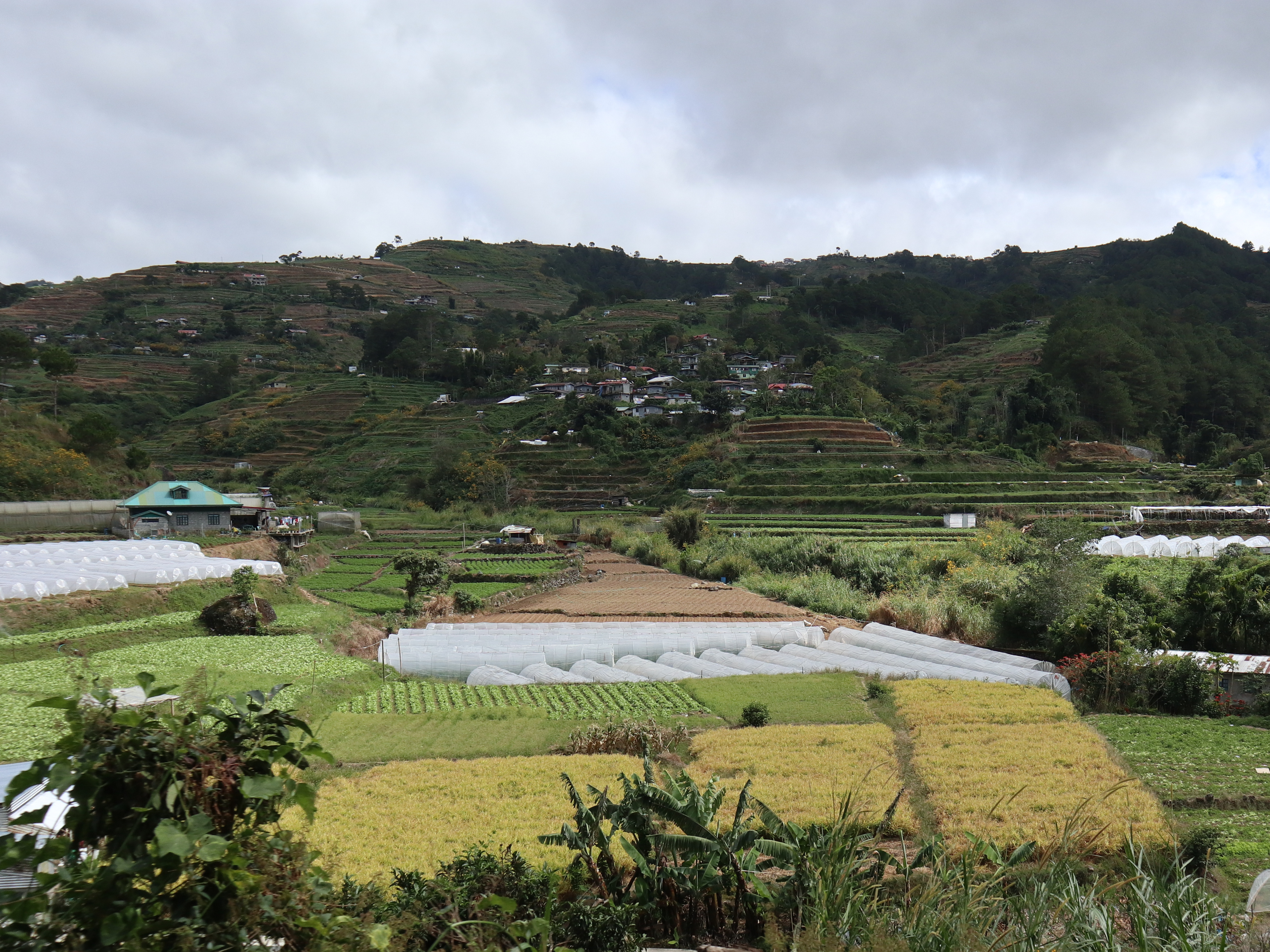
Mankayan vegetable terraces

Poverty incidence of Mankayan (%)

Source: Philippine Statistics Authority

Mankayan's economy is anchored heavily on mining and agriculture. Mining serves as the primary source of economy in Mankayan. Mankayan's agriculture involves vegetable production such as cabbages, potatoes, and carrots.

== Government ==
=== Local government ===
Mankayan, belonging to the lone congressional district of the province of Benguet, is governed by a mayor designated as its local chief executive and by a municipal council as its legislative body in accordance with the Local Government Code. The mayor, vice mayor, and the councilors are elected directly by the people through an election which is being held every three years.

=== Elected officials ===
Members of the Municipal Council (2025-2028)
Position	Name
Congressman	Eric Go Yap
Mayor	Cesar D. Pasiwen
Vice-Mayor	Aldrin S. Camiling
Councilors	Jeston S. Balong-angey
Councilors	Ambino T. Padawi
Councilors	Dick P. Tip-ac
Councilors	Alexander A. Dapiawen
Councilors	Reynald K. Manuit
Councilors	Camilo C. Muñoz
Councilors	Pacito K. Donato
Councilors	Lloyd Mattgarette B. Luspian

== Education ==
The Mankayan Schools District Office governs all educational institutions within the municipality. It oversees the management and operations of all private and public, from primary to secondary schools.

=== Public schools ===
As of 2014, Mankayan has 35 public elementary schools and 9 public secondary schools.

Elementary (2013–2014)
School	Barangay
Am-am Elementary School	Balili
Ampuntoc Primary School	Colalo
Ayosep Primary School	Balili
Baguyos Primary School	Colalo
Balili Elementary School	Balili
Bato Primary School	Tabio
Bedbed Elementary School	Bedbed
Bulalacao Elementary School	Bulalacao
Ca-ew Elementary School	Bulalacao
Cabacab Elementary School	Balili
Cabitin Elementary School	Cabiten
Cada Primary School	Balili
Camanpaguey Elementary School	Cabiten
Colalo Elementary School	Colalo
Cotcot Primary School	(Cotcot)
Guinaoang Elementary School	Guinaoang
Guiweng Primary School	Tabio
Kema Primary School	Tabio
Lap-angan Primary School	(Lap-angan)
Las-igan Elementary School	Cabiten
Lepanto Elementary School	Paco
Mankayan Central School	Poblacion
Mantiyeng Primary School	Cabiten
Marivic Elementary School	Sapid
Mogao Elementary School	Balili
Pacda Primary School	Palasaan
Paco Elementary School	Paco
Palatong Elementary School	Tabio
Payeo Primary School	Bedbed
Sapid Elementary School	Sapid
Sayapot Primary School	Balili
Suyoc Elementary School	Taneg
Taneg Elementary School	Taneg
Taneg Primary School	Taneg
Ulsino Primary School	--

Secondary (2013–2014)
School	Barangay
Balili National High School	Balili
Balili National High School - Cabacab Annex	Balili
Bedbed National High School	Bedbed
Bulalacao National High School	Bulalacao
Cabiten National High School	Cabiten
Guinaoang National High School	Guinaoang
Lepanto National High School	Paco
Palatong National High School	Tabio
Mankayan National High School	Poblacion
