= Sabangan =

Municipality in Mountain Province, Philippines

- Municipality
- Municipality of Sabangan
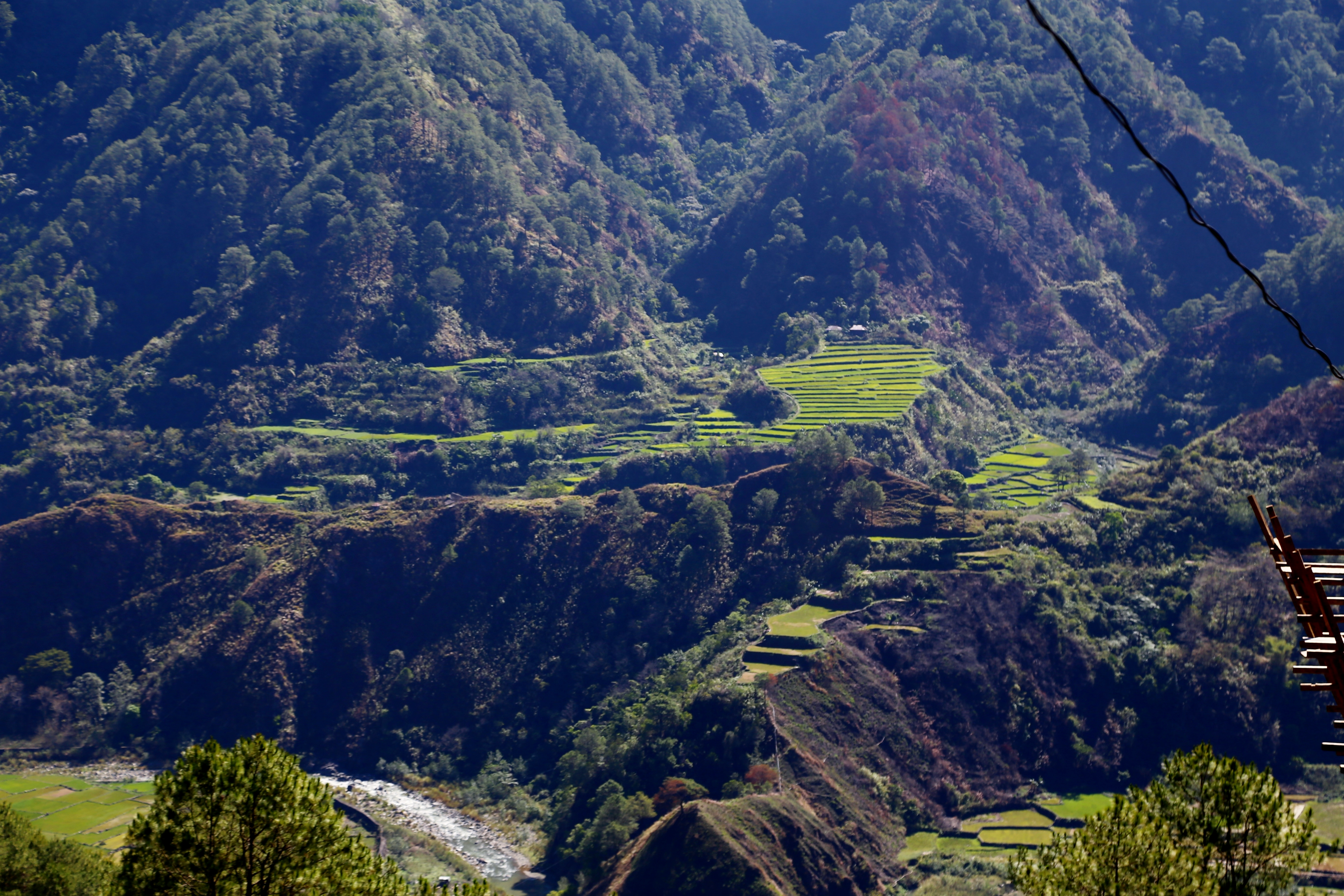

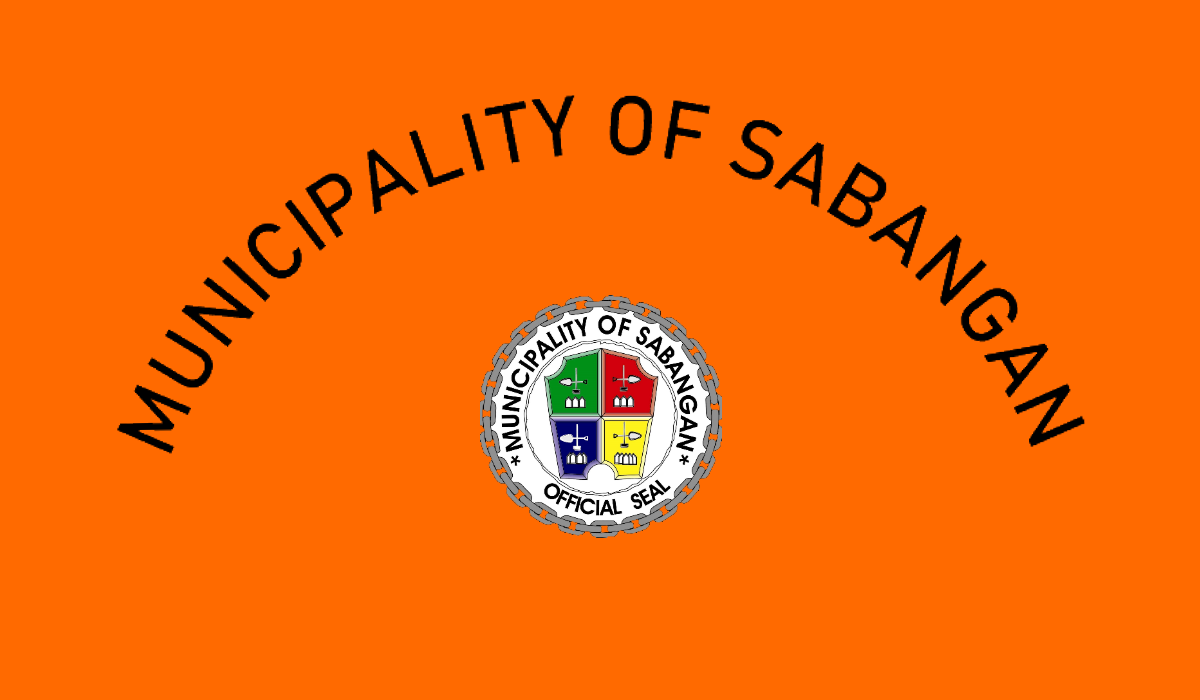
- Flag Seal

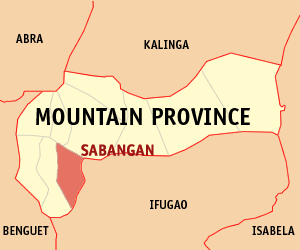
- Map of Mountain Province with Sabangan highlighted
- Interactive map of Sabangan
- Location within the Philippines
- Coordinates: 17°00′16″N 120°55′24″E
- Country: Philippines
- Region: Cordillera Administrative Region
- Province: Mountain Province
- District: Lone district
- Barangays: 15 (see Barangays)

Government
  - Type: Sangguniang Bayan
  - Mayor: Marcial C. Lawilao Jr.
  - Vice Mayor: Rodolfo L. Mencion
  - Representative: Maximo Y. Dalog Jr.
  - Electorate: 8,808 voters (2025)

Area
  - Total: 72.04 km^{2} (27.81 sq mi)
- Elevation: 1,441 m (4,728 ft)
- Highest elevation: 2,665 m (8,743 ft)
- Lowest elevation: 970 m (3,180 ft)

Population (2024 census)
  - Total: 8,556
  - Density: 118.8/km^{2} (307.6/sq mi)
  - Households: 2,303

Economy
  - Income class: 4th municipal income class
  - Poverty incidence: 17.78% (2023)
  - Revenue: ₱ 109.8 million (2024)
  - Assets: ₱ 421.3 million (2024)
  - Expenditure: ₱ 116.1 million (2024)
  - Liabilities: ₱ 160 million (2024)

Service provider
  - Electricity: Mountain Province Electric Cooperative (MOPRECO)
- Time zone: UTC+8 (PST)
- ZIP code: 2622
- PSGC: 1404407000
- IDD : area code: +63 (0)74
- Native languages: Balangao; Bontoc; Ilocano; Tagalog; Kankanaey
- Website: www.sabangan.gov.ph

Sabangan (IPA: [sʌˈbaː.ŋʌn]), officially the Municipality of Sabangan (Kankanaey: Ili di Sabangan; Ilocano: Ili ti Sabangan) is a municipality in the province of Mountain Province, Philippines. According to the 2024 census, it has a population of 8,556 people.

== History ==
=== Chico River Dam Project ===
Sabangan was one of several municipalities in Mountain Province which would have been flooded by the Chico River Dam Project during the Marcos dictatorship, alongside Bauko, Bontoc, Sadanga, Sagada, and parts of Barlig. However, the indigenous peoples of Kalinga Province and Mountain Province resisted the project and when hostilities resulted in the murder of Macli-ing Dulag, the project became unpopular and was abandoned before Marcos was ousted by the 1986 People Power Revolution.

== Geography ==
Sabangan is situated 18.46 kilometres (11.47 mi) from the provincial capital Bontoc, and 369.59 kilometres (229.65 mi) from the country's capital city of Manila.

=== Barangays ===
Sabangan is politically subdivided into 15 barangays. Each barangay consists of puroks and some have sitios.

- Bao-angan
- Bun-ayan
- Busa
- Camatagan
- Capinitan
- Data
- Gayang
- Lagan
- Losad
- Namatec
- Napua
- Pingad
- Poblacion
- Supang
- Tambingan

== Climate ==
Climate data for Sabangan, Mountain Province
Month	Jan	Feb	Mar	Apr	May	Jun	Jul	Aug	Sep	Oct	Nov	Dec	Year
Mean daily maximum °C (°F)	21 (70)	23 (73)	24 (75)	26 (79)	25 (77)	25 (77)	24 (75)	24 (75)	24 (75)	24 (75)	23 (73)	22 (72)	24 (75)
Mean daily minimum °C (°F)	15 (59)	15 (59)	16 (61)	18 (64)	19 (66)	19 (66)	19 (66)	19 (66)	19 (66)	18 (64)	17 (63)	16 (61)	18 (63)
Average precipitation mm (inches)	35 (1.4)	46 (1.8)	63 (2.5)	117 (4.6)	402 (15.8)	400 (15.7)	441 (17.4)	471 (18.5)	440 (17.3)	258 (10.2)	94 (3.7)	68 (2.7)	2,835 (111.6)
Average rainy days	9.9	19.5	13.9	18.9	26.0	27.3	28.9	28.5	26.1	19.7	14.5	12.8	246
Source: Meteoblue (modeled/calculated data, not measured locally)

== Demographics ==
Population census of Sabangan

Year	Pop.	±% p.a.
1903	49	—
1918	3,092	+31.83%
1939	4,706	+2.02%
1948	4,581	−0.30%
1960	8,900	+5.69%
1970	6,517	−3.06%

Year	Pop.	±% p.a.
1975	7,599	+3.13%
1980	8,194	+1.52%
1990	8,083	−0.14%
1995	8,609	+1.19%
2000	8,728	+0.29%
2007	9,098	+0.57%

Year	Pop.	±% p.a.
2010	8,741	−1.45%
2015	9,315	+1.22%
2020	9,621	+0.68%
2024	8,556	−2.78%

Source: Philippine Statistics Authority

In the 2024 census, the population of Sabangan was 8,556 people, with a density of 120 inhabitants per square kilometer or 310 inhabitants per square mile.

== Economy ==
Poverty incidence of Sabangan (%)

Source: Philippine Statistics Authority

The primary economic sources of Sabangan are agriculture and livestock. Farmers grow fruits and vegetables that are suited to cold climate. Farmers are also raising swine and poultry for local consumption and trade.

The hydro-power plant of the Aboitiz-owned Hydroelectric Development Corporation is operating in Sabangan.

== Government ==
=== Local government ===
Sabangan, belonging to the lone congressional district of the province of Mountain Province, is governed by a mayor designated as its local chief executive and by a municipal council as its legislative body in accordance with the Local Government Code. The mayor, vice mayor, and the councilors are elected directly by the people through an election which is being held every three years.

=== Elected officials ===
Members of the Municipal Council (2025–2028)
Position	Name
Congressman	Maximo Y. Dalog Jr.
Mayor	Marcial C. Lawilao Jr.
Vice-Mayor	Henrico B. Boguilis
Councilors	Fausto L. Ballakis
Councilors	Gabin Rhey G. Sudicalan
Councilors	Gabriel M. Puyongan
Councilors	Narciso B. Victoriano
Councilors	Roman B. Bacog
Councilors	Antonio M. Pagedped
Councilors	William M. Malamion
Councilors	Winston S. Sapdoy

== Education ==
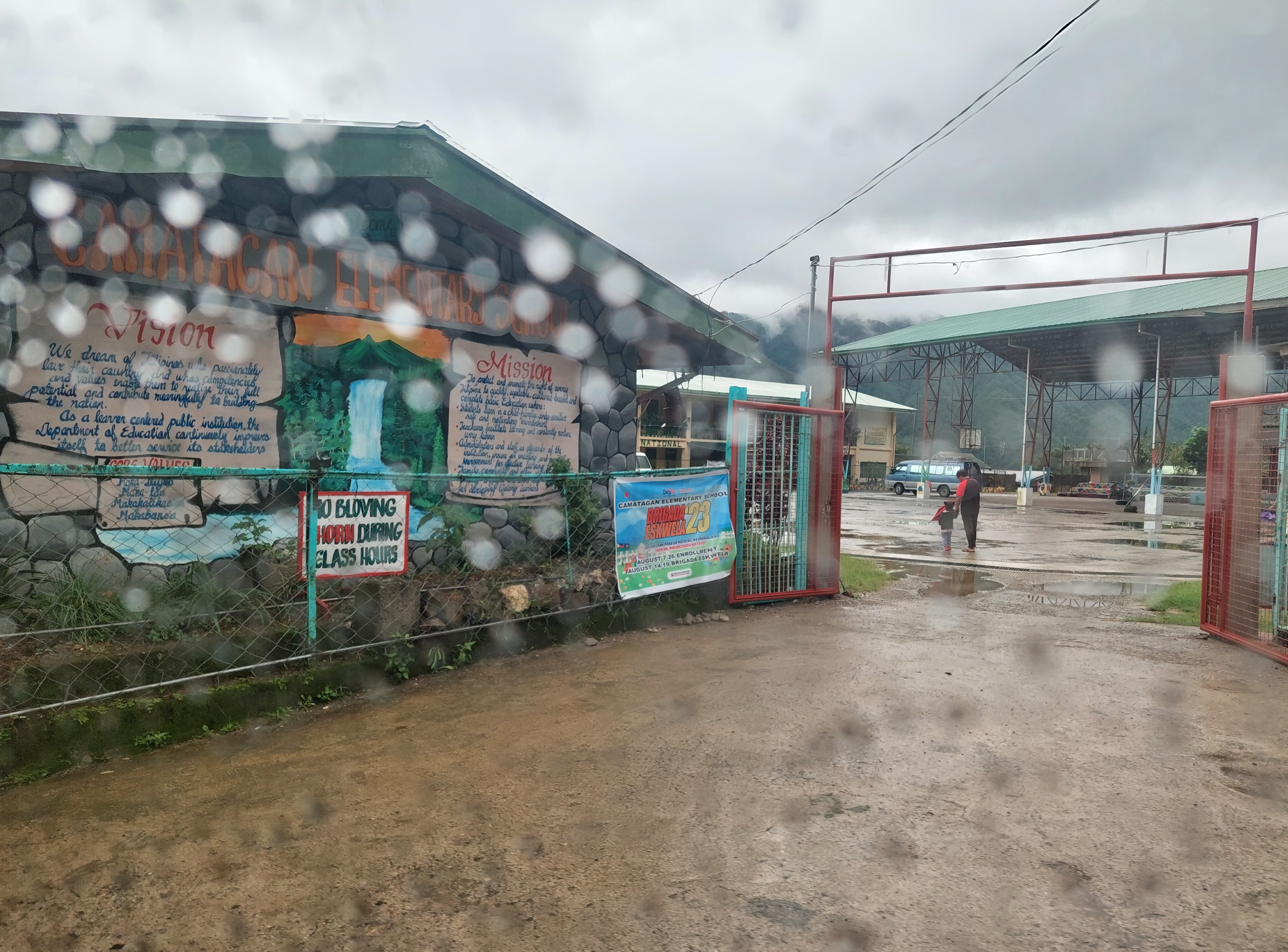
Camatagan Elementary School (front) and Pingad National High School (back)

The Sabangan Schools District Office governs all educational institutions within the municipality. It oversees the management and operations of all private and public, from primary to secondary schools.

=== Primary and elementary schools ===
- Bun-ayan Elementary School
- Busa Elementary School
- Camatagan Elementary School
- Capinitan Elementary School
- Data Elementary School
- Dumanegdeg Primary School
- Gayang Elementary School
- Labbay Primary School
- Lagan Elementary School
- Legleg Primary School
- Libo Elementary School
- Madepdeppas Elementary School
- Namatec Elementary School
- Napua Elementary School
- Pingad-Bao-angan Elementary School
- Sabangan Central School
- Sabangan Elementary School
- Supang Elementary School
- Tambingan Elementary School

=== Secondary schools ===
- Data National High School
- Namatec National High School
- Pingad National High School
- Sabangan National High School
- San Alfonso High School
