= List of barangays in Benguet =

The province of Benguet has 269 barangays comprising its 13 municipalities and 1 independent city.

== Barangays ==
Most populous in its respective municipality (as of 2010)

Barangay	Population					Municipality
Barangay	2010	2007	2000	1995	1990	Municipality
Abatan	2,780	2,834	2,661	1,800	2,244	Buguias
Abiang	1,766	1,926	1,673	1,605	1,692	Atok
Adaoay	670	533	446	479	521	Kabayan
Alapang	4,171	3,627	2,752	2,665	1,880	La Trinidad
Alno	2,046	1,821	1,727	1,408	1,180	La Trinidad
Ambassador	4,799	4,249	3,977	4,032	3,005	Tublay
Ambiong	6,423	5,282	3,139	2,543	2,229	La Trinidad
Ambongdolan	980	934	965	992	971	Tublay
Ambuclao	3,013	2,933	2,613	2,199	2,892	Bokod
Amgaleyguey	3,538	2,098	2,677	2,485	3,780	Buguias
Amlimay	2,197	2,239	2,227	1,858	1,706	Buguias
Ampucao	10,450	9,534	10,285	11,174	11,770	Itogon
Ampusongan	2,178	2,034	1,923	1,929	1,763	Bakun
Anchokey	296	249	286	285	259	Kabayan
Ansagan	2,083	2,168	2,118	1,868	1,664	Tuba
Ba-ayan	1,736	1,466	1,747	1,834	1,481	Tublay
Baculongan Norte	2,157	2,023	1,986	1,710	1,432	Buguias
Baculongan Sur	3,169	2,719	2,605	2,205	3,025	Buguias
Badeo	840	819	897	886	779	Kibungan
Bagong	764	757	837	757	713	Sablan
Bagu	856	663	1,011	1,016	987	Bakun
Bahong	4,828	3,997	3,000	2,969	2,669	La Trinidad
Balakbak	1,372	1,277	1,296	1,085	1,038	Kapangan
Balili	16,086	16,734	9,463	9,122	5,862	La Trinidad
Balili	6,236	5,617	4,821	4,682	3,673	Mankayan
Ballay	2,623	2,461	1,994	1,648	1,435	Kabayan
Balluay	507	612	428	438	408	Sablan
Banangan	1,756	1,763	1,482	1,510	1,437	Sablan
Banengbeng	1,108	1,202	998	962	850	Sablan
Bangao	4,269	3,947	3,613	1,999	2,283	Buguias
Bashoy	1,597	1,334	1,234	1,056	931	Kabayan
Basil	1,198	1,012	1,020	948	871	Tublay
Batan	944	1,206	1,204	951	1,092	Kabayan
Bayabas	2,068	1,993	2,005	1,831	1,593	Sablan
Beckel	3,453	3,544	2,969	2,833	2,339	La Trinidad
Bedbed	864	1,032	985	925	803	Mankayan
Beleng-Belis	984	773	958	908	875	Kapangan
Betag	6,863	6,235	5,591	5,789	4,988	La Trinidad
Bila	991	1,134	1,125	975	1,003	Bokod
Bineng	1,487	1,312	1,277	1,067	785	La Trinidad
Bobok-Bisal	1,086	1,200	1,184	1,080	1,145	Bokod
Boklaoan	644	467	542	418	468	Kapangan
Bulalacao	3,349	2,584	2,881	2,471	2,120	Mankayan
Buyacaoan	3,160	3,036	2,880	2,186	1,884	Buguias
Cabiten	1,854	1,844	1,867	1,850	1,651	Mankayan
Calamagan	739	653	610	675	657	Buguias
Caliking	3,155	2,811	2,437	2,067	1,661	Atok
Camp One	1,742	1,401	2,118	1,403	1,378	Tuba
Camp 3	10,413	9,814	12,973	16,285	18,441	Tuba
Camp 4	5,973	5,217	4,244	4,203	5,034	Tuba
Caponga (Poblacion)	1,937	2,018	1,522	1,468	1,318	Tublay
Catlubong	2,758	2,468	1,788	1,600	1,094	Buguias
Cattubo	2,674	2,354	2,203	1,882	1,872	Atok
Cayapes	962	743	864	653	714	Kapangan
Colalo	1,232	1,036	1,052	959	902	Mankayan
Cruz	3,519	2,970	2,615	2,730	1,617	La Trinidad
Cuba	995	982	1,086	844	911	Kapangan
Daclan	1,748	1,856	1,466	1,401	1,354	Bokod
Daclan	4,049	3,762	2,748	2,331	2,170	Tublay
Dalipey	2,164	2,086	1,968	1,996	1,753	Bakun
Dalupirip	2,578	2,432	2,389	2,247	1,967	Itogon
Datakan	1,699	1,680	1,596	1,421	1,290	Kapangan
Duacan	709	642	599	539	528	Kabayan
Eddet	740	707	585	519	445	Kabayan
Ekip	806	926	880	784	720	Bokod
Gadang	1,534	1,429	1,448	1,175	1,298	Kapangan
Gambang	3,705	3,262	3,120	3,706	2,731	Bakun
Gaswiling	1,129	784	928	738	713	Kapangan
Guinaoang	1,855	1,575	1,806	1,870	1,431	Mankayan
Gumatdang	1,895	1,573	1,423	1,221	3,461	Itogon
Gusaran	1,330	1,400	1,290	1,051	1,050	Kabayan
Kabayan Barrio	337	269	349	336	322	Kabayan
Kamog	1,064	1,224	997	882	814	Sablan
Karao	958	1,013	917	837	853	Bokod
Kayapa	1,527	1,277	1,346	1,396	1,208	Bakun
Labueg	1,572	1,578	1,497	1,219	1,257	Kapangan
Lengaoan	1,488	1,378	1,751	–	–	Buguias
Loacan	7,714	6,782	5,899	5,918	10,802	Itogon
Loo	4,388	3,886	3,620	3,433	2,704	Buguias
Lubas	5,591	4,602	3,105	2,582	1,531	La Trinidad
Lubo	1,235	1,086	950	1,031	780	Kibungan
Lusod	794	658	837	881	815	Kabayan
Madaymen	5,875	4,941	5,020	4,516	3,738	Kibungan
Naguey	1,723	1,759	1,526	1,544	1,401	Atok
Nangalisan	2,428	2,285	2,127	2,049	1,767	Tuba
Natubleng	2,513	2,019	1,986	2,107	1,896	Buguias
Nawal	743	681	696	589	694	Bokod
Paco	6,035	6,576	7,100	7,437	8,325	Mankayan
Pacso	1,247	1,200	1,619	949	1,024	Kabayan
Palasaan	2,348	2,147	1,678	1,786	1,535	Mankayan
Palina	1,387	1,408	1,255	1,103	1,113	Kibungan
Paoay	4,181	4,686	3,855	3,552	2,967	Atok
Pappa	594	613	631	571	693	Sablan
Pasdong	1,078	1,033	907	851	847	Atok
Paykek	1,550	1,395	1,414	1,147	1,177	Kapangan
Pico	18,271	16,577	11,005	10,497	8,667	La Trinidad
Pito	838	826	671	698	593	Bokod
Poblacion	2,045	2,355	1,937	1,581	1,652	Atok
Poblacion	1,964	1,751	1,655	1,455	1,652	Bokod
Poblacion	2,532	2,391	2,306	2,150	2,352	Kibungan
Poblacion	10,594	10,627	7,167	6,411	5,150	La Trinidad
Poblacion	3,084	3,355	3,606	3,944	4,115	Mankayan
Poblacion	2,650	2,726	2,274	2,219	1,932	Sablan
Poblacion	5,958	4,536	3,333	3,503	2,584	Tuba
Poblacion (Central)	1,834	1,624	1,570	1,505	1,183	Bakun
Poblacion (Central)	3,472	2,957	2,853	2,807	2,531	Buguias
Poblacion (Central)	3,267	3,179	2,858	4,545	5,520	Itogon
Poblacion (Central)	1,567	1,300	1,277	1,251	1,326	Kabayan
Poblacion Central	1,841	1,743	1,391	1,149	1,032	Kapangan
Pongayan	945	681	664	594	670	Kapangan
Pudong	1,373	1,296	1,257	1,021	1,235	Kapangan
Puguis	7,163	6,551	4,269	4,228	3,427	La Trinidad
Sagpat	3,101	2,842	2,384	2,132	1,772	Kibungan
Sagubo	1,697	1,592	1,360	1,186	1,221	Kapangan
San Pascual	1,080	812	1,026	1,060	884	Tuba
Sapid	3,271	3,981	4,003	4,023	3,678	Mankayan
Sebang	2,643	2,250	1,920	–	–	Buguias
Shilan	4,330	3,419	2,848	2,789	2,420	La Trinidad
Sinacbat	1,323	1,191	1,275	1,288	1,192	Bakun
Taba-ao	1,787	1,801	1,836	1,768	1,638	Kapangan
Tabaan Norte	1,133	1,220	1,338	1,112	893	Tuba
Tabaan Sur	1,264	1,260	1,118	1,026	942	Tuba
Tabio	3,792	3,447	3,280	3,321	3,276	Mankayan
Tacadang	1,880	2,213	2,224	2,330	2,219	Kibungan
Tadiangan	5,685	5,457	3,868	3,558	3,117	Tuba
Taloy Norte	1,307	1,370	985	1,028	913	Tuba
Taloy Sur	2,681	2,669	2,242	1,649	1,161	Tuba
Taneg	1,666	1,369	1,423	1,431	1,380	Mankayan
Tawang	7,456	6,294	4,813	3,529	2,363	La Trinidad
Tawangan	734	698	624	565	558	Kabayan
Tikey	501	593	498	508	568	Bokod
Tinongdan	4,216	3,923	3,756	3,380	2,661	Itogon
Topdac	2,620	2,329	2,119	1,780	1,761	Atok
Tublay Central	896	730	683	683	692	Tublay
Tuding	7,703	6,535	6,936	5,986	5,294	Itogon
Tuel	960	925	1,010	975	971	Tublay
Twin Peaks	1,127	1,799	876	845	857	Tuba
Ucab	7,870	6,895	6,022	6,278	5,731	Itogon
Virac	10,267	7,925	7,137	7,032	14,567	Itogon
Wangal	4,907	4,218	2,223	1,927	1,145	La Trinidad
Barangay	2010	2007	2000	1995	1990	Municipality
*Italicized names are former names.; *Dashes (–) in cells indicate unavailable census data.

[top]
