= Benguet =

Province in Cordillera, Philippines

- Province
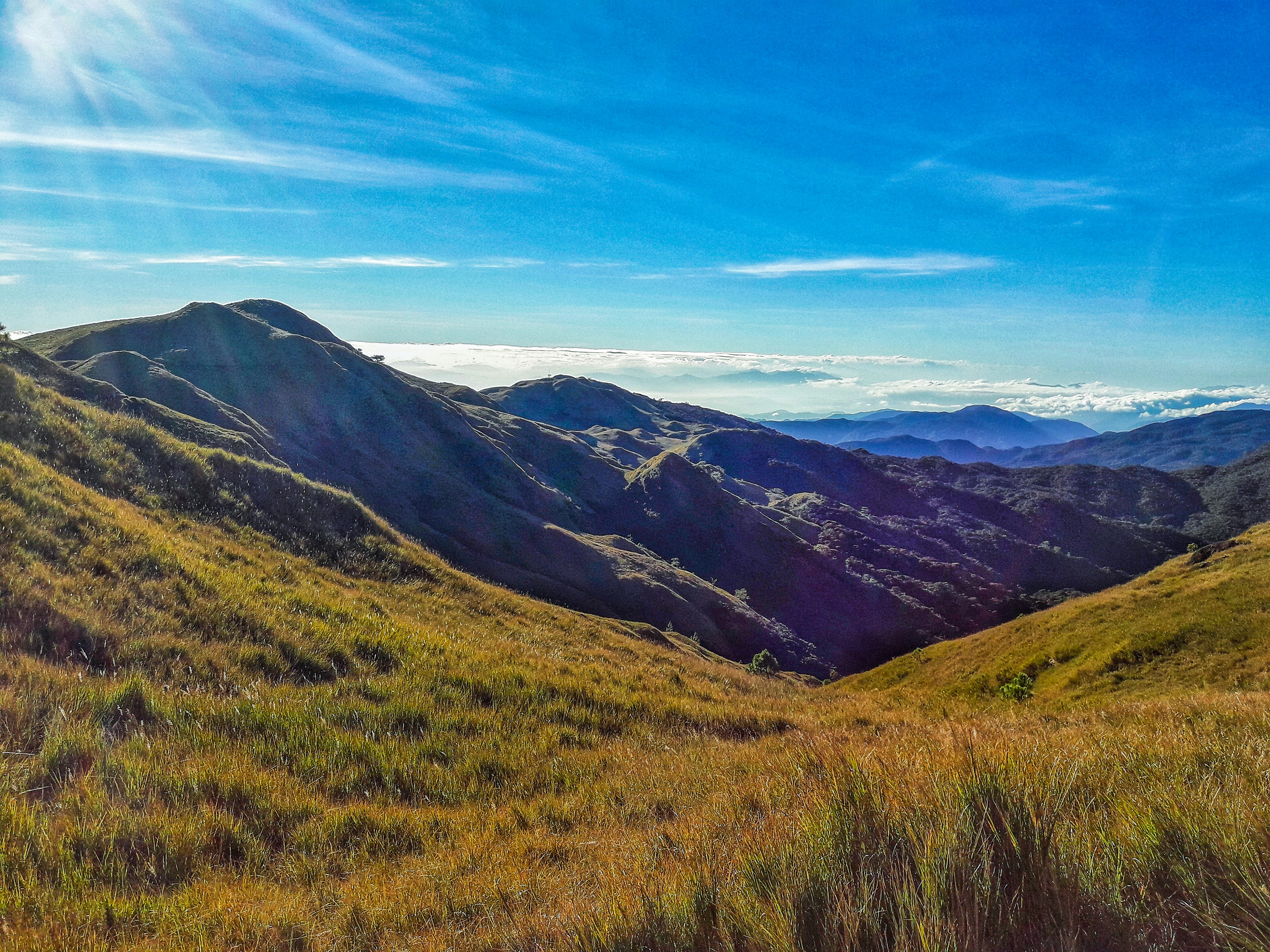
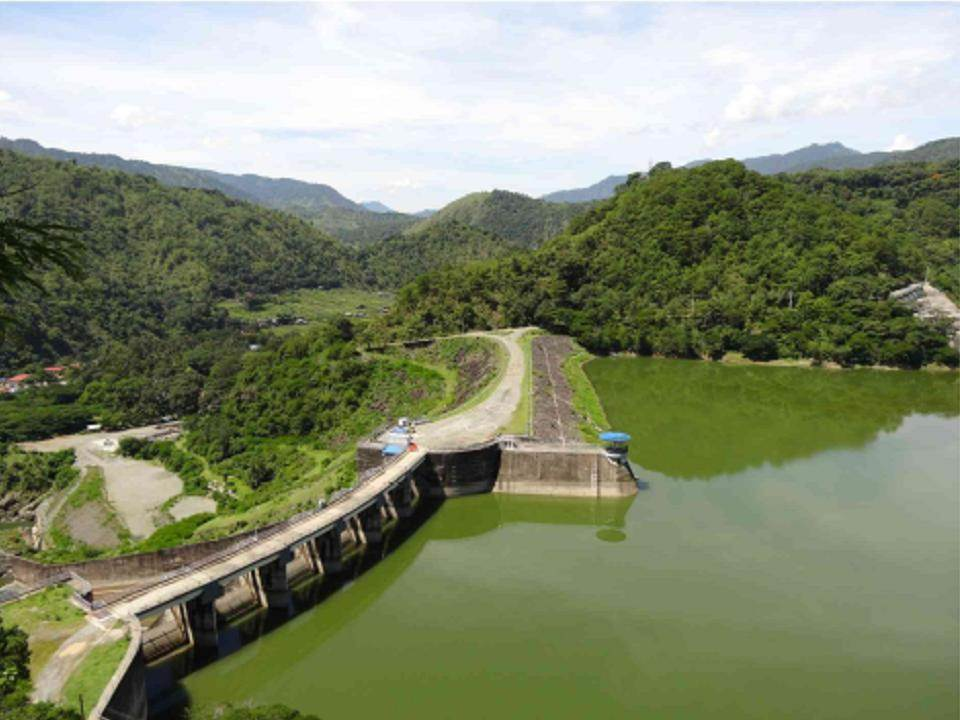
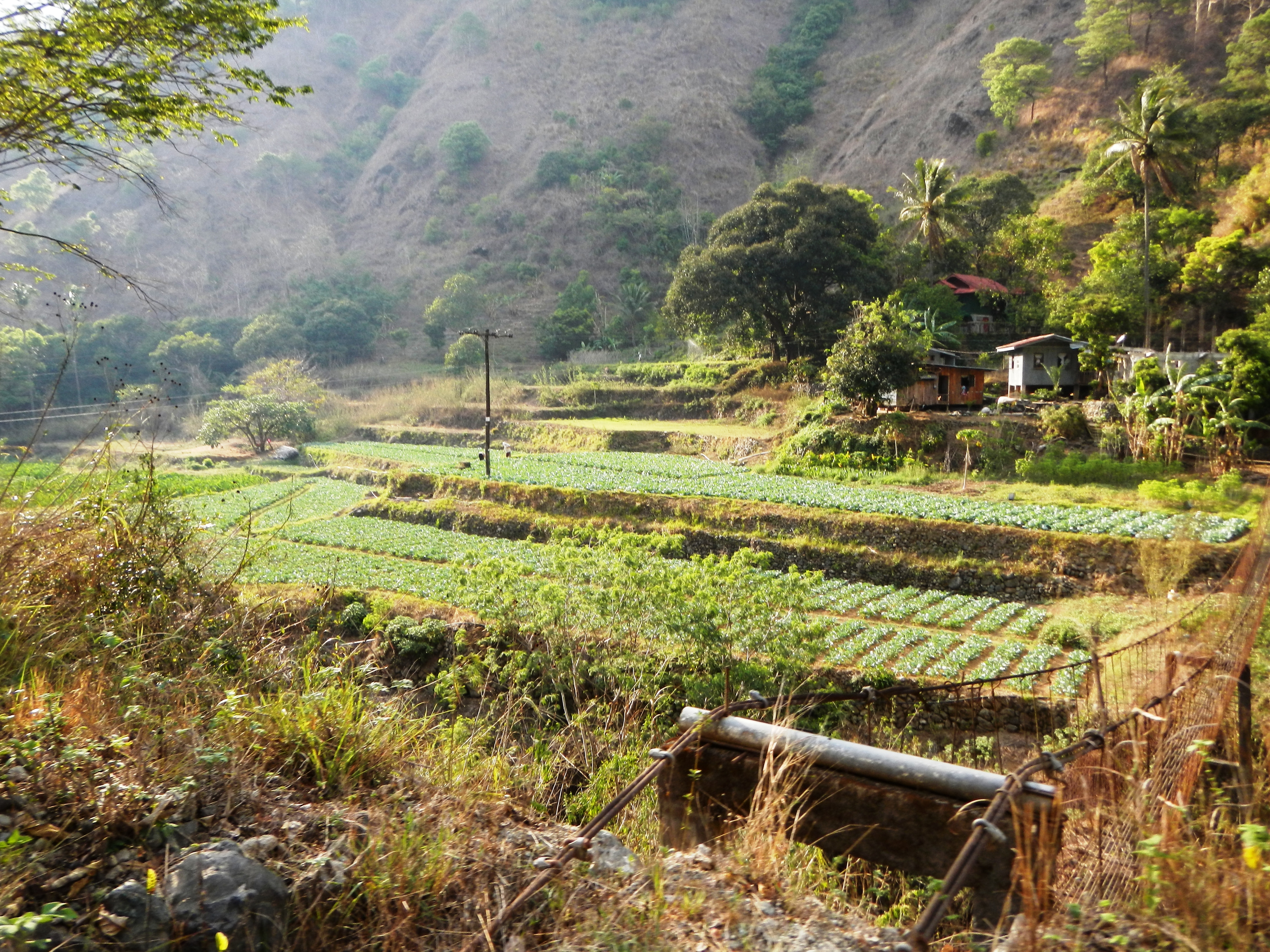
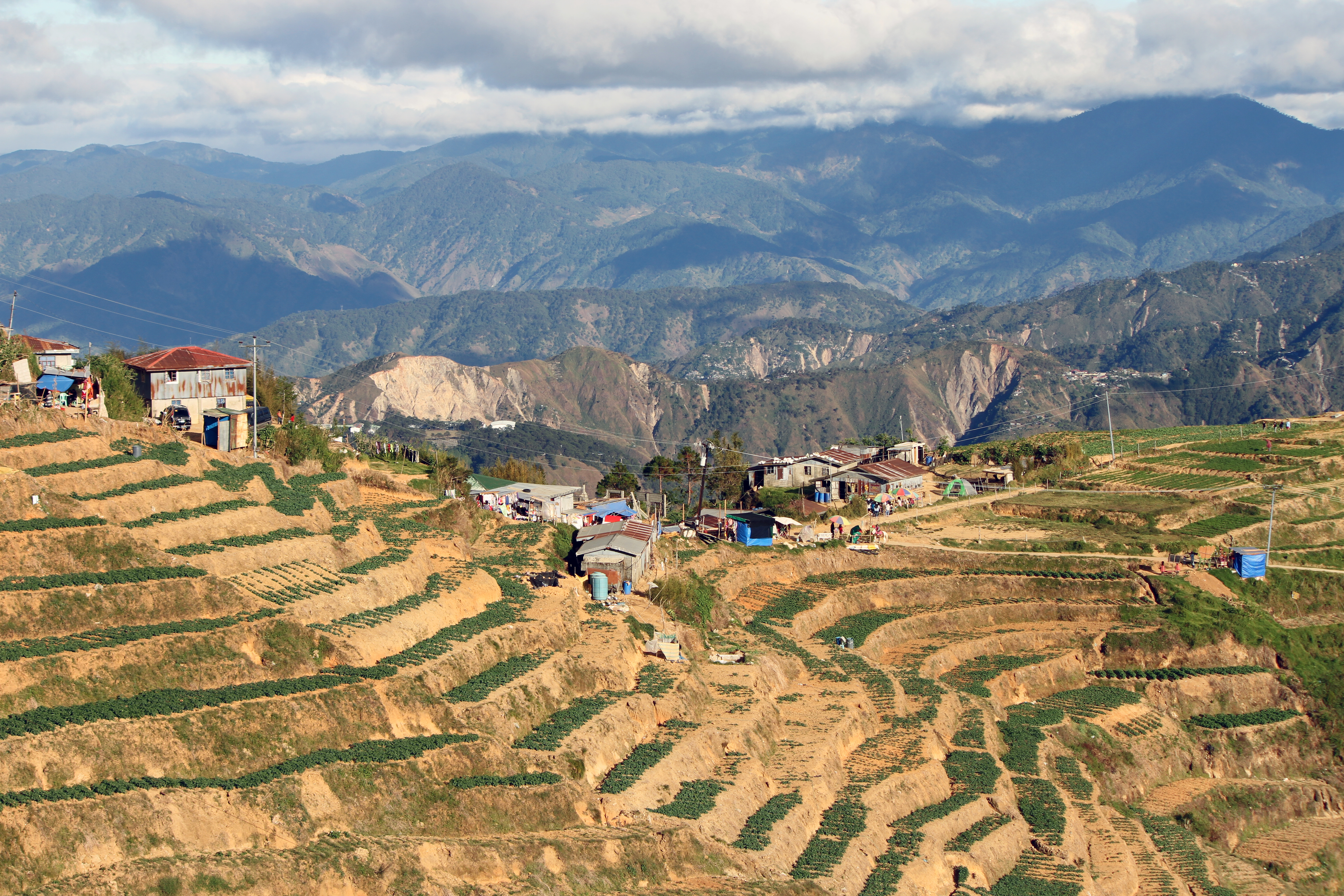
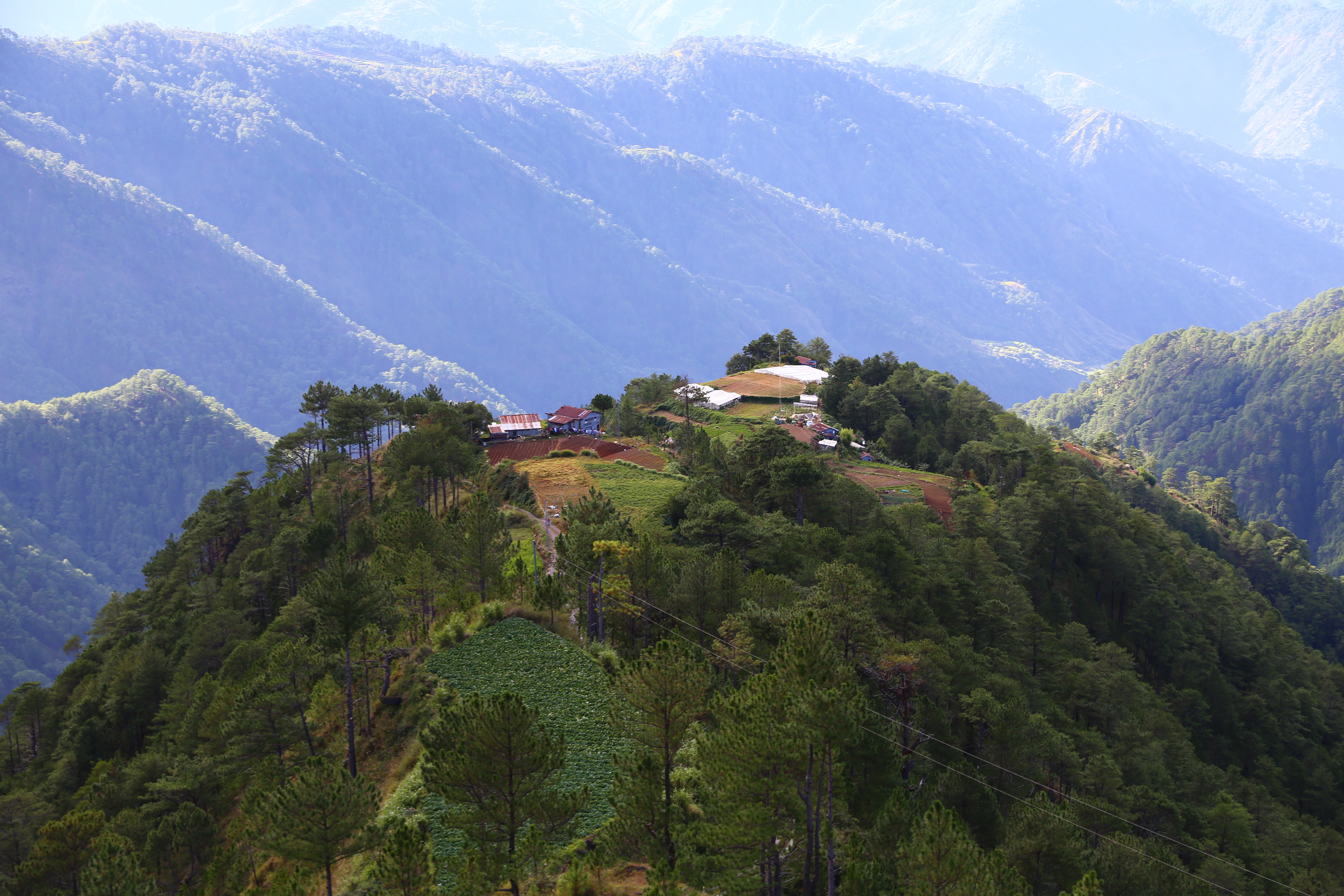
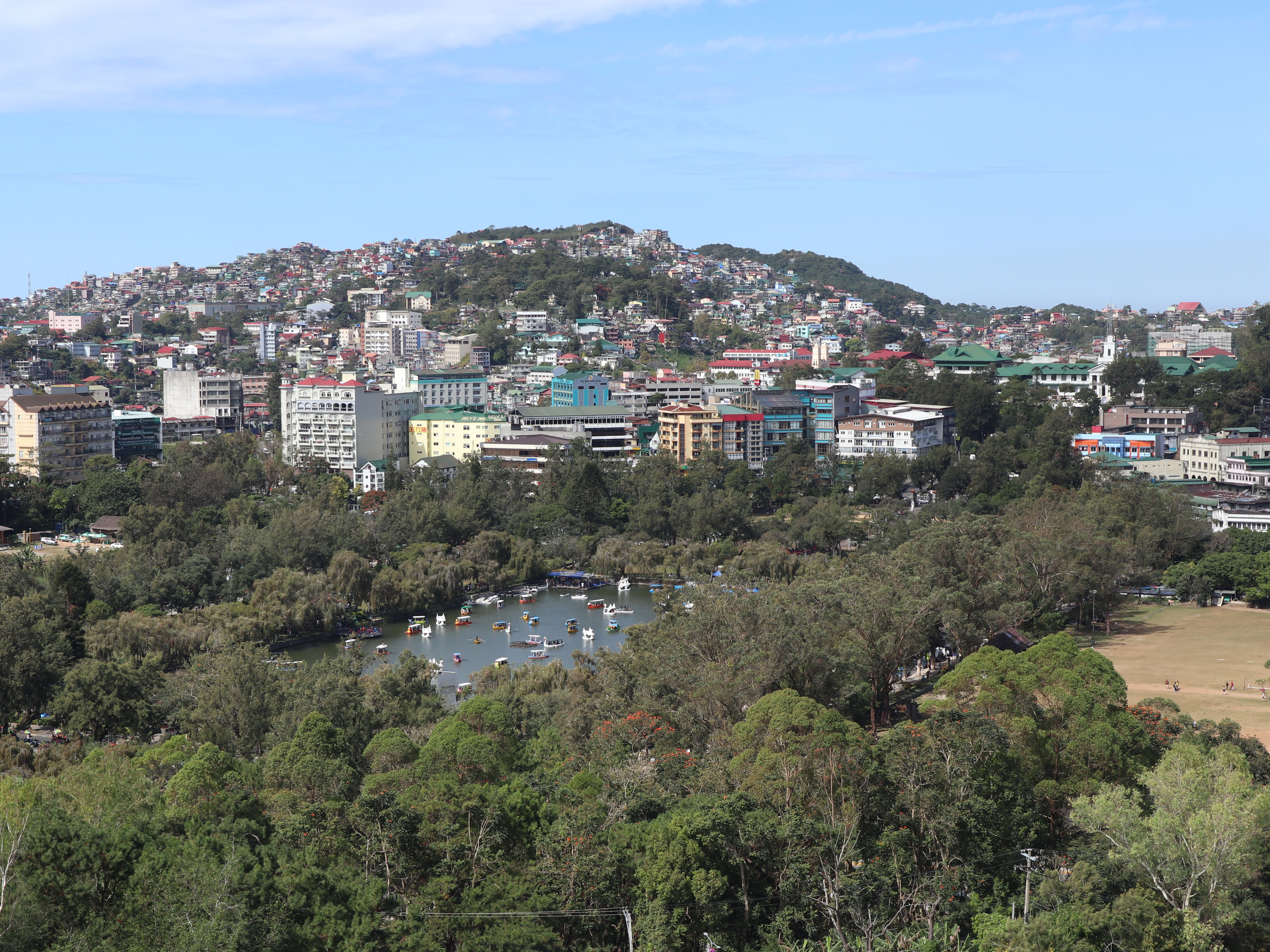
- (from top: left to right) Mount Pulag in Benguet, Binga Dam in Itogon, Plantations in Bokod, Mount Kabuyao in La Presa, mountain view in Atok, Benguet Provincial Capitol in La Trinidad and Baguio City.

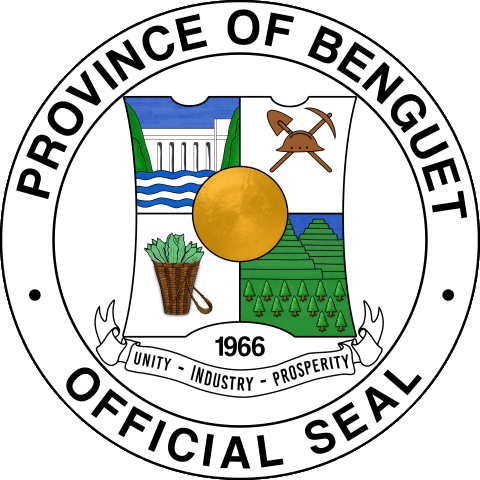
- Flag Seal
- Nickname: Salad Bowl of the Philippines
- Motto: Unity, Industry, Prosperity
- Anthem: Benguet Hymn
- Location in the Philippines
- Interactive map of Benguet
- Coordinates: 17°N 121°E
- Country: Philippines
- Region: Cordillera Administrative Region
- Founded: November 23, 1900
- Province: June 16, 1966
- Capital: La Trinidad
- Largest city: Baguio*

Government
  - Governor: Melchor D. Diclas (Lakas)
  - Vice Governor: Marie Rose Fongwan-Kepes (Lakas)
  - Representative: Eric Yap
  - Legislature: Benguet Provincial Board
  - Electorate: 416,145 voters (2025)

Area
  - Total: 2,769.08 km^{2} (1,069.15 sq mi)
  - Rank: 47th out of 82
- (excluding Baguio)
- Highest elevation (Mount Pulag): 2,928 m (9,606 ft)

Population (2024 census)
  - Total: 473,190
  - Rank: 61st out of 82
  - Density: 170.88/km^{2} (442.59/sq mi)
  - Rank: 55th out of 82
  - Households: 116,692
- (excluding Baguio)
- Demonyms: i-Benguet; Bengueteño

Divisions
  - Independent cities: 1: Baguio*
  - Component cities: 0
  - Municipalities: 13: Atok; Bakun; Bokod; Buguias; Itogon; Kabayan; Kapangan; Kibungan; La Trinidad; Mankayan; Sablan; Tuba; Tublay
  - Barangays: 140; including independent cities: 269
  - Districts: Legislative districts of Benguet; including independent cities: Legislative district of Baguio

Economy
  - Income class: 1st provincial income class
  - Poverty incidence: 2.5% (2023)
  - Revenue: ₱ 2,342 million (2024)
  - Assets: ₱ 6,658 million (2024)
  - Expenditure: ₱ 2,828 million (2024)
  - Liabilities: ₱ 808.2 million (2024)
- Time zone: UTC+8 (PST)
- PSGC: 141100000
- IDD : area code: +63 (0)74
- ISO 3166 code: PH-BEN
- Spoken languages: Filipino; Ilocano; Ibaloi; Pangasinan; Kankanaey; Kalanguya; Karao; English
- Website: benguet.gov.ph
- * Baguio is a highly-urbanized city, politically independent from Benguet.

Benguet (/bɛŋˈɡɛt/), officially the Province of Benguet (Ibaloi: Probinsya ne Benguet; Kankanaey: Probinsyan di Benguet; Pangasinan: Luyag/Probinsia na Benguet; Ilocano: Probinsia ti Benguet; Filipino: Lalawigan ng Benguet), is a landlocked province of the Philippines located in the southern tip of the Cordillera Administrative Region in the island of Luzon. Its capital is La Trinidad.

The highland province is known as the Salad Bowl of the Philippines due to its huge production of upland vegetables.

Situated within the interior of Benguet is the highly urbanized city of Baguio, which is administered independent from the province and also its largest city and regional center of Cordillera Administrative Region.

== Etymology ==
Hispanicized rendering of benget, Kankanaey word for "edge." This was the original name of the settlement at the edge of a swamp formed by the Balili River flooding the flat valley floor.

== History ==
=== Early history ===
The mountainous area now covered by Benguet is generally presumed to have been settled from at least the 14th century by tribes coming from the surrounding lowlands, lured by the abundance of natural resources such as gold, hides, and wax. Two of these groups, the Ibaloi and the Kankanaey, are dominant ethnolinguistic groups of the area. In the pre-conquest period, these tribes enjoyed flourishing trade with lowland groups immediately to their west and south, such as the Pangasinans. Governor Juan "Oraa" Cariño (1913–1918), one of Benguet’s governors, was the first Filipino governor.

The Kankanaey occupied the northern highlands of the province, while the Ibaloy occupied the southern portion, while all Igorots practiced animism and ancestor worship. Rituals were proscribed by the priests, mambunong. The economy of the region was based on rice terraces, root crop swidden farming, livestock raising, hunting, foraging, plus the mining and trading of gold. These Igorot gold mines were located in Suyoc, Tabio, Acupan, and Antamok. Gold panning took place in placer deposits along the Agno River, the Bued River, the Suyoc River, and the Amburayan River. Gold was also mined from lode veins within andesite and diorite. Gold in Mankayan was associated with copper. Gold mining resulted in social stratification, with the upper class consisting of the mine owners, the baknang, followed by the gold workers, or abiteg, and then the bagaen, or slave class. These slaves were made up of war captives, and their children. Gold mines were inheritable kinship property, while original ownership was bestowed on those individuals discovering the gold location, and then developing the property.

=== Spanish colonial era ===
At the beginning of the Spanish Era, colonisers heard of the rich gold mines in the mountains and attempted to colonize the highlands, but failed. In 1572, Spanish conquistador Juan de Salcedo led a small expedition into the southern part of Benguet, but the natives forced it to retreat. The first major expedition into the mountains occurred in 1620, when Spanish explorers went into the La Trinidad Valley, followed by a second expedition in 1623, and a third in 1624. This was the last attempt to occupy the Baguio gold mines by the Spanish until the Galvey expeditions (1829-1839).

In the 1800s, Spanish colonizers made more serious attempts such as expeditions under Col. Guillermo Galvey and succeeded in establishing a presence in the La Trinidad Valley, named after Galvey's wife.

This area later became a district of the new province of La Montañosa (or La Montaña) in 1846. Eight years later, in 1854, Benguet became a separate comandancia politico-militar. Parts of the present province were established as component territories of other comandancias such as Lepanto and Amburayan.

=== American colonial era ===
When the Americans took control of the Philippines, they established local civil governments in many parts of the country. American civilian government was established in Benguet on November 23, 1900, through Act No. 48, with Canadian journalist H.P. Whitmarsh appointed as the province's first governor.

The 19 historical townships of Benguet under Act No. 48
| Township | Abolished? | Notes | Township | Abolished? | Notes |
|---|---|---|---|---|---|
| Adaoay | Yes | Currently part of Kabayan | Itogon | No | |
| Ambuklao | Yes | Currently part of Bokod | Kabayan | No | |
| Ampusongan | Yes | Currently part of Bakun | Kapangan | No | |
| Atok | No | | Kibungan | No | |
| Baguio | Yes | Converted into a chartered city in 1909* | La Trinidad | No | |
| Balakbak | Yes | Currently part of Kapangan | Loo | Yes | Currently part of Buguias |
| Bokod | No | | Palina | Yes | Currently part of Kibungan |
| Buguias | No | | Sablan | No | |
| Daclan | Yes | Currently part of Bokod | Tublay | No | |
| Galiano | Yes | | | | |
When Baguio was converted into a chartered city in 1909, barrio Tuba was separated from the city and incorporated into the township of Twin Peaks.

Upon the American colonial government enacting Act No. 1876 on August 18, 1908, which created Mountain Province from areas of the old La Montañosa, Benguet (along with Amburayan, Apayao, Bontoc, Ifugao, Kalinga, and Lepanto) became sub-provinces of this new province. A year later in 1909, the township of Baguio was abolished upon its conversion into a chartered city. In 1920, portions of the sub-provinces of Amburayan and Lepanto were incorporated into Benguet.

Mining companies started operating in the province in the 1930s. This brought jobs, and many lowlanders migrated to Benguet, especially in towns surrounding the gold mines, such as Itogon, Mankayan and Tuba.

=== Japanese occupation ===
During World War II, Igorot guerrillas and the combined Filipino and American forces fought Japanese soldiers during the final days of the war in 1945.

As part of the Japanese defence of the Philippines, General Tomoyuki Yamashita situated his military headquarters in Baguio, from where he organised the Japanese resistance on Lúzon from December 1944 to April 1945, before he relocated to the town of Bambang.

=== Contemporary history ===
On June 18, 1966, the huge Mountain Province was split into four provinces with the enactment of Republic Act No. 4695. The four provinces were Benguet, Mountain Province, Kalinga-Apayao and Ifugao.

On June 22, 1973, as part of the Integrated Organization Plan of President Ferdinand Marcos, Benguet was placed under the jurisdiction of the Ilocos Region.

When the Cordillera Administrative Region was established by President Corazon Aquino through Executive Order 220 on July 15, 1987, Benguet was made one of its provinces.

== Geology ==
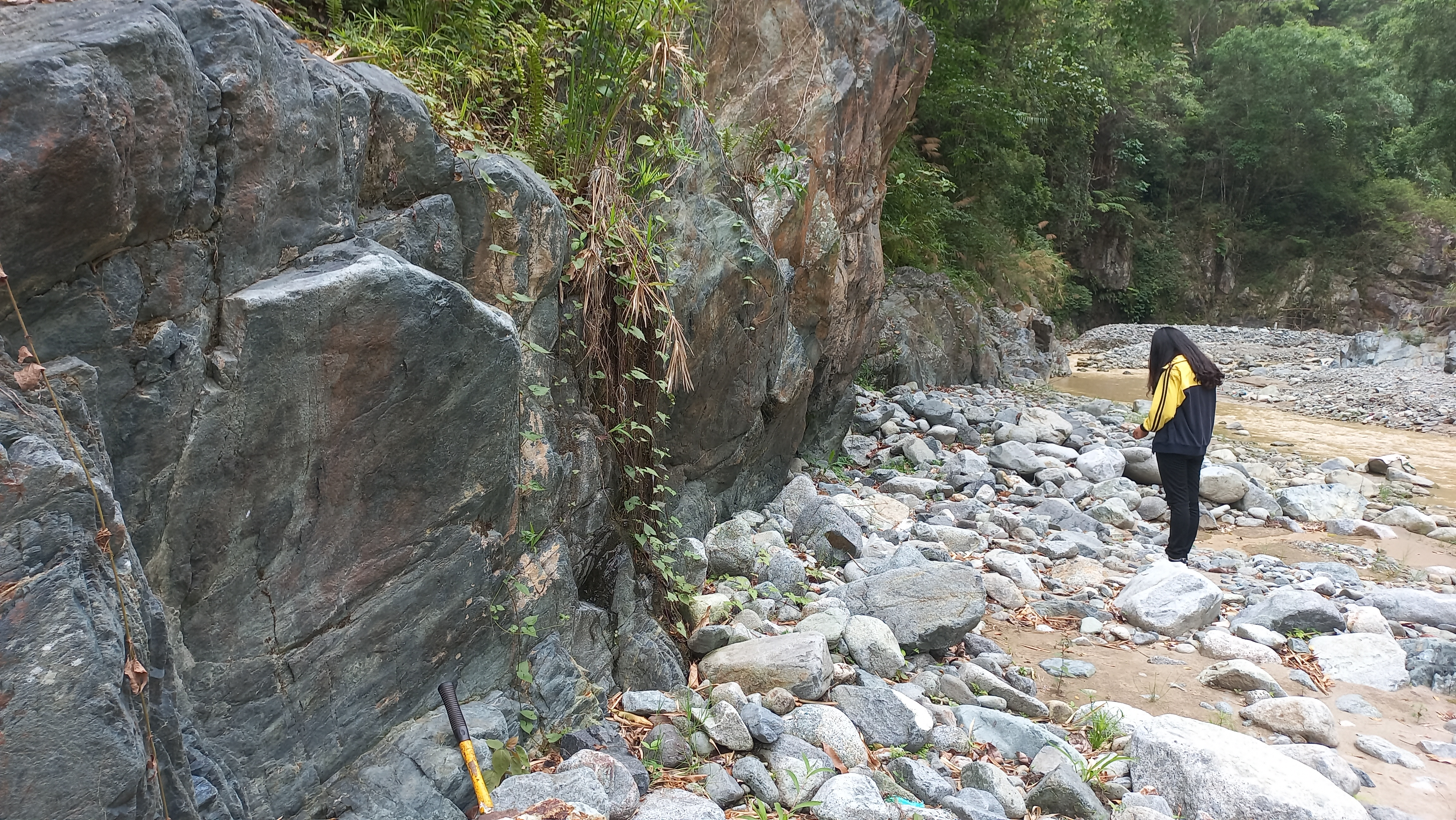
Dalupirip schist in Itogon, Benguet

The Baguio Mining District consists of Late Cretaceous ophiolite basement rocks. These are overlain by Eocene back arc tholeiitic Pugo Metavolcanics. These grade into the Dalupirip Schist, which is separated from the Early Oligocene-Early Miocene sedimentary Zigzag Formation by an unconformity. The Zigzag is composed of deep depositional environment interbedded green sandstones, red siltstones, oligomicitc conglomerates, and minor limestone units. The late Early Miocene-early Middle Miocene reefal Kennon Limestone overlays the Zigzag. The Late Oligocene-Early Miocene Agno Batholith intrudes the Pugo and Zigzag. The Middle-Late Miocene Klondyke Formation was deposited during Central Cordillera geologic uplift, consisting of coarse clastics, polymictic conglomerates, sandstones, and vitric (glassy) tuffs, with minor shales and siltstones. Gold mineralization occurred with dioritic and gabbroic intrusions, and basaltic to andesitic lavas, including the Monglo adakite. The Pliocene Baguio Formation consists of conglomerates interbedded with lava flows and pyroclastics. Pleistocene gold-copper mineralization occurred with calc-alkaline and dioritic and dacitic adakitic intrusions. This mineralization characterizes the Philex Mine.

The main gold base metal mineralization zone is approximately 8 km wide, trends north south for tens of kilometers, and is centrally located at 16° 20' to 16° 26' N latitude and 120° 37' 30" to 120° 43' 30" E longitude. The western boundary of this zone is defined by a volcanic belt, just west of Baguio, while the eastern boundary is defined by an intrusive belt, just east of the Itogon and Antamok mines. The Agno quartz diorite batholith is further east near Binga Dam. Key mines, starting from the south, include the Philex (Cu), Acupan (Au), Itogon (Au), Black Mt. (Cu), Benguet Exploration (Cu), Atok (Au), Antamok (Cu and Au), and Baguio Gold (Au), where Baguio Gold and Antamok are east of Baguio. Continuing northwards, key mines include the King Solomon (Cu), St. Nino (Cu), Boneng (Cu), Lobo (Cu), Gambang (Cu and Au), and Lepanto (Cu and Au). By 1979, underground mining had reached Level 1850 in the Antamok Mine.

== Geography ==
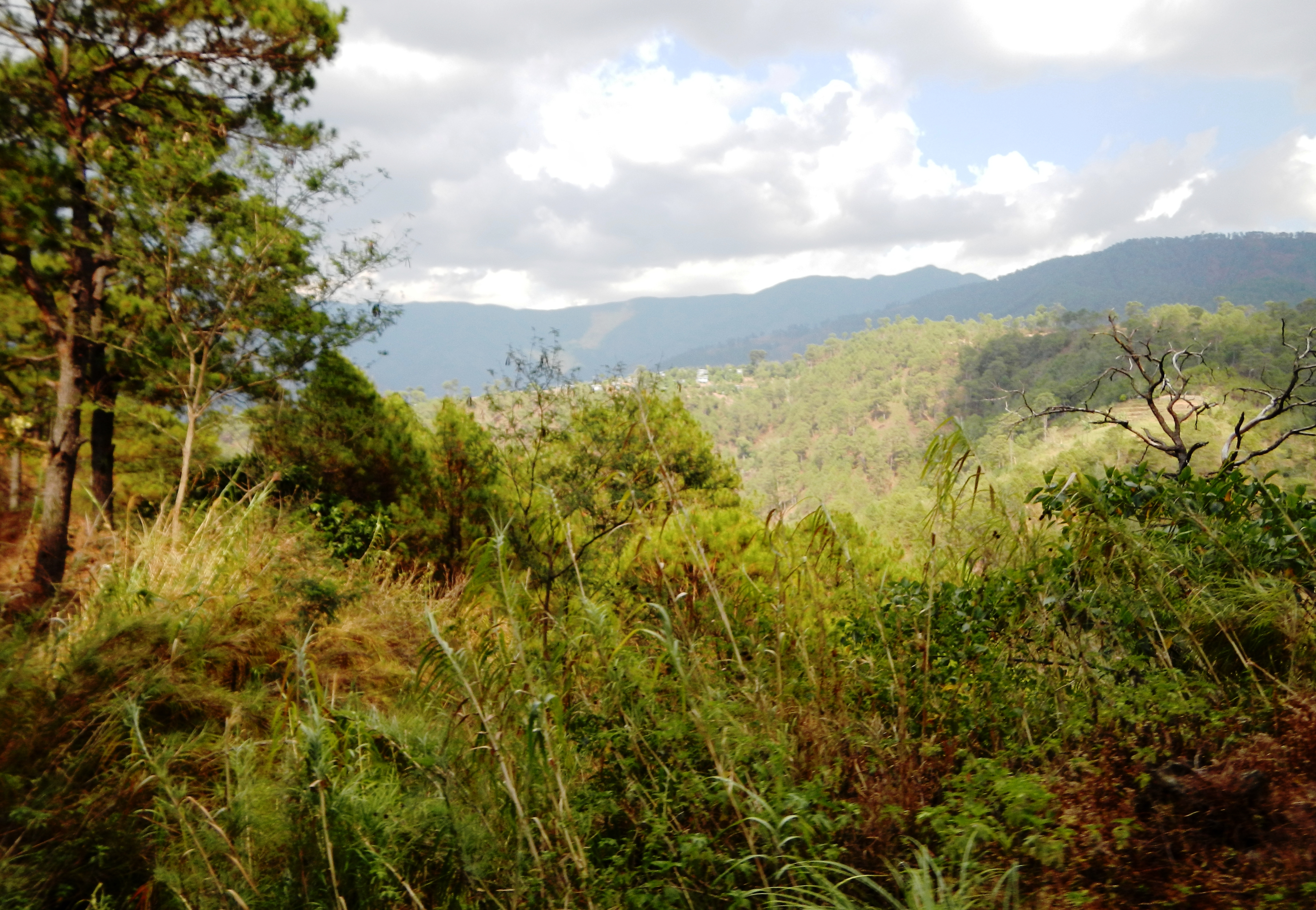
Highland landscape at Bokod

Benguet covers an area of 2,769.08 square kilometres (1,069.15 sq mi) occupying the southwestern tip of the Cordillera Administrative Region. If Baguio is included for geographical purposes, the total area of Benguet is 2,826.59 square kilometres (1,091.35 sq mi).

The province is bordered on the northeast by Mountain Province and Ifugao, on the southeast by Nueva Vizcaya, on the south by Pangasinan, on the west by La Union, and on the northwest by Ilocos Sur.

Situated within the Cordillera mountains, Benguet is dominantly mountainous. Mount Pulag, the highest in Luzon is located within Kabayan. The mountains form the headwaters of several rivers, the major ones which include the Agno, Amburayan, Bued, Bakun, Balili and the Asin. Some of these run through river valleys or gorges.

Several natural lakes, small in size, are found within the hinterlands. The largest are the "Four Lakes" in Kabayan; Lake Bulalacao, Lake Detepngepos, Lake Incolos and Lake Tabeyo.

The province is the location of several conservation areas, the largest of which are the Upper Agno River Basin Resource Reserve, Mount Pulag National Park, Mount Data National Park and Lower Agno Watershed Forest Reserve.

=== Climate ===
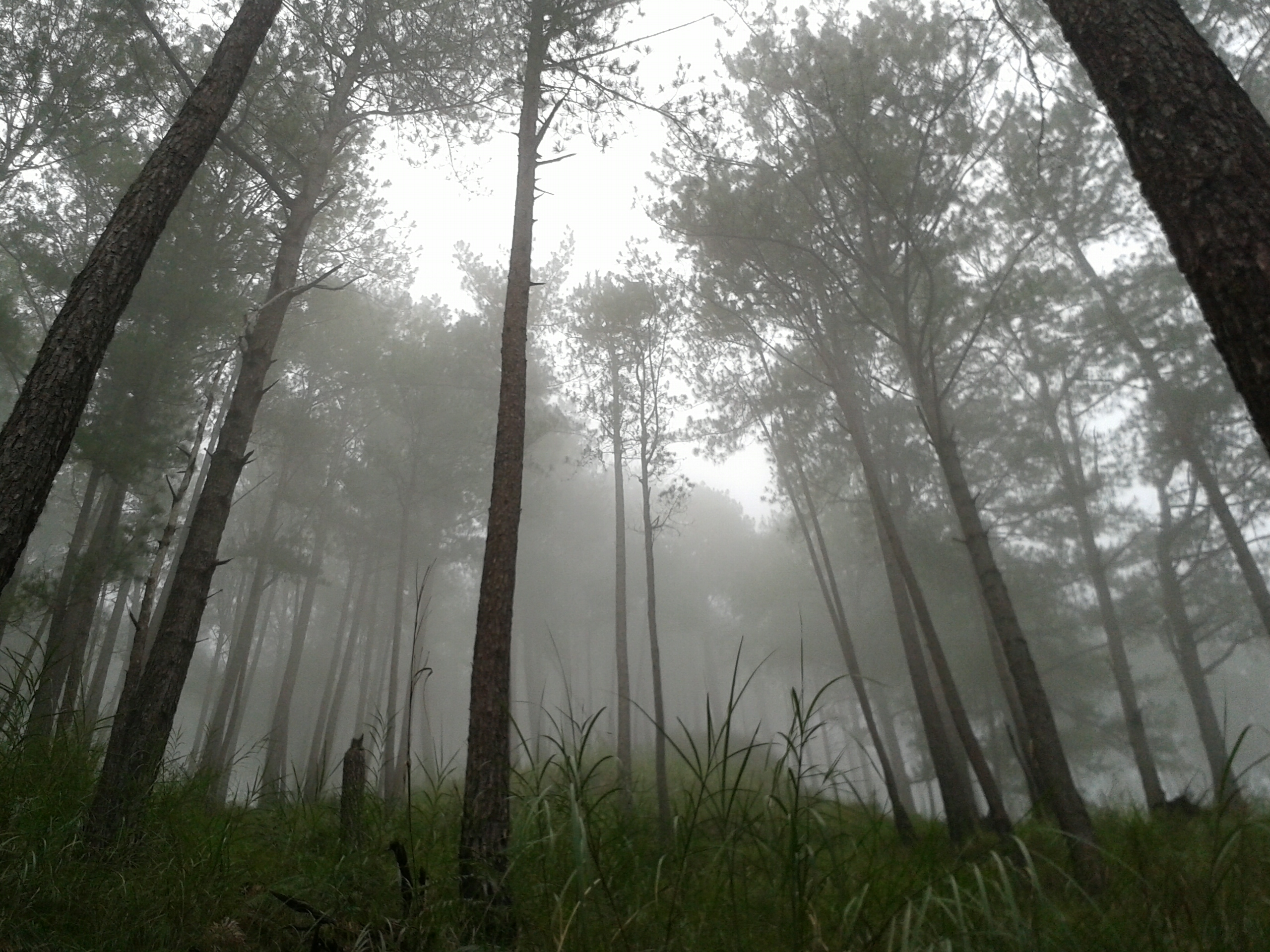
Foggy forest in Benguet

Most of Benguet falls under the subtropical highland climate (Köppen Cwb) zone, experiencing annual average highs of 25.3 °C (77.5 °F) in April and lows of 13.3 °C (55.9 °F) in January.

The province suffers from crop damage resulting from seasonal frost during the cold months of December to March, especially in high-altitude towns such as Atok, Buguias, Mankayan and Kibungan. In February 2007, Benguet suffered crop damage due to temperatures reaching as low as 7 °C (45 °F).

Climate data for Benguet
| Month | Jan | Feb | Mar | Apr | May | Jun | Jul | Aug | Sep | Oct | Nov | Dec | Year |
|---|---|---|---|---|---|---|---|---|---|---|---|---|---|
| Mean daily maximum °C (°F) | 23.1 (73.6) | 23.9 (75.0) | 24.7 (76.5) | 25.3 (77.5) | 24.6 (76.3) | 24.1 (75.4) | 22.9 (73.2) | 22.5 (72.5) | 23 (73) | 23.6 (74.5) | 23.8 (74.8) | 23.3 (73.9) | 23.7 (74.7) |
| Mean daily minimum °C (°F) | 13.3 (55.9) | 13.9 (57.0) | 14.8 (58.6) | 16.2 (61.2) | 16.7 (62.1) | 16.6 (61.9) | 16.4 (61.5) | 16.6 (61.9) | 16.3 (61.3) | 16 (61) | 15.5 (59.9) | 14.2 (57.6) | 15.5 (60.0) |
| Average precipitation mm (inches) | 150.8 (5.94) | 101.8 (4.01) | 82.3 (3.24) | 44.9 (1.77) | 132.5 (5.22) | 146 (5.7) | 196.9 (7.75) | 181.6 (7.15) | 168.5 (6.63) | 199.2 (7.84) | 191.2 (7.53) | 233.7 (9.20) | 1,829.4 (71.98) |
| Average rainy days | 2 | 3 | 6 | 9 | 19 | 21 | 26 | 26 | 23 | 14 | 9 | 5 | 163 |
Source 1: Storm247 (for average temperature and rainy days)
Source 2: WorldWeatherOnline (for average precipitation)

=== Administrative divisions ===
Benguet comprises 13 municipalities, all encompassed by double legislative districts.

The highly urbanized city of Baguio, although administratively independent from Benguet, is situated in the interior of the province, surrounded by the municipalities of La Trinidad, Itogon, Sablan and Tuba. The city used to be part of the province but became independent when the city's charter was enacted in 1909.

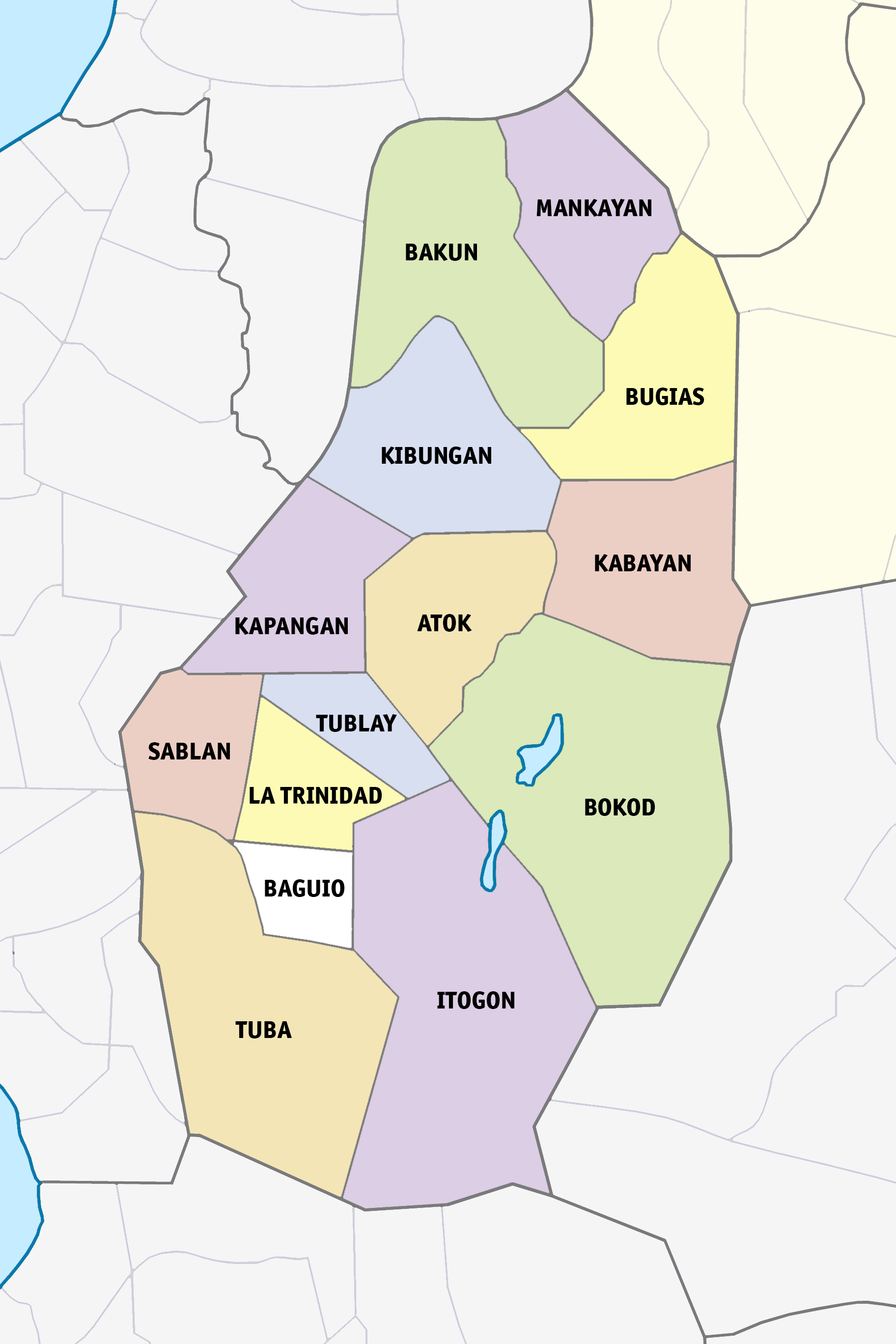
Political map of Benguet (municipalities)

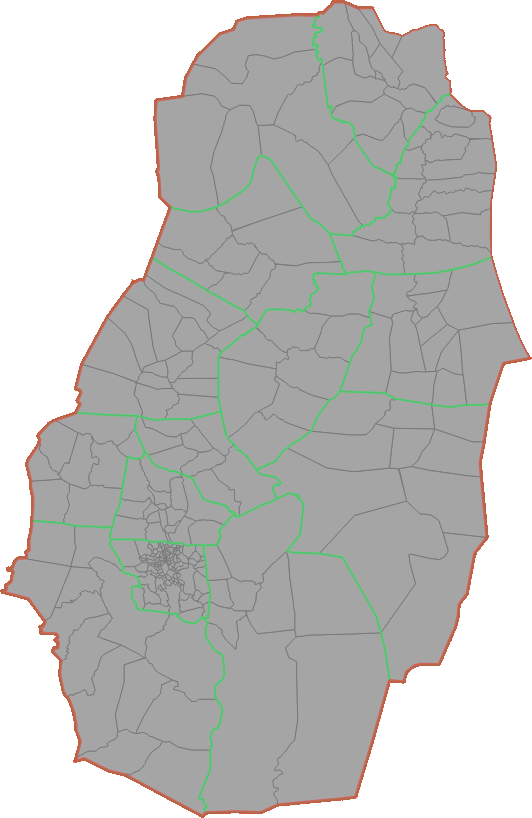
Political map of Benguet (barangays)

| City or municipality (Note: The globe icon marks the city/town center.) | | Population | | | ±% p.a. | Area | | Density | | Barangay |
| | | (2020) | | (2015) | | km^{2} | sq mi | /km^{2} | /sq mi | |
|---|---|---|---|---|---|---|---|---|---|---|
| Atok | | 4.2% | 19,218 | 19,668 | −0.44% | 214.99 | 83.01 | 89 | 230 | 8 |
| Baguio | ‡ | — | 366,358 | 345,366 | +1.13% | 57.51 | 22.20 | 6,400 | 17,000 | 129 |
| Bakun | | 3.2% | 14,535 | 15,357 | −1.04% | 286.91 | 110.78 | 51 | 130 | 7 |
| Bokod | | 3.1% | 14,435 | 13,756 | +0.92% | 274.96 | 106.16 | 52 | 130 | 10 |
| Buguias | | 9.7% | 44,877 | 43,627 | +0.54% | 175.88 | 67.91 | 260 | 670 | 14 |
| Itogon | | 13.3% | 61,498 | 59,820 | +0.53% | 449.73 | 173.64 | 140 | 360 | 9 |
| Kabayan | | 3.4% | 15,806 | 15,260 | +0.67% | 242.69 | 93.70 | 65 | 170 | 13 |
| Kapangan | | 4.2% | 19,297 | 19,361 | −0.06% | 164.39 | 63.47 | 120 | 310 | 15 |
| Kibungan | | 3.7% | 17,051 | 17,292 | −0.27% | 254.86 | 98.40 | 67 | 170 | 7 |
| La Trinidad | † | 29.8% | 137,404 | 129,133 | +1.19% | 70.04 | 27.04 | 2,000 | 5,200 | 16 |
| Mankayan | | 8.1% | 37,233 | 35,953 | +0.67% | 130.48 | 50.38 | 290 | 750 | 12 |
| Sablan | | 2.5% | 11,588 | 11,457 | +0.22% | 105.63 | 40.78 | 110 | 280 | 8 |
| Tuba | | 10.5% | 48,312 | 47,648 | +0.26% | 295.97 | 114.27 | 160 | 410 | 13 |
| Tublay | | 4.2% | 19,429 | 17,892 | +1.58% | 102.55 | 39.59 | 190 | 490 | 8 |
| Total (Note: Total figures exclude the highly urbanized city of Baguio.) | | | 460,683 | 446,224 | +0.61% | 2,769.08 | 1,069.15 | 170 | 440 | 140 |
| | † Capital municipality | | | | | Municipality | | | | |
‡ Highly urbanized city (geographically within but independent from the province)

=== Barangays ===
The 13 municipalities of the province comprise a total of 140 barangays, with Pico in La Trinidad as the most populous in 2010, and Anchokey in Kabayan as the least.

== Demographics ==
The population of Benguet in the 2024 census was 473,190 people, making it the most populous province in the region. It had a density of 170 inhabitants per square kilometre or 440 inhabitants per square mile.

In the May 2000 census, Benguet had a total population of 330,129. This figure is up by 16,296 from 313,833 persons recorded in the 1995 census, giving an annual growth rate of 1.09% during the 5-year period compared to the national average of 2.43%. The province registered 63,123 households, an increase of 4,588 households over the 1990 figure. This gave an average household size of 5.20 persons, slightly higher than the national average of 4.99.

Population census of Benguet

| Year | Pop. | ±% p.a. |
|---|---|---|
| 1903 | 21,697 | — |
| 1918 | 43,601 | +4.76% |
| 1939 | 122,204 | +5.03% |
| 1948 | 110,081 | −1.15% |
| 1960 | 183,657 | +4.36% |
| 1970 | 179,012 | −0.26% |

| Year | Pop. | ±% p.a. |
|---|---|---|
| 1975 | 204,616 | +2.72% |
| 1980 | 235,742 | +2.87% |
| 1990 | 302,715 | +2.53% |
| 1995 | 313,833 | +0.68% |
| 2000 | 330,129 | +1.09% |
| 2007 | 372,533 | +1.68% |

| Year | Pop. | ±% p.a. |
|---|---|---|
| 2010 | 403,944 | +2.99% |
| 2015 | 446,224 | +1.91% |
| 2020 | 460,683 | +0.67% |
| 2024 | 473,190 | +0.65% |

(excluding Baguio)
Source: Philippine Statistics Authority

=== Ethnicity ===
The people of Benguet comprise three main ethnolinguistic groups. Kankanaeys dominate the northwestern municipalities, Ibalois are concentrated on the southeast, and Kalanguyas are mostly found in the east. Migrants from lowland provinces have fused with the local populace to form a melting pot in some areas.

Top 5 Ethnicities in Benguet (2020 Census)
| Rank | Ethnicity | Population | Percentage |
|---|---|---|---|
| 1 | Kankanaey | 213,779 | 46.53% |
| 2 | Ibaloy | 130,134 | 28.32% |
| 3 | Ilocano | 29,960 | 6.52% |
| 4 | Kalanguya | 21,534 | 4.69% |
| 5 | Tagalog | 9,212 | 2.00% |
| | Total Household Population | 459,468 | |

Ilokanos, particularly doctors, teachers, businessmen and public servants arrived during the American period for the improvement of the health condition and for the education of the people. The pioneer Ilocanos helped establish La Trinidad as a commercial and political center.This resulted in an improved healthcare, education and economic life of the people' lives. It also established a closer ties between the Ilocanos and the Cordillerans.

=== Languages ===
Benguet residents generally speak their own languages in addition to Ilocano, Tagalog, and English, which are used for trade and commerce. The Ibaloi tribe speak Ibaloi, which is similar to Pangasinan, while the Kankanaey have their own eponymous language, which is related to the Bontoc language.

The SIL Ethnologue database classifies the languages under the South-Central Cordilleran branch. Nabaloy (named in the database as Ibaloi) is part of the Southern Cordilleran branch which also includes Pangasinense. The Kankanaey language is under the Central Cordilleran branch, which also includes Bontoc and Ifugao.

=== Religion ===
Religious breakdown in Benguet
1. Roman Catholicism (59.0%)
2. Protestantism (33.0%)
3. Iglesia ni Cristo (4.00%)
4. Other (4.00%)

Roman Catholicism is the predominant religion with 59% adherence, Other groups such as Members Church of God International (MCG), Protestants, especially Anglicans, Methodists, Baptists, and Evangelicals, form about 33% of the population, while the Iglesia ni Cristo forms about 7%. There is also small community of Muslims (0.472% of the province population).

== Economy ==
Poverty incidence of Benguet (%)

Source: Philippine Statistics Authority

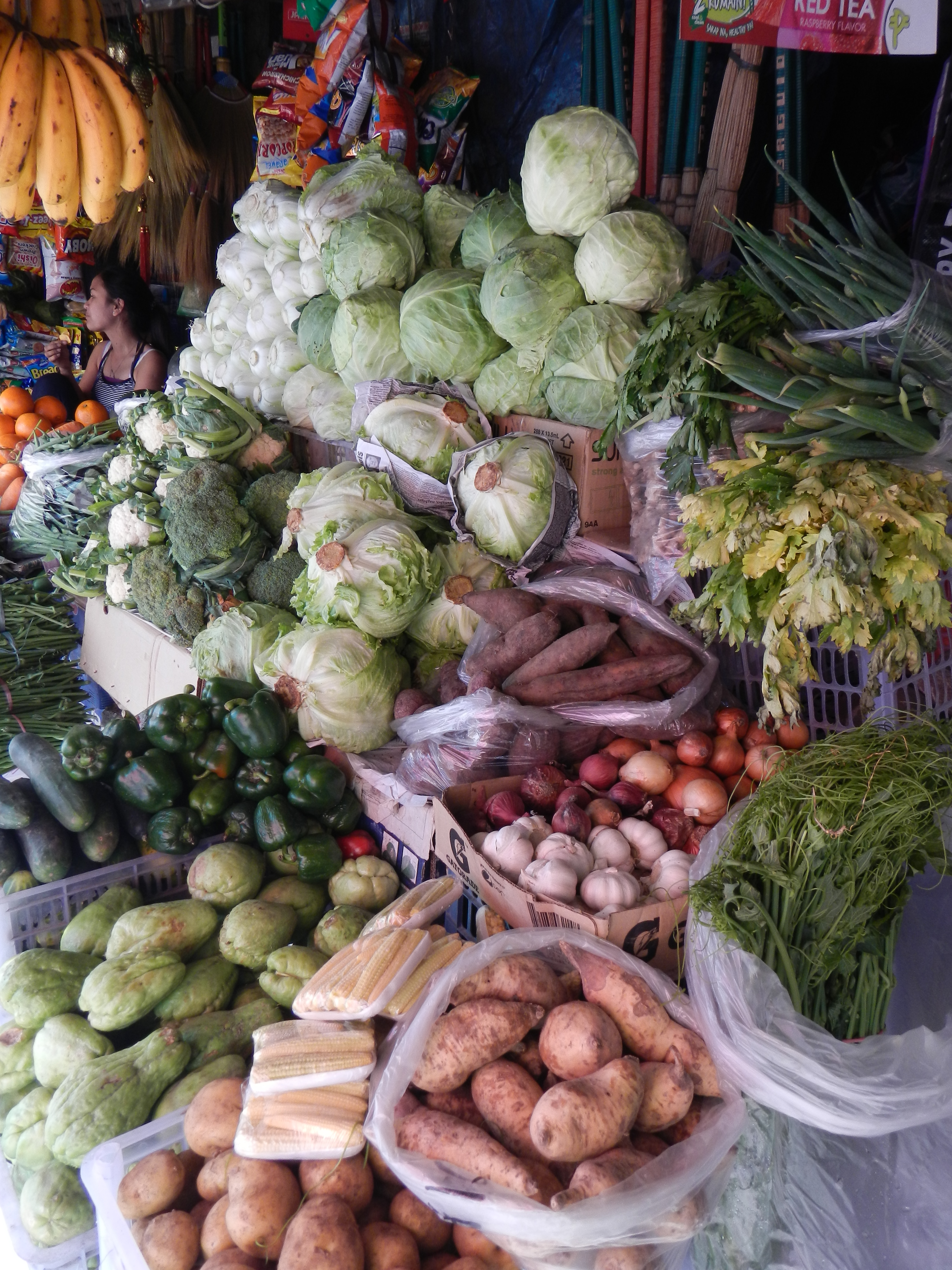
Benguet is a major producer of highland vegetables in the country.

Agriculture, mining, and tourism are the major industries in Benguet. Its cool climate and high altitude has made it an ideal place for producing highland vegetables. Benguet is often called the Salad Bowl of the Philippines. The La Trinidad Vegetable Trading Post in the capital town of La Trinidad serves as the hub of vegetable trading in the province, attracting farmers, merchants and traders from the local community and the Philippines' different provinces. Major crops produced which include potatoes, Baguio beans, peas, strawberries, cabbage, broccoli, cauliflower, lettuce, sayote and carrots are shipped throughout the country.

Horticulture and floriculture are practiced in the province. The province supplies flowers to the different municipalities, including Baguio, as well as to Metro Manila, including other parts of Luzon, Visayas and Mindanao. Roses are produced, particularly in Barangay Bahong in La Trinidad, earning the barangay the title Rose Capital of the Philippines. Apisang (scientific name: Pittosporum resiniferum), a plant endemic to the Philippines (as well as Malaysia), is grown in the municipalities of Kapangan and Kibungan as a potential alternative source of fuel and energy, rivaling the jatropha biofuel plant.

Other agricultural-related activities are monggo processing, fruit preservation, peanut brittle manufacturing, broom making and basket weaving.

Mining is a major industry in Benguet, which is one of the country's leading gold producers. The Benguet Corporation, the first and oldest mining company in the Philippines, has extracted gold, copper and chromite in Itogon since 1903.

Other mineral deposits are silver, copper, pyrite, and limestone. Silver smithing is a large industry in Benguet, and many entrepreneurs sell silver works at lower prices in Baguio compared to Manila. In 2006, revenues from mining reached 4 billion pesos from just two (Lepanto Consolidated Mining Corporation and Philex Mines) of many mining firms operating in the province. The province's mining vigor has never translated into better quality of life of the Benguet people, simply because a bulk of the mining firm's taxes are not paid directly to the province. The two mining corporations, like many others around the country, have principal offices in the City of Makati, a set-up that makes Makati the prime mining tax beneficiary.

The location of Baguio within Benguet draws many tourists from the lowlands. Often, people who go to Baguio also explore the province, especially the strawberry fields in La Trinidad.

== Government ==
Current Provincial Government Officials (2025-2028)

- Governor: Melchor D. Diclas (Lakas)
- Vice-Governor: Marie Rose Fongwan-Kepes (Lakas)

Sangguniang Panlalawigan Members:

1st District:

- Alexander T. Fianza (Lakas)
- Johannes A. Amuasen (Lakas)
- Lady Charmaine S. Molintas-Likigan (Lakas)
- Thomas K. Wales Jr. (UBP)

2nd District:

- Ruben L Tinda-an (Lakas)
- Romeo K. Salda (Lakas)
- Manny E. Fermin (Lakas)
- Armando I. Lauro (Lakas)
- Neptali B. Camsol (Lakas)
- Jim G. Botiwey (PFP)

Ex-Officio Members:

- Oliver Paus (President, LNB)
- TBD (President, PCL)
- Meica Cayat (President, Panlalawigang Pederasyon ng Sangguniang Kabataan)
- Benjamin Palbusa (Representative, IPMR)

=== House of Representatives ===
| District | Representative | Party | Term | Bloc |
|---|---|---|---|---|
| Lone | Eric G. Yap | Lakas | 2 | Majority |

== Tourism ==
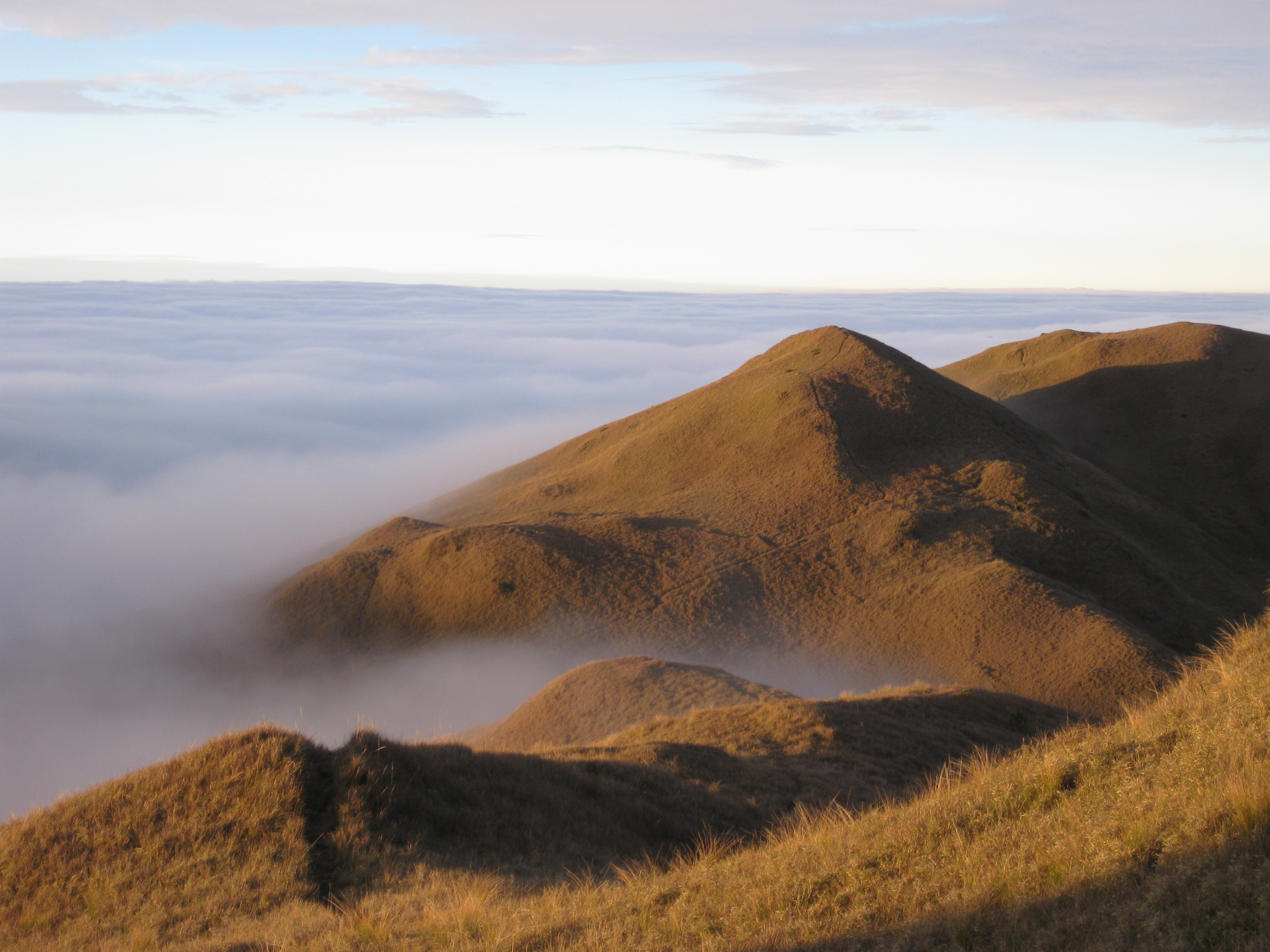
Mount Pulag sea of clouds

The province is a major tourist destination in the country, with most of its tourist spots centered on culture and nature. Baguio's location within the province provides a boost to the tourism industry of the province. Notable interesting places in the province include Mount Pulag along Kabayan, Kennon Road in Tuba, Ambuklao Dam in Bokod, Binga Dam in Itogon, strawberry and flower farms in La Trinidad, and the Palina and Naguey rice terraces in Atok.

Tuba and Tublay hot springs are usually flocked by local tourists from the neighboring provinces. Vegetable terraces can be seen along the Halsema Highway, especially during the growing season. Kabayan is known for its centuries-old mummies, while Buguias is visited for its hot springs and the Apo Anno.

== Education ==
Higher education in the province is centered in the capital town of La Trinidad, which houses the Main Campus of the only university in Benguet, the Benguet State University (BSU). The university has two satellite campuses in two municipalities; the Buguias Campus at Loo, Buguias, and the Bokod Campus at Ambangeg, Bokod.

Other educational institutions which include Advocates Academic College, BVS Colleges, Cordillera Career Development College, King's College of the Philippines, Philippine College of Ministry, Philippine Nazarene College, as well as the Cordillera Regional Science High School, the Benguet National High School (with several annexes) and the Benguet SPED Center are also situated within La Trinidad.

The independent chartered city of Baguio hosts several higher education institutions, which include most notably the University of the Philippines Baguio, Saint Louis University, University of the Cordilleras (formerly Baguio Colleges Foundation), University of Baguio, Pines City Colleges, Baguio Central University, and Baguio School of Business and Technology, attracting students from across the Philippines.

== Notable people ==
=== Within the province's jurisdiction ===
- Deodato Arellano – a Filipino patriot and one of the founders of the Katipunan (La Trinidad)

== See also ==
- Merrittia benguetensis Merr., plant named after the province.
