= Buguias =

Municipality in Benguet, Philippines

- Municipality
- Municipality of Buguias
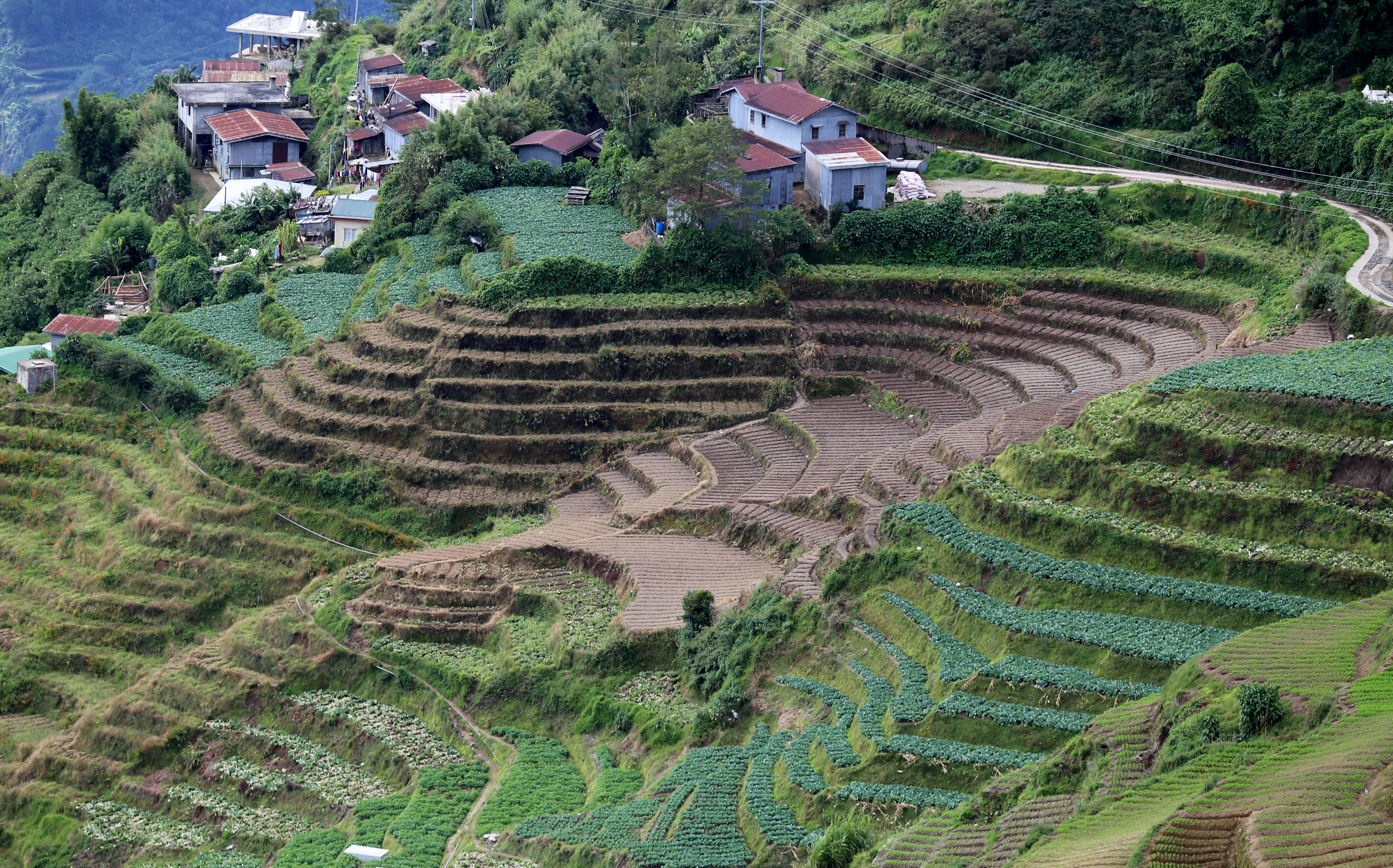
- Houses near rice terraces in Buguias

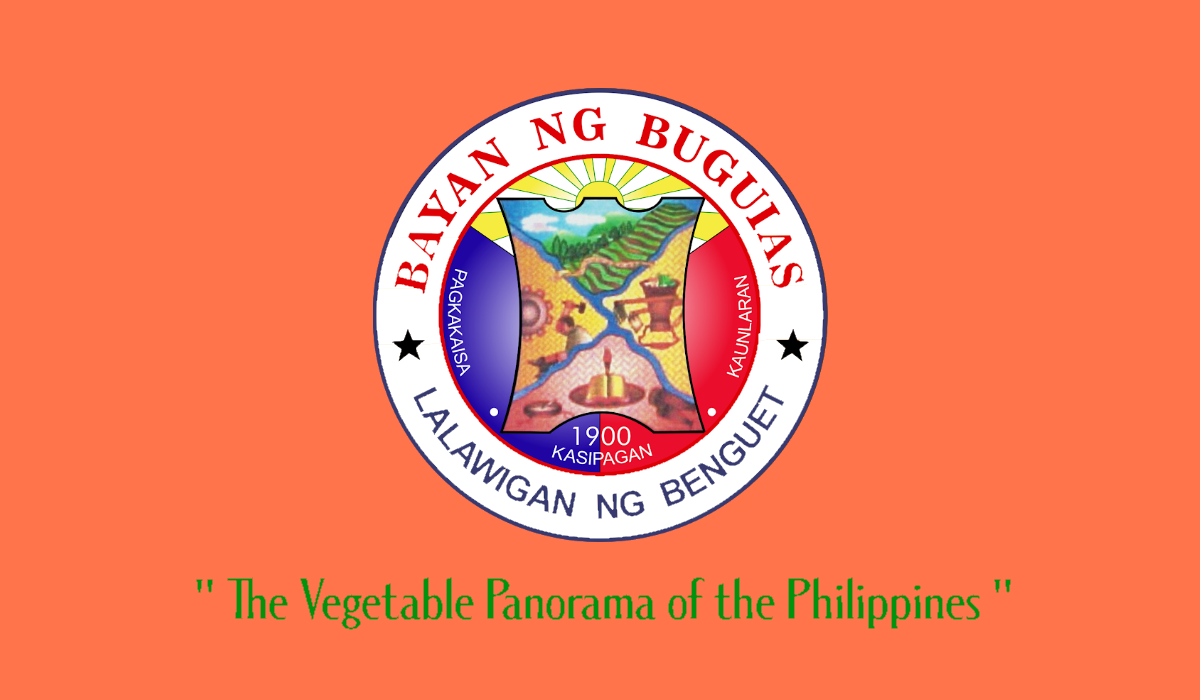
- Flag Seal
- Nickname: The Vegetable Panorama of the Philippines
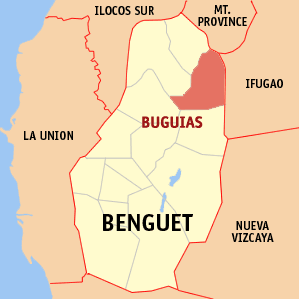
- Map of Benguet with Buguias highlighted
- Interactive map of Buguias
- Location within the Philippines
- Coordinates: 16°48′12″N 120°49′16″E
- Country: Philippines
- Region: Cordillera Administrative Region
- Province: Benguet
- District: Lone district
- Founded: February 9, 1942
- Barangays: 14 (see Barangays)

Government
  - Type: Sangguniang Bayan
  - Mayor: Julius M. Amos
  - Vice Mayor: Ronald C. Kimakim
  - Representative: Eric Go Yap
  - Municipal Council: Members: Manuel G. Yans; Melchor C. Guesey; Jerahmeel B. Lasegan; Jose G. Bayas Jr.; Glenn A. Bigo; Federico G. Aquisio; Vicente B. Kitongan; Wilnard "Aylabyu" E. Tolida
  - Electorate: 25,076 voters (2025)

Area
  - Total: 175.88 km^{2} (67.91 sq mi)
- Elevation: 1,684 m (5,525 ft)
- Highest elevation: 2,342 m (7,684 ft)
- Lowest elevation: 1,129 m (3,704 ft)

Population (2024 census)
  - Total: 45,703
  - Density: 259.85/km^{2} (673.02/sq mi)
  - Households: 11,937

Economy
  - Income class: 1st municipal income class
  - Poverty incidence: 8.27% (2023)
  - Revenue: ₱ 293.2 million (2024)
  - Assets: ₱ 8,217 million (2024)
  - Expenditure: ₱ 170.3 million (2024)
  - Liabilities: ₱ 52.02 million (2024)

Service provider
  - Electricity: Benguet Electric Cooperative (BENECO)
- Time zone: UTC+8 (PST)
- ZIP code: 2607
- PSGC: 1401105000
- IDD : area code: +63 (0)74
- Native languages: Kankanaey; Ibaloi; Ilocano; Tagalog
- Website: www.buguias.gov.ph

Buguias, officially the Municipality of Buguias, (Ilocano: Ili ti Buguias; Tagalog: Bayan ng Buguias), is a municipality in the province of Benguet, Philippines. According to the 2024 census, it has a population of 45,703 people.

The municipality is home to the mummy of Apo Anno, one of the most revered and important folk hero in Benguet prior to Spanish arrival.

== Etymology ==
According to folklore, Buguias got its name from the word bugas (or begas) which means "rice".

Another version of its origin would be an Igorot settlement during the pre-Spanish time called Bogey-yas, which was modernized and spelled as Buguias by Spanish authorities.

== History ==
=== Pre-colonial era ===
Nabalicong village in Barangay Natubleng was the center of the area's cultural and political domains prior to Spanish colonization. In the 12th century, a folk hero, known as Apo Anno, lived with the people of the area and was a spiritual leader, hunter, and demigod. The people believed Apo Anno was a son of a Benguet goddess. His body was filled with tattoos, symbolizing his high status in the community. During his protectorate of the domain, prosperity spurred. He died before the arrival of the Spaniards, and thus, was given mummification and death rites in the traditional way.

=== Spanish period ===
The arrival of Spanish colonizers in Buguias were primarily due to the construction of Spanish trails leading to the mountain region. Buguias and Loo were two separate rancherias during the Spanish Regime.

=== American period ===
During the American rule, Buguias was established as one of the 19 townships of the province of Benguet, upon the issuance of Act No. 48 by the Philippine Commission on November 22, 1900.

On November 23, 1900, the township of Loo was abolished and integrated into the township of Buguias with the issuance of Act No. 49. On August 13, 1908, Benguet was established as a sub-province of the newly created Mountain Province with the enactment of Act No. 1876. As a result, six townships of Benguet were abolished, but Buguias remained a constituent town of Benguet sub-province.

In 1918, the mummy of Apo Anno was stolen by foreign treasure hunters. An earthquake and pestilence followed afterwards, prompting the people to campaign for the return of Apo Anno to his resting place.

=== Post-war era ===
On June 25, 1963, President Diosdado Macapagal issued Executive Order No. 42 converting eight (8) of the thirteen (13) towns (designated as municipal districts) of Benguet sub-province into regular municipalities. Buguias was among them.

On June 18, 1966, the sub-province of Benguet was separated from the old Mountain Province and was converted into a regular province. Buguias remained to be a component municipality of the newly established province.

=== Contemporary era ===
In 1984, a Filipino antique collector bought an auctioned mummy, only to discover it was the mummy of Apo Anno. He donated it to the National Museum of the Philippines afterwards for better care of the national treasure. The people of Buguias made diplomatic channels with the National Museum until it was agreed that the National Museum would return the mummy of Apo Anno to its resting place in barangay Nabalicong after Benguet officials agreed to install iron grills in the burial cave and provide funds for its upkeep. Later that year, Apo Anno was returned to its burial cave, through elaborate death rituals last performed in the 16th century and a hero's homecoming conducted by the people of Buguias.

There have been scholars campaigning for the declaration of Apo Anno's mummy and resting place as a collective National Treasure or Important Cultural Property of the Philippines.

== Geography ==
Buguias is located at 16°48′12″N 120°49′16″E, at the northeastern section of Benguet. It is bounded by Mankayan on the north-west, Bakun on the mid-west, Kibungan on the south-west, Kabayan on the south, Tinoc on the east, Hungduan on the north-east, and Bauko on the north.

According to the Philippine Statistics Authority, the municipality has a land area of 175.88 square kilometres (67.91 sq mi) constituting 6.35% of the 2,769.08-square-kilometre- (1,069.15 sq mi) total area of Benguet.

Buguias is situated 76.72 kilometres (47.67 mi) from the provincial capital La Trinidad, and 329.66 kilometres (204.84 mi) from the country's capital city of Manila.

=== Barangays ===
Buguias is politically subdivided into 14 barangays. Each barangay consists of puroks and some have sitios.

PSGC	Barangay	Population			±% p.a.	
		2024		2010		
141105001	Abatan	7.8%	3,548	2,780	▴	1.70%
141105002	Amgaleyguey	6.9%	3,139	3,538	▾	−0.82%
141105003	Amlimay	5.1%	2,347	2,197	▴	0.46%
141105004	Baculongan Norte	6.5%	2,974	2,157	▴	2.24%
141105014	Baculongan Sur	8.1%	3,698	3,169	▴	1.07%
141105006	Bangao	11.6%	5,319	4,269	▴	1.53%
141105007	Buyacaoan	8.5%	3,884	3,160	▴	1.43%
141105008	Calamagan	2.0%	931	739	▴	1.60%
141105009	Catlubong	7.4%	3,369	2,758	▴	1.39%
141105015	Lengaoan	4.6%	2,092	1,488	▴	2.38%
141105010	Loo	10.7%	4,881	4,388	▴	0.74%
141105012	Natubleng	6.0%	2,746	2,513	▴	0.61%
141105013	Poblacion (Central)	6.8%	3,108	3,472	▾	−0.76%
141105016	Sebang	6.2%	2,841	2,643	▴	0.50%
	Total		45,703	44,877	▴	0.13%

=== Climate ===
Climate data for Buguias, Benguet
Month	Jan	Feb	Mar	Apr	May	Jun	Jul	Aug	Sep	Oct	Nov	Dec	Year
Mean daily maximum °C (°F)	19 (66)	20 (68)	22 (72)	23 (73)	23 (73)	22 (72)	21 (70)	21 (70)	21 (70)	21 (70)	21 (70)	19 (66)	21 (70)
Mean daily minimum °C (°F)	12 (54)	12 (54)	14 (57)	15 (59)	17 (63)	17 (63)	17 (63)	17 (63)	16 (61)	15 (59)	14 (57)	13 (55)	15 (59)
Average precipitation mm (inches)	38 (1.5)	57 (2.2)	77 (3.0)	141 (5.6)	390 (15.4)	355 (14.0)	426 (16.8)	441 (17.4)	426 (16.8)	259 (10.2)	97 (3.8)	57 (2.2)	2,764 (108.9)
Average rainy days	10.4	12.1	15.4	20.4	26.7	27.1	28.7	28.0	26.4	19.9	14.1	12.3	241.5
Source: Meteoblue

== Demographics ==
Population census of Buguias
Year	Pop.	±% p.a.
1903	10	—
1918	2,611	+44.92%
1939	5,691	+3.78%
1948	5,894	+0.39%
1960	8,658	+3.26%
1970	12,402	+3.65%
1975	15,142	+4.08%
1980	17,509	+2.95%
1990	25,236	+3.72%
1995	28,034	+1.99%
2000	33,177	+3.68%
2007	34,507	+0.54%
2010	39,271	+4.82%
2015	43,627	+2.02%
2020	44,877	+0.60%
2024	45,703	+0.44%
Source: Philippine Statistics Authority

In the 2024 census, Buguias had a population of 45,703 people. The population density was 260 inhabitants per square kilometre (670/sq mi).

== Economy ==
Poverty incidence of Buguias (%)

Source: Philippine Statistics Authority

Buguias is primarily an agricultural town. It is one of the leading producers of highland vegetables, especially carrots, in the province of Benguet.

Most of the vegetables produced in the town are sold at the La Trinidad Vegetable Trading Post or are marketed to other parts of the country.

== Government ==
=== Local government ===
Buguias, belonging to the lone congressional district of the province of Benguet, is governed by a mayor designated as its local chief executive and by a municipal council as its legislative body in accordance with the Local Government Code. The mayor, vice mayor, and the councilors are elected directly by the people through an election which is being held every three years.

=== Elected officials ===
Members of the Municipal Council (2025-2028)
Position	Name
Congressman	Eric Go Yap
Mayor	Julius M. Amos
Vice-Mayor	Ronald C. Kimakim
Councilors	Manuel G. Yans
Councilors	Melchor C. Guesey
Councilors	Jerahmeel B. Lasegan
Councilors	Jose G. Bayas Jr.
Councilors	Glenn A. Bigo
Councilors	Federico G. Aquisio
Councilors	Vicente B. Kitongan
Councilors	Wilnard "Aylabyu" E. Tolida

== Education ==
The Buguias Schools District Office governs all educational institutions within the municipality. It oversees the management and operations of all private and public, from primary to secondary schools.

=== Public schools ===
As of 2014, Buguias has 43 public elementary schools and 6 public secondary schools.

Elementary (2013-2014)
School	Barangay
Abatan Elementary School	Abatan
Alapang Elementary School	Sebang
Ambanglo Primary School	Catlubong
Amgaleyguey Primary School	Amgaleyguey
Amlimay Elementary School	Amlimay
Bacasen-Wakit Primary School	Sebang
Bad-ayan Elementary School	Baculongan Sur
Bangao Elementary School - Poway Annex	Bangao
Bangsalan-Daganos Primary School	(Bangsalan)
Bano-oy Elementary School	Baculongan Norte
Bayoyo-Lukingan-Awal Elementary School	Buyacaoan
Bekes Elementary School	Buyacaoan
Bot-oan Elementary School	Catlubong
Buguias Central School	Poblacion
Buyacaoan Elementary School	Buyacaoan
Cabuguiasan Primary School	Natubleng
Calamagan Primary School	Calamagan
Catlubong-Adiston Elementary School	Catlubong
Cayapas Elementary School	Baculongan Sur
Cotcot-Talabis Elementary School	Bangao
Deccan Primary School	Baculongan Sur
Guioeng Elementary School	Amlimay
Kayang Primary School	Poblacion
Kimpit Primary School	Amlimay
Laduan Primary School	Lengaoan
Lam-ayan Elementary School	Bangao
Lengaoan-Waking Elementary School	Lengaoan
Loo Elementary School	Loo
Nabalicong Saltin Elementary School	Natubleng
Natubleng Elementary School	Natubleng
Naytokyab Elementary School	Poblacion
Orlani Telitel Primary School	Baculongan Sur
Paing Elementary School	Baculongan Sur
Pan-ayaoan Elementary School	Loo
Pasbol-Belino Elementary School	Sebang
Pugo James Mocate Elementary School	Baculongan Norte
Saclalan Sagandoy Elementary School	Amgaleyguey
Sagandoy Elementary School	Amgaleyguey
Sinipsip Elementary School	Amgaleyguey
Taba-ao Primary School	Loo
Tin-apan Primary School	Bangao
Tindo-Bosania Primary School	Bangao
Tonglo-Cariño Primary School	Amlimay

Secondary (2013-2014)
School	Barangay
Bangao National High School	Bangao
Buguias National High School	Poblacion
Catlubong National High School	Catlubong
Loo National High School	Loo
Sinipsip National High School	Amgaleyguey
Sinipsip National High School - Natubleng Extension	Natubleng

== Historical markers and shrine ==
=== Veteran Memorial Marker ===
The Veteran Memorial Marker marks the liberation of Abatan and Buguias on July 27, 1945, that was fought between the Japanese Imperial Army and the combined Filipino and American ground troops. Through municipal council resolution No. 19, July 27, 1945, was declared as the Liberation Day and local holiday in the municipality. Festivals during this date include parades, programs and wreath-laying.

=== World War II 66th Infantry Shrine ===
The World War II 66th Infantry Shrine monument, located in Lengaoan along Halsema Highway, symbolizes the bravery of the combined Filipino and American soldiers who stood their ground defending the area and firing their cannons against the Japanese forces.

=== Burial Site of Apo Anno ===
The 12th century burial site, which was later used again for Apo Anno's reburial in 1999, is one of the most important cultural sites in Benguet. The burial site is home to the mummy of one of Benguet's folk heroes whose remains are still preserved in present time.
