= Sablan, Benguet =

Municipality in Benguet, Philippines

Sablan
- Municipality
- Municipality of Sablan
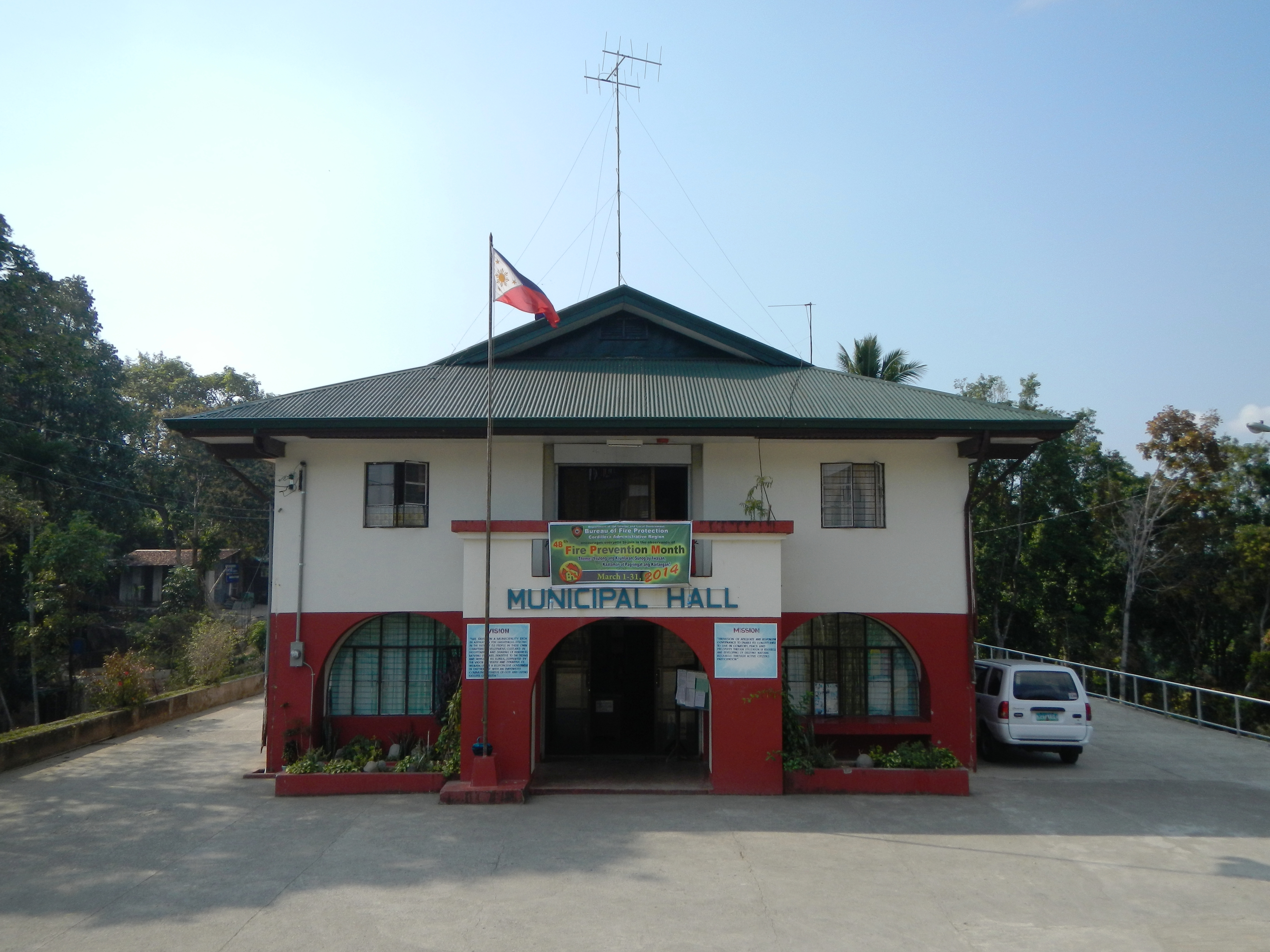
- Sablan Municipal Hall

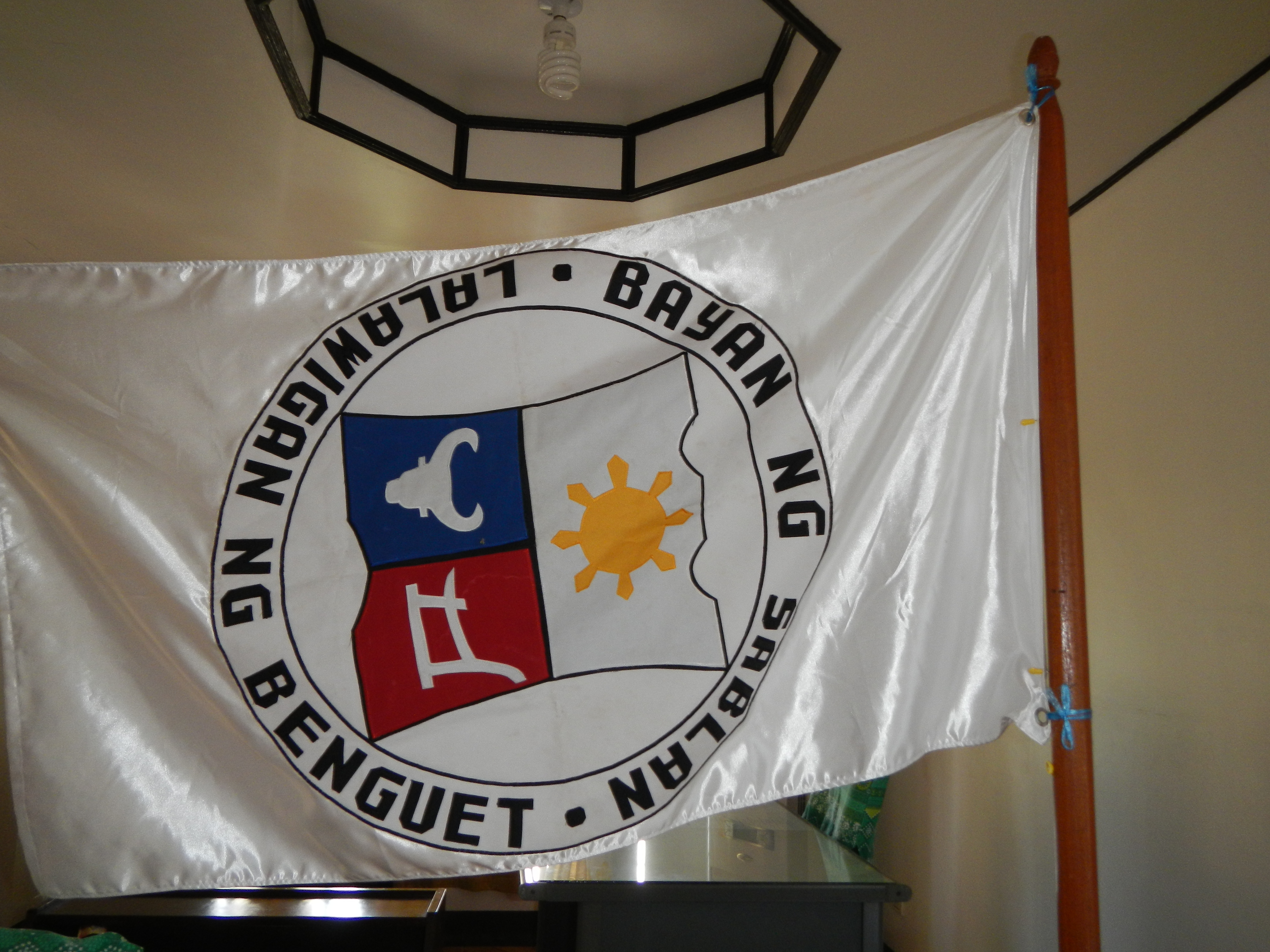
- Flag Seal

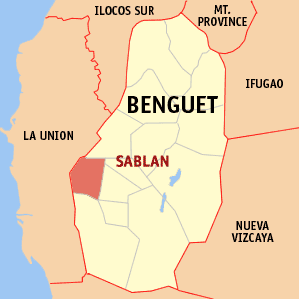
- Map of Benguet with Sablan highlighted
- Interactive map of Sablan
- Location within the Philippines
- Coordinates: 16°29′48″N 120°29′15″E
- Country: Philippines
- Region: Cordillera Administrative Region
- Province: Benguet
- District: Lone district
- Barangays: 8 (see Barangays)

Government
  - Type: Sangguniang Bayan
  - Mayor: Alfredo B. Dacumos Jr.
  - Vice Mayor: Arthur C. Baldo
  - Representative: Eric Go Yap
  - Municipal Council: Members: Leonardo L. Lawana; Herminigildo L. Ome; Romeo P. Amboy; Cornelio I. Almacen; Johnny C. Cutay; Ireneo C. Baldo; Harold H. Busoy; Arthur F. De Leon
  - Electorate: 8,088 voters (2025)

Area
  - Total: 105.63 km^{2} (40.78 sq mi)
- Elevation: 497 m (1,631 ft)
- Highest elevation: 1,117 m (3,665 ft)
- Lowest elevation: 51 m (167 ft)

Population (2024 census)
  - Total: 12,436
  - Density: 117.73/km^{2} (304.92/sq mi)
  - Households: 2,819

Economy
  - Income class: 4th municipal income class
  - Poverty incidence: 5% (2023)
  - Revenue: ₱ 118.2 million (2024)
  - Assets: ₱ 229.2 million (2024)
  - Expenditure: ₱ 103.7 million (2024)
  - Liabilities: ₱ 334.6 million (2024)

Service provider
  - Electricity: Benguet Electric Cooperative (BENECO)
- Time zone: UTC+8 (PST)
- ZIP code: 2614
- PSGC: 1401112000
- IDD : area code: +63 (0)74
- Native languages: Kankanaey; Ibaloi; Ilocano; Tagalog

Sablan, officially the Municipality of Sablan (Ilocano: Ili ti Sablan; Tagalog: Bayan ng Sablan), is a municipality in the province of Benguet, Philippines. According to the 2024 census, it has a population of 12,436 people.

== Etymology ==
The term "Sablan" was derived from the local word "Sabdang", a local tree which thrived in the area.

== History ==
Shikis Banangan Shrine

Sablan was created officially as a municipal district on July 1, 1927, under Executive Order No. 61 dated May 17, 1927 by then American Governor General Leonard Wood.

== Geography ==
The Municipality of Sablan is at the mid-western tip of Benguet. It is bounded by Kapangan on the north, Tublay on the northeast, La Trinidad on the east, Baguio in the southeast, Tuba in the south, Aringay on the southwest, and Burgos to the west.

According to the Philippine Statistics Authority, the municipality has a land area of 105.63 square kilometres (40.78 sq mi) constituting 3.81% of the 2,769.08-square-kilometre- (1,069.15 sq mi) total area of Benguet.

Sablan is situated 22.62 kilometres (14.06 mi) from the provincial capital La Trinidad, and 258.68 kilometres (160.74 mi) from the country's capital city of Manila.

=== Barangays ===
Sablan is politically subdivided into 8 barangays. Each barangay consists of puroks and some have sitios.

PSGC	Barangay	Population			±% p.a.	
		2024		2010		
141112002	Bagong	5.8%	719	764	▾	−0.42%
141112003	Balluay	5.4%	667	507	▴	1.90%
141112004	Banangan	16.0%	1,994	1,756	▴	0.88%
141112005	Banengbeng	7.1%	889	1,108	▾	−1.50%
141112006	Bayabas	19.8%	2,465	2,068	▴	1.21%
141112007	Kamog	12.0%	1,488	1,064	▴	2.33%
141112010	Pappa	5.0%	624	594	▴	0.34%
141112011	Poblacion	22.0%	2,742	2,650	▴	0.23%
	Total		12,436	11,588	▴	0.49%

=== Climate ===
Climate data for Sablan, Benguet
Month	Jan	Feb	Mar	Apr	May	Jun	Jul	Aug	Sep	Oct	Nov	Dec	Year
Mean daily maximum °C (°F)	22 (72)	23 (73)	24 (75)	25 (77)	24 (75)	23 (73)	21 (70)	21 (70)	21 (70)	22 (72)	23 (73)	22 (72)	23 (73)
Mean daily minimum °C (°F)	12 (54)	12 (54)	14 (57)	16 (61)	17 (63)	16 (61)	16 (61)	16 (61)	16 (61)	15 (59)	14 (57)	12 (54)	15 (59)
Average precipitation mm (inches)	15 (0.6)	16 (0.6)	24 (0.9)	33 (1.3)	102 (4.0)	121 (4.8)	177 (7.0)	165 (6.5)	144 (5.7)	170 (6.7)	56 (2.2)	23 (0.9)	1,046 (41.2)
Average rainy days	6.3	6.6	9.5	12.8	20.6	23.5	25.4	23.4	23.2	21.4	14.0	8.2	194.9
Source: Meteoblue

== Demographics ==
Population census of Sablan
Year	Pop.	±% p.a.
1939	2,930	—
1948	2,786	−0.56%
1960	4,741	+4.53%
1970	5,681	+1.82%
1975	7,345	+5.29%
1980	7,900	+1.47%
1990	8,440	+0.66%
1995	9,170	+1.57%
2000	9,652	+1.10%
2007	10,890	+1.68%
2010	10,511	−1.28%
2015	11,457	+1.65%
2020	11,588	+0.24%
2024	12,436	+1.71%
Source: Philippine Statistics Authority

In the 2024 census, Sablan had a population of 12,436 people. The population density was 120 inhabitants per square kilometre (310/sq mi).

== Economy ==
Poverty incidence of Sablan (%)

Source: Philippine Statistics Authority

Agriculture remains the primary source of economy in Sablan. Sablan grows tropical fruits like bananas, pineapples, and mangoes, alongside root crops, coffee, and vegetables. Sablan is one of the municipalities in Benguet that makes broom making an important industry.

Sablan is part of the Metro Baguio, alongside the city of Baguio, La Trinidad, Itogon, Tuba, and Tublay.

== Government ==
=== Local government ===
Sablan, belonging to the lone congressional district of the province of Benguet, is governed by a mayor designated as its local chief executive and by a municipal council as its legislative body in accordance with the Local Government Code. The mayor, vice mayor, and the councilors are elected directly by the people through an election which is being held every three years.

=== Elected officials ===
Members of the Municipal Council (2025-2028)
Position	Name
Congressman	Eric G. Yap
Mayor	Alfredo B. Dacumos Jr.
Vice-Mayor	Arthur C. Baldo
Councilors	Leonardo L. Lawana
Councilors	Herminigildo L. Ome
Councilors	Romeo P. Amboy
Councilors	Cornelio I. Almacen
Councilors	Johnny C. Cutay
Councilors	Ireneo C. Baldo
Councilors	Harold H. Busoy
Councilors	Arthur F. De Leon

== Education ==
The Sablan Schools District Office governs all educational institutions within the municipality. It oversees the management and operations of all private and public, from primary to secondary schools.

=== Public schools ===
As of 2014, Sablan has 14 public elementary schools and 2 public secondary schools.

Elementary (2013-2014)
School	Barangay
Amsalsal Primary School	Banengbeng
Bayabas MG School	Bayabas
Ebbes Elementary School	Banengbeng
Jose Gonzales Elementary School	Bagong
Mating Mang-osan Elementary School	Banangan
Michael G. Angel Elementary School	Kamog
Omas Ampaguey Elementary School	Balluay
Palali Elementary School	Poblacion
Pappa MG School	Pappa
Sa'dul Primary School	Bagong
Sablan Central School	Poblacion
Talete MG School	Bayabas
Taya MG School	Pappa
Yabyabuan MG School	Bagong

Secondary (2013-2014)
School	Barangay
Sablan National High School	Kamog
Sablan National High School - Balluay Extension	Balluay

=== Private schools ===
Saint Louis School of Sablan is the only private secondary school in the municipality, located at Barangay Poblacion.

== Transportation ==
A major road within Sablan include Naguilian Road (formerly Quirino Highway).

== Gallery ==
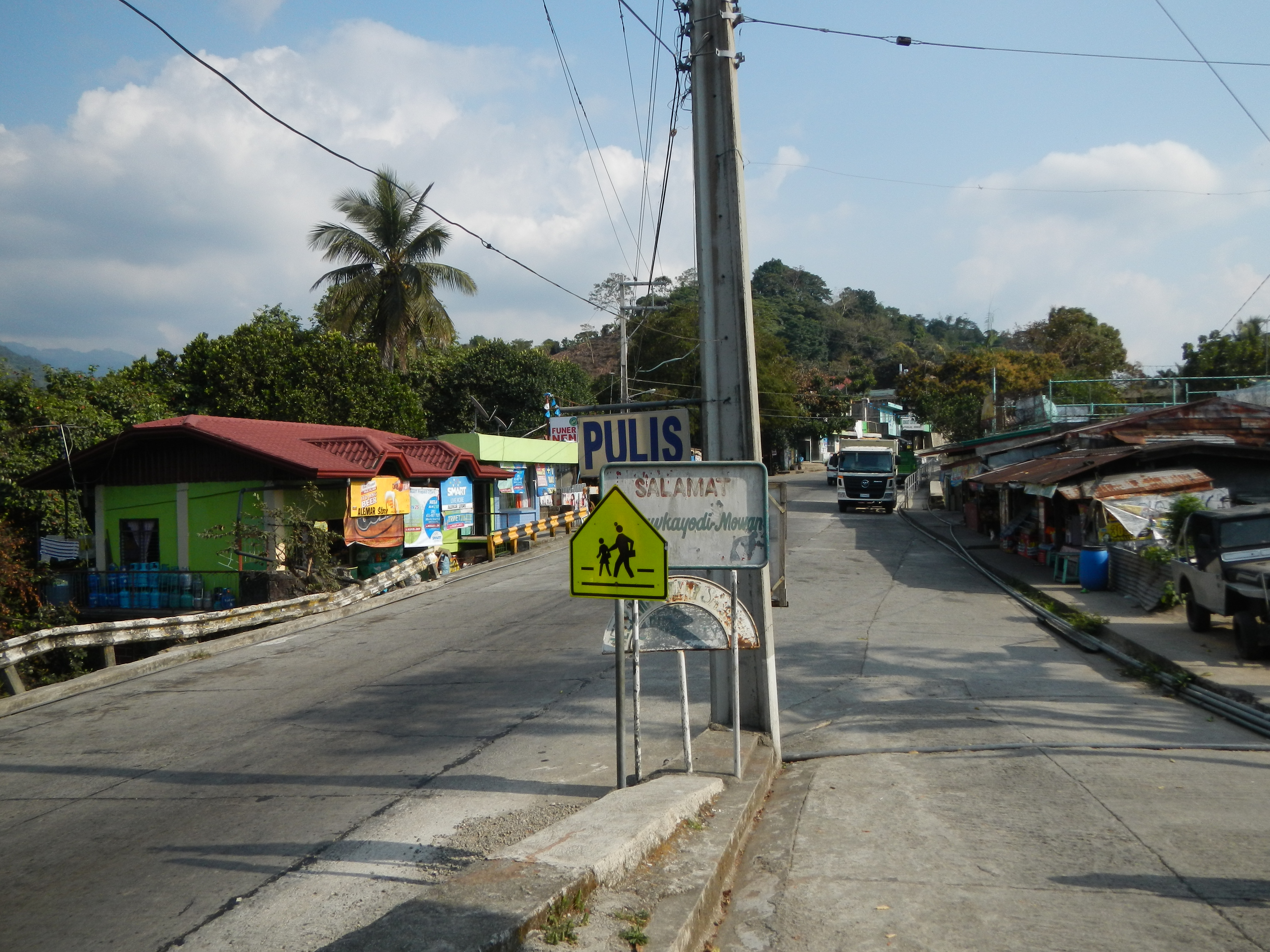
Downtown Sablan

Naguilian Road along Banangan

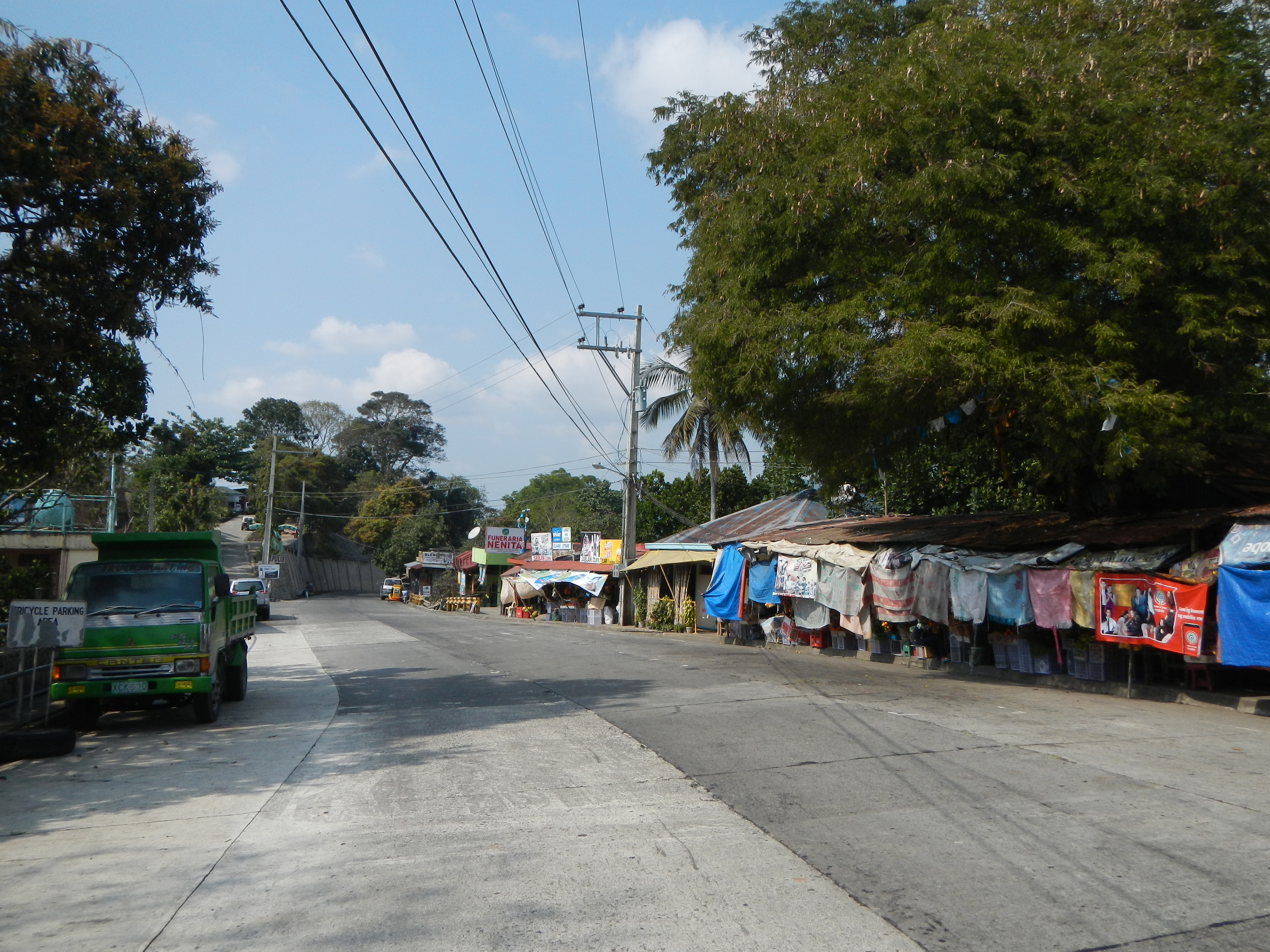
Fruit and souvenir stalls along Naguilian Road

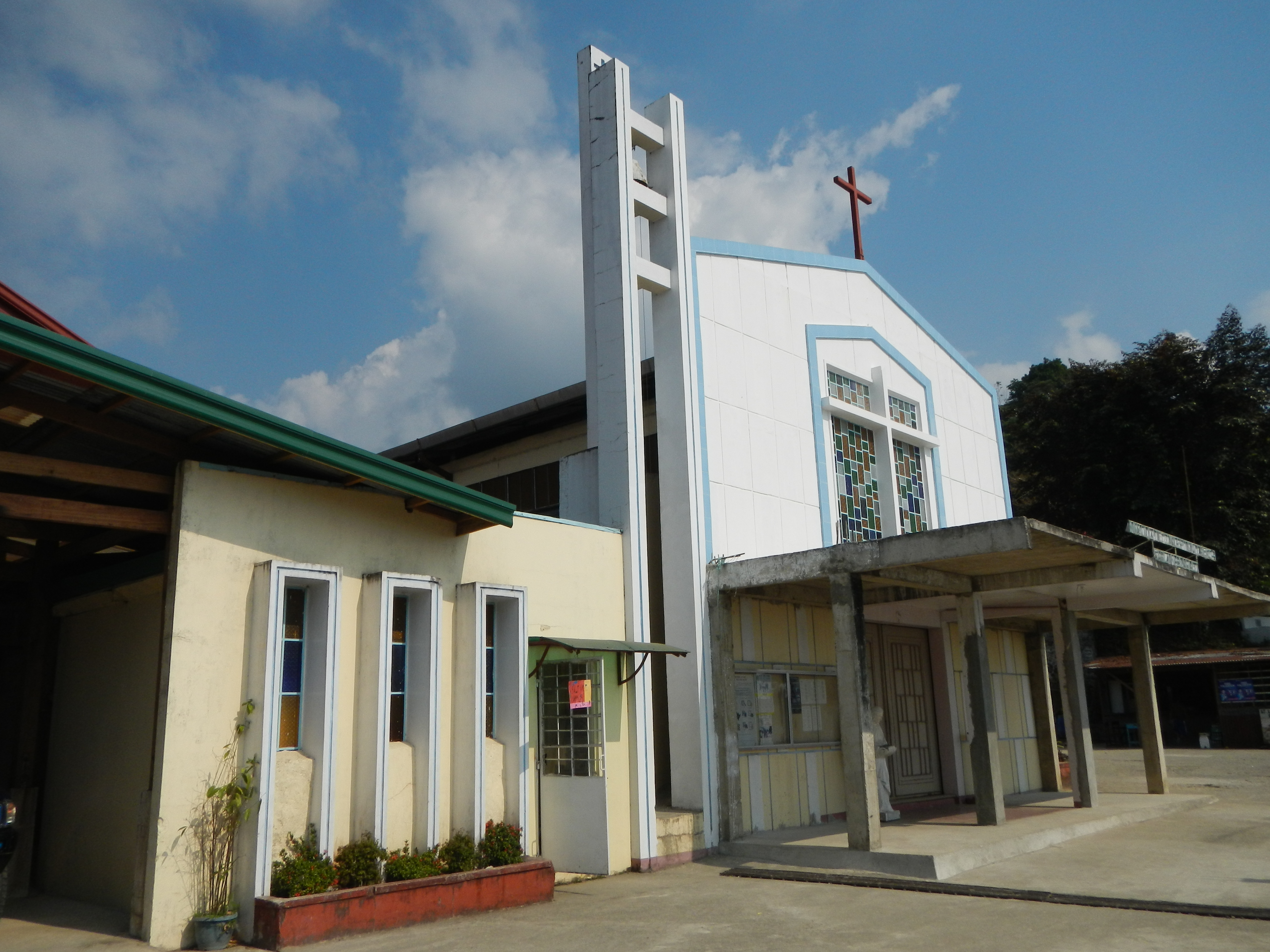
Immaculate Conception Parish Church
