= Tublay =

Municipality in Benguet, Philippines

- Municipality
- Municipality of Tublay
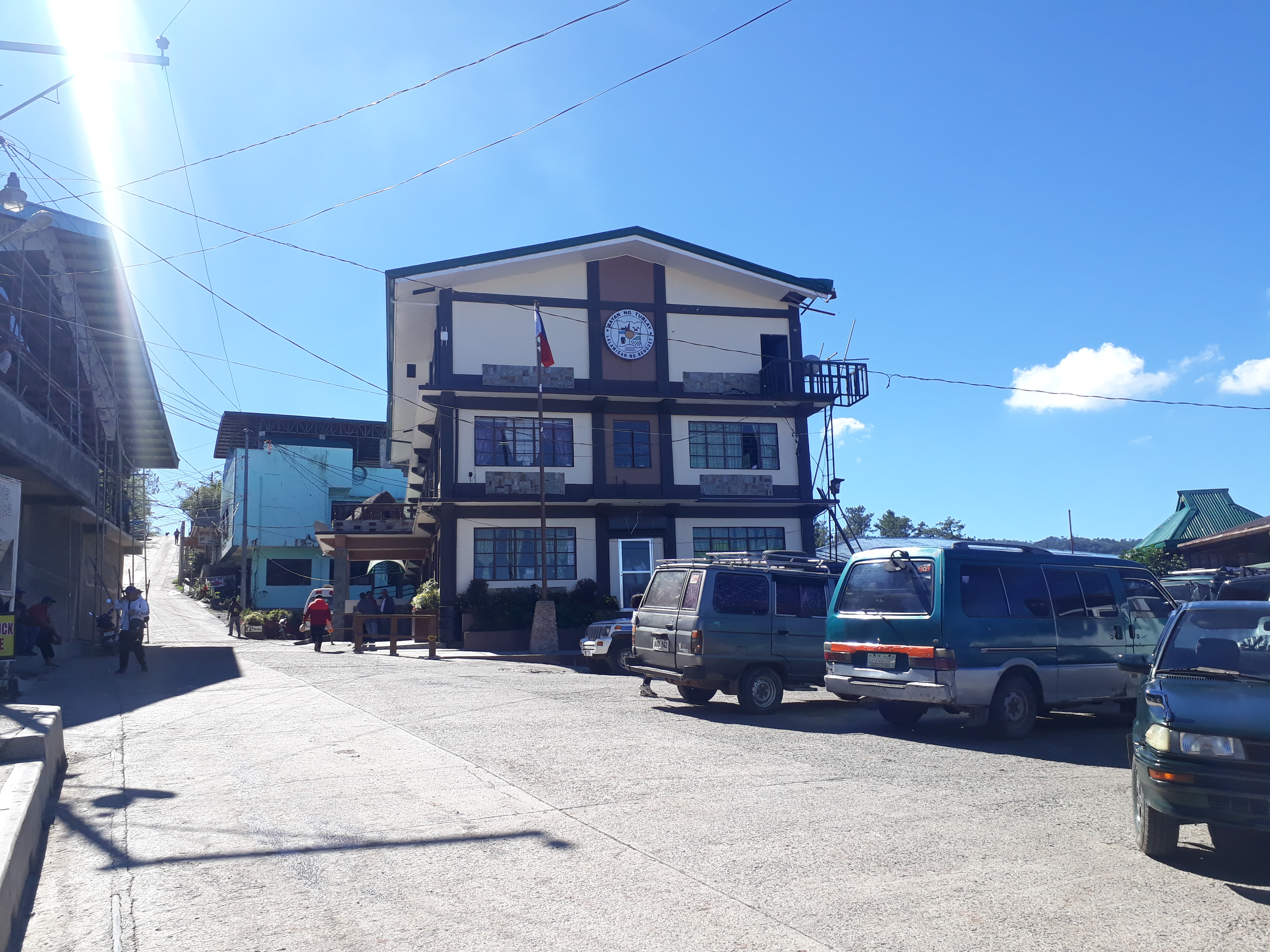
- Municipal hall

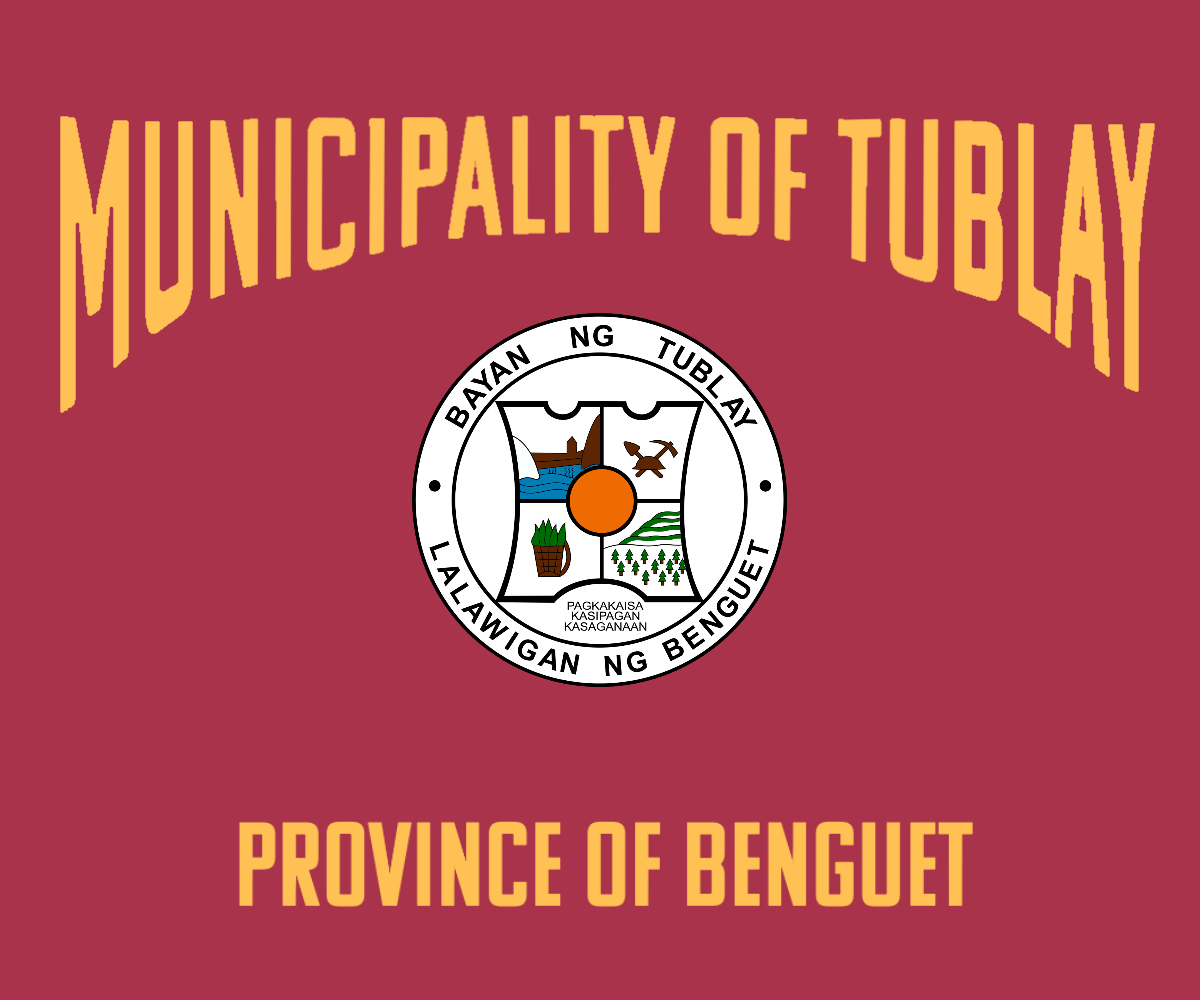
- Flag Seal

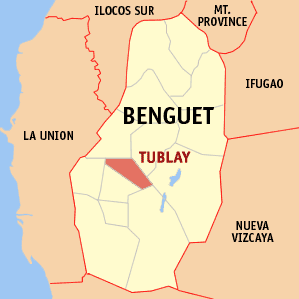
- Map of Benguet with Tublay highlighted
- Interactive map of Tublay
- Location within the Philippines
- Coordinates: 16°28′35″N 120°38′00″E
- Country: Philippines
- Region: Cordillera Administrative Region
- Province: Benguet
- District: Lone district
- Barangays: 8 (see Barangays)

Government
  - Type: Sangguniang Bayan
  - Mayor: Juan L. Esnara
  - Vice Mayor: Cruso M. Daguioa Jr.
  - Representative: Eric Go Yap
  - Municipal Council: Members: Marvin M. Mayos; Lailyn D. Polig; Daniel S. Kimpa-oy; Soriano M. Mendoza; Dinglee B. Berto; Nemescio A. Benito; Shane A. Awacan; Modesto P. Pangayan Jr.
  - Electorate: 12,284 voters (2025)

Area
  - Total: 102.55 km^{2} (39.59 sq mi)
- Elevation: 1,259 m (4,131 ft)
- Highest elevation: 1,817 m (5,961 ft)
- Lowest elevation: 671 m (2,201 ft)

Population (2024 census)
  - Total: 20,886
  - Density: 203.67/km^{2} (527.49/sq mi)
  - Households: 4,485

Economy
  - Income class: 4th municipal income class
  - Poverty incidence: 9.61% (2023)
  - Revenue: ₱ 130.3 million (2024)
  - Assets: ₱ 278.3 million (2024)
  - Expenditure: ₱ 116.3 million (2024)
  - Liabilities: ₱ 70.84 million (2024)

Service provider
  - Electricity: Benguet Electric Cooperative (BENECO)
- Time zone: UTC+8 (PST)
- ZIP code: 2615
- PSGC: 1401114000
- IDD : area code: +63 (0)74
- Native languages: Kankanaey; Ibaloi; Ilocano; Tagalog
- Website: tublay.gov.ph

Tublay, officially the Municipality of Tublay (Ilocano: Ili ti Tublay; Tagalog: Bayan ng Tublay), is a municipality in the province of Benguet, Philippines. According to the 2024 census, it has a population of 20,886 people.

== History ==
Tublay began as a township organized by the American government in November 1900. Magastino Laruan is appointed as the first town president (mayor) of Tublay. He is a part of the Cariño Family in Benguet.

== Geography ==
The Municipality of Tublay is at the central portion of Benguet. It is bounded by Kapangan on the north, Atok on the east, Itogon and Bokod on the southeast, La Trinidad on the west, and Sablan on the northwest.

According to the Philippine Statistics Authority, the municipality has a land area of 102.55 square kilometres (39.59 sq mi) constituting 3.70% of the 2,769.08-square-kilometre- (1,069.15 sq mi) total area of Benguet. The topography is generally mountainous with an elevation of 1,400 metres (4,600 ft) above sea level. It has two pronounced seasons - the dry and the wet seasons with a temperature coldest at 6.5 °C (43.7 °F) and warmest at 27.5 °C (81.5 °F). There are 2 seasons for Tublay, Benguet will be wet season from May to October and dry season from November to April.

Tublay is situated 6.72 kilometres (4.18 mi) from the provincial capital La Trinidad, and 259.66 kilometres (161.35 mi) from the country's capital city of Manila.

=== Barangays ===
Tublay is politically subdivided into 8 barangays. Each barangay consists of puroks and some have sitios.

Ambassador is the largest barangay in terms of land area (11.52 km^{2}), while Tuel is the smallest (4.79 km^{2}). These barangays are headed by elected officials: Barangay Captain, Barangay Council, whose members are called Barangay Councilors. All are elected every three years.

PSGC	Barangay	Population			±% p.a.	
		2024		2010		
141114001	Ambassador	27.0%	5,645	4,799	▴	1.12%
141114002	Ambongdolan	5.0%	1,054	980	▴	0.50%
141114003	Ba‑ayan	8.1%	1,684	1,736	▾	−0.21%
141114004	Basil	6.2%	1,302	1,198	▴	0.58%
141114005	Caponga	25.0%	5,220	1,937	▴	7.07%
141114006	Daclan	11.4%	2,385	4,049	▾	−3.58%
141114007	Tublay Central	4.0%	837	896	▾	−0.47%
141114008	Tuel	6.2%	1,302	960	▴	2.12%
	Total		20,886	19,429	▴	0.50%

=== Climate ===
Climate data for Tublay, Benguet
Month	Jan	Feb	Mar	Apr	May	Jun	Jul	Aug	Sep	Oct	Nov	Dec	Year
Mean daily maximum °C (°F)	24 (75)	25 (77)	26 (79)	27 (81)	26 (79)	28 (82)	24 (75)	24 (75)	24 (75)	25 (77)	25 (77)	25 (77)	25 (77)
Mean daily minimum °C (°F)	15 (59)	16 (61)	17 (63)	19 (66)	19 (66)	20 (68)	19 (66)	19 (66)	19 (66)	18 (64)	17 (63)	15 (59)	18 (64)
Average precipitation mm (inches)	42 (1.7)	48 (1.9)	74 (2.9)	110 (4.3)	269 (10.6)	275 (10.8)	362 (14.3)	325 (12.8)	330 (13.0)	306 (12.0)	126 (5.0)	61 (2.4)	2,328 (91.7)
Average rainy days	11.2	12.0	17.1	21.2	27.1	26.8	28.1	27.0	26.0	24.5	17.7	12.4	251.1
Source: Meteoblue

== Demographics ==
Population census of Tublay
Year	Pop.	±% p.a.
1903	11	—
1918	2,310	+42.83%
1939	4,265	+2.96%
1948	5,068	+1.94%
1960	5,843	+1.19%
1970	7,413	+2.41%
1975	8,610	+3.05%
1980	9,686	+2.38%
1990	11,479	+1.71%
1995	13,263	+2.74%
2000	13,672	+0.65%
2007	15,096	+1.38%
2010	16,555	+3.41%
2015	17,892	+1.49%
2020	19,429	+1.75%
2024	20,886	+1.75%
Source: Philippine Statistics Authority

In the 2024 census, Tublay had a population of 20,886 people. The population density was 200 inhabitants per square kilometre (520/sq mi).

== Economy ==
Poverty incidence of Tublay (%)

Source: Philippine Statistics Authority

Farming is the main source of economy in Tublay. Tublay produces vegetables, coffee, cacao, ginger, and fruits like strawberries and lemons. Tublay gears itself as one of the tourism destinations in Benguet. Tublay's proximity to the Halsema Highway helps farmers transport goods in towns such as La Trinidad and Baguio city.

== Government ==
=== Local government ===
Tublay, belonging to the lone congressional district of the province of Benguet, is governed by a mayor designated as its local chief executive and by a municipal council as its legislative body in accordance with the Local Government Code. The mayor, vice mayor, and the councilors are elected directly by the people through an election which is being held every three years.

=== Elected officials ===
Members of the Municipal Council (2025-2028)
Position	Name
Congressman	Eric G. Yap
Mayor	Juan L. Esnara
Vice-Mayor	Cruso M. Daguioa Jr.
Councilors	Marvin M. Mayos
Councilors	Lailyn D. Polig
Councilors	Daniel S. Kimpa-oy
Councilors	Soriano M. Mendoza
Councilors	Dinglee B. Berto
Councilors	Nemescio A. Benito
Councilors	Shane A. Awacan
Councilors	Modesto P. Pangayan Jr.

== Education ==
The Tublay Schools District Office governs all educational institutions within the municipality. It oversees the management and operations of all private and public, from primary to secondary schools.

=== Public schools ===
As of 2014, Tublay has 19 public elementary schools and 2 public secondary schools.

Elementary (2013-2014)
School	Barangay
Albis Elementary School	Daclan
Ambongdolan Elementary School	Ambongdolan
Ba-ayan Elementary School	Ba-ayan
Ba-ayan Elementary School - Annex	Ba-ayan
Balangabang Elementary School	Tuel
Basil Elementary School	Basil
Ciriaco Magno Elementary School	Daclan
Dackias Elementary School	Tuel
Dorencio Elementary School	Ambassador
Langbis Primary School	Ambongdolan
Luisa Becka Elementary School	Ambassador
Mamuyod Elementary School	Ambassador
Moran Elementary School	Tuel
Palew Elementary School	Caponga
Pangablan Primary School	Basil
Paoad Elementary School	Caponga
Pontino Elementary School	Ambassador
Santo Niño Elementary School	Ambassador
Tublay Central School	Tublay Central

Secondary (2013-2014)
School	Barangay
Tublay School of Home Industries	Caponga
Tublay School of Home Industries - Central Extension	Tublay Central
