= San Jose School of La Trinidad =

Roman Catholic school in Benguet, Philippines

San Jose School of La Trinidad Inc.

Location
- Poblacion, La Trinidad, Benguet; Philippines
- Coordinates: 16°27′39″N 120°35′11″E

Information
- Former name: San Jose High School
- Type: Private, Catholic school
- Religious affiliation: Roman Catholic
- Established: 3 August 1964

San Jose School of La Trinidad Inc. (formerly known as San Jose High School) is a private Catholic school located in the municipality of La Trinidad, Benguet, Philippines.

== History ==
In 1960, Rev. Fr. John Wageners, C.I.C.M., was appointed the parish priest of La Trinidad Mission. At that time, there was no Catholic school yet in the parish, so he decided to put one up. He contacted Brother Peter Verhaegh, C.I.C.M., who created plans. Construction got underway on March 21, 1964. The eastern wing was completed in four months, and the school was formally opened with 101 students on August 3, 1964, while construction was still underway. The first second-year students were all transferees, mostly from private schools in Baguio. When the school building was finally finished, it had 14 classrooms, a library, a laboratory, offices, a gymnasium, a stage, social halls, vocational rooms, and some storerooms. The first group of 41 students graduated in 1967.

The number of students tripled over the next ten years. Because of restrictions on further expansion because of the size of the property, some offices were converted into classrooms. During the 1988–1989 school year, the student population had reached over a thousand. Rev. Fr. Brigido Galasgas, then the school director, converted the social halls and vocational rooms into classrooms to accommodate the 20 section students. There was still a need for more classrooms and offices, so Fr. Galasgas put up another building on the only available space—behind the Father's Rectory. During the Silver Jubilee year (1989–1990), 1,037 students were enrolled at San Jose High School. San Jose Preparatory School also opened that year.

On July 16, 1990, an earthquake damaged the main school building beyond repair. The building had to be demolished. Temporary classrooms were constructed on the playground and in the open gymnasium to hold regular classes. Construction of the new school building started in 1991 and was completed in 1994.

Recently, the school administration changed its original name of San Jose High School to "San Jose School of La Trinidad Inc." wherein it was divided into two departments; San Jose School of La Trinidad Inc. High School and Elementary Departments.

The School celebrated its Golden Jubilee Celebration on August 4, 2014, together with its current Administration.

== Academic standards ==
The school follows the curriculum prescribed and approved by the Department of Education of the Philippines. The academic year contains a minimum of 200 school days, distributed over a minimum of 42 school weeks. This is based on the school calendar prescribed or approved by the Department of Education.

== Affiliations ==
- CEAP (Catholic Educational Association of the Philippines)
- Roman Catholic Diocese of Baguio
