= Philippine Nazarene College =

Christian college in Benguet, Philippines

- Former names: Nazarene Bible College; Luzon Nazarene Bible College (1952-1969)
- Type: Private
- Location: La Trinidad, Benguet, Philippines; 16°26′39″N 120°34′50″E
- Website: philnazcollege.edu.ph/pncwp/
- Location in Luzon Location in the Philippines

Philippine Nazarene College (PNC), formerly known as Luzon Nazarene Bible College (LNBC), is an undergraduate-level institution located at La Trinidad, Benguet in the Philippines. Operating as Nazarene Bible College from 1952 to 1969, PNC is a theological college in the Wesleyan theological tradition and affiliated with the Church of the Nazarene through its Division of World Mission.

On November 7, 2019, Rev. Allan A. Prado was elected as 12th President after serving as the Officer-in-charge for the past three years.
