= La Trinidad Strawberry Farm =

Farm and tourist site in Benguet, Philippines

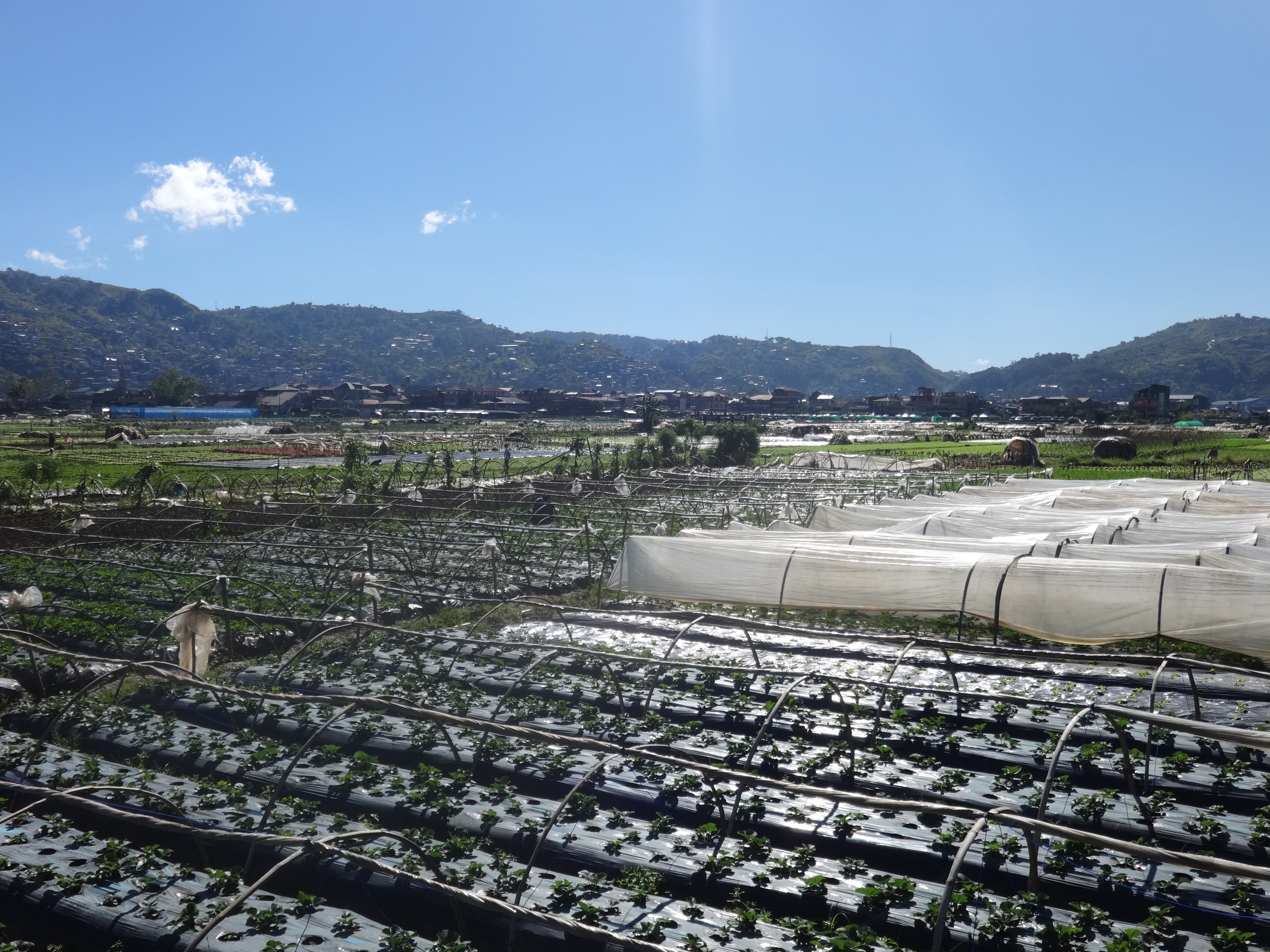
- The strawberry fields in 2018
- Town/City: La Trinidad
- Province: Benguet
- Country: Philippines
- Coordinates: 16°27′07.4″N 120°34′56.2″E
- Owner: Benguet State University
- Area: 79.49 hectares (196.4 acres)
- Produces: Strawberries
- Status: Open to the public

The La Trinidad Strawberry Farm is a farm in the town of La Trinidad, Benguet, Philippines primarily used for the cultivation of strawberries. The farm is also open to tourism.

== Background ==
The strawberry farm is located in Barangay Betag of La Trinidad, Benguet and is owned and maintained by the Benguet State University (BSU). The BSU leases at least 500 to 1,000 square meters (5,400 to 10,800 sq ft) lots of the 79.49 hectares (196.4 acres) farm to local farmers for strawberry cultivation.

Strawberries are an important part of La Trinidad's economy with the Strawberry Festival held in the town every March.

== Production ==
The average annual harvest of the farm as of 2018 is 1,775 metric tons (1,747 long tons; 1,957 short tons) harvested by 660 farmers.

== Tourism ==
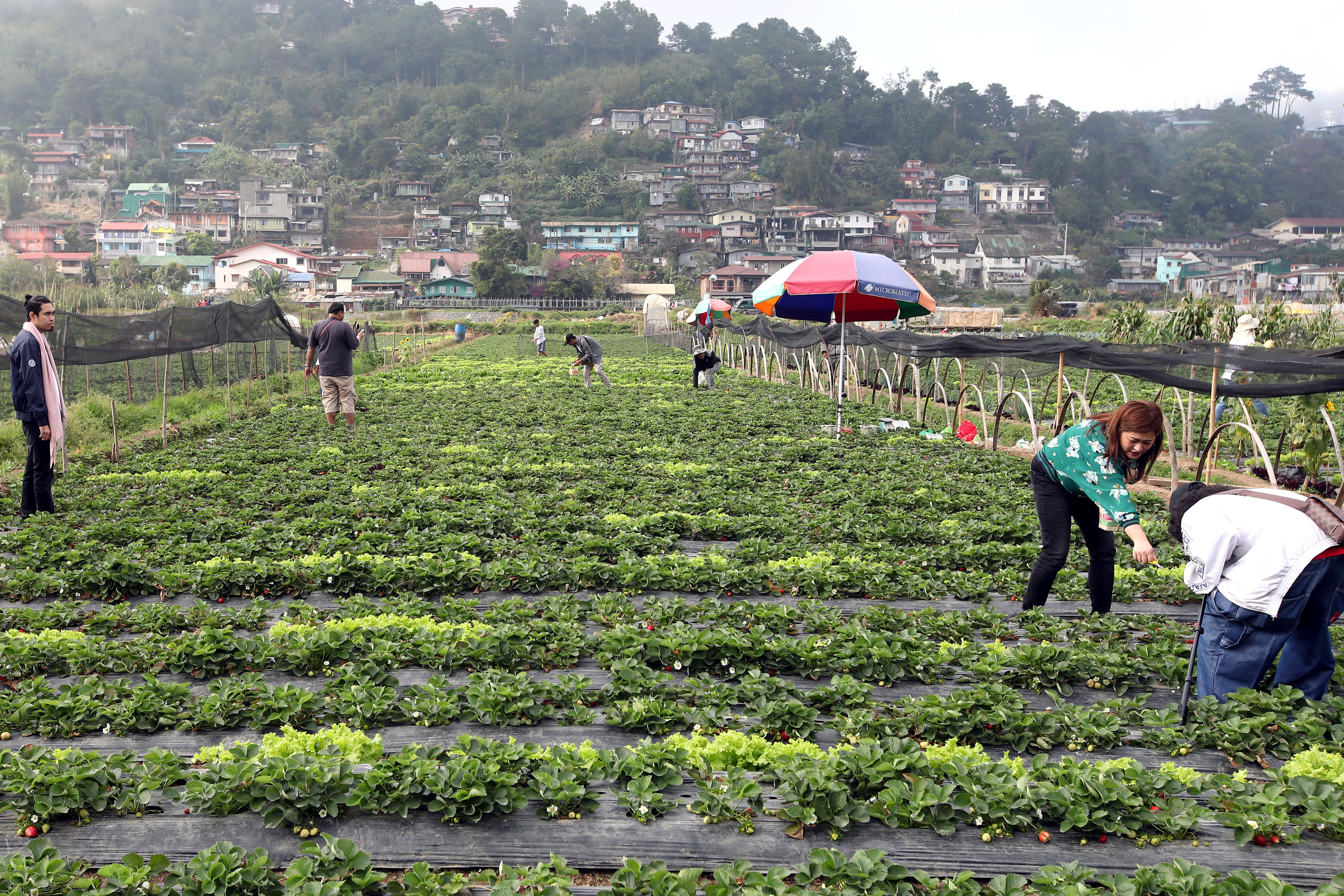
Tourist harvesting strawberries in 2018

The La Trinidad Strawberry Farm is a destination for tourist visiting the town of La Trinidad. According to the Benguet Tourism Office, the strawberry farm is the most visited tourist destination in the province with 538,346 tourist arrivals for the first quarter of 2017.

It is sometimes mistaken to be situated in neighboring Baguio with local vendors selling souvenir and products bearing the name "Baguio" within the vicinity of the farm. This led the municipal government of La Trinidad to come up with a Tourism Code in 2018 encouraging the explicit promotion of the "La Trinidad" name.
