= Benguet State University =

Public university in Benguet, Philippines

- Pamantasang Pampamahalaan ng Benguet (Filipino)
- Former names: List: La Trinidad Farm School (1916–1920); Trinidad Agricultural School (1920–1946); La Trinidad Agricultural High School; La Trinidad National Agricultural School; Mountain National Agricultural School; Mountain National College; Mountain Agricultural College; Mountain State Agricultural College (1969-1986)
- Motto: Bringing Service with Utmost Quality and Dedication
- Type: Public state university Co-educational Non-profit Research higher education institution
- Established: 1916
- Academic affiliations: AACCUP
- President: Kenneth Alip Laruan
- Vice-president: List: Kenneth Laruan (VP for Academics); Roscinto Ian Lumbres (VP for Research & Extension); Silvestre Aben (VP for Business Affairs); John James Malamug; (VP for Administration & Finance)
- Students: 10,000++ (elementary, secondary and tertiary)
- Location: La Trinidad, Benguet, Philippines; 16°27′07″N 120°35′27″E
- Campus: Main campus (La Trinidad); Satellite campuses (Buguias and Bokod)
- Colors: and Green and yellow
- Sporting affiliations: BBEAL
- Mascot: Wildcats
- Website: www.bsu.edu.ph

- Location in Luzon Location in the Philippines

Benguet State University (BSU) is a state university in the province of Benguet, Philippines. Its main campus is in La Trinidad.

== History ==
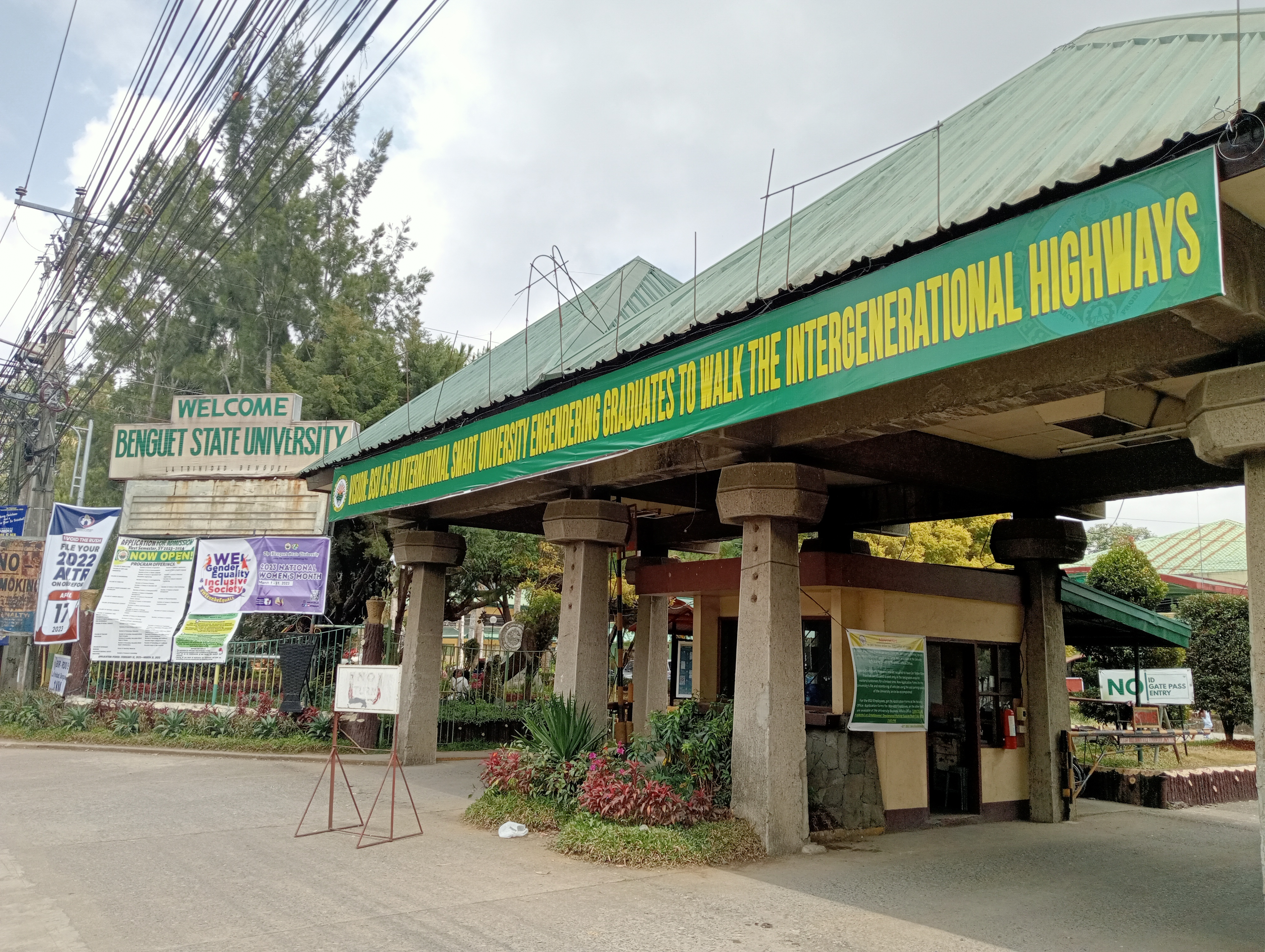
Main gate of Benguet State University in 2023

BSU started as the La Trinidad Farm School, an experimental agricultural site, on pasture land donated by La Trinidad mayor Clemente Laoyan I. The school was later elevated to the Trinidad Agricultural School (TAS) in 1920. The school reopened after World War II and became the La Trinidad Agricultural High School. Four months later, it was nationalized and renamed as the Mountain National Agricultural School (MNAS). It was soon converted into the Mountain National College (MNAC), Mountain Agricultural College (MAC), and Mountain State Agricultural College (MSAC) in 1969 through Republic Act 5923.

On January 12, 1986, the school was converted into a chartered state university by virtue of Presidential Decree 2010.

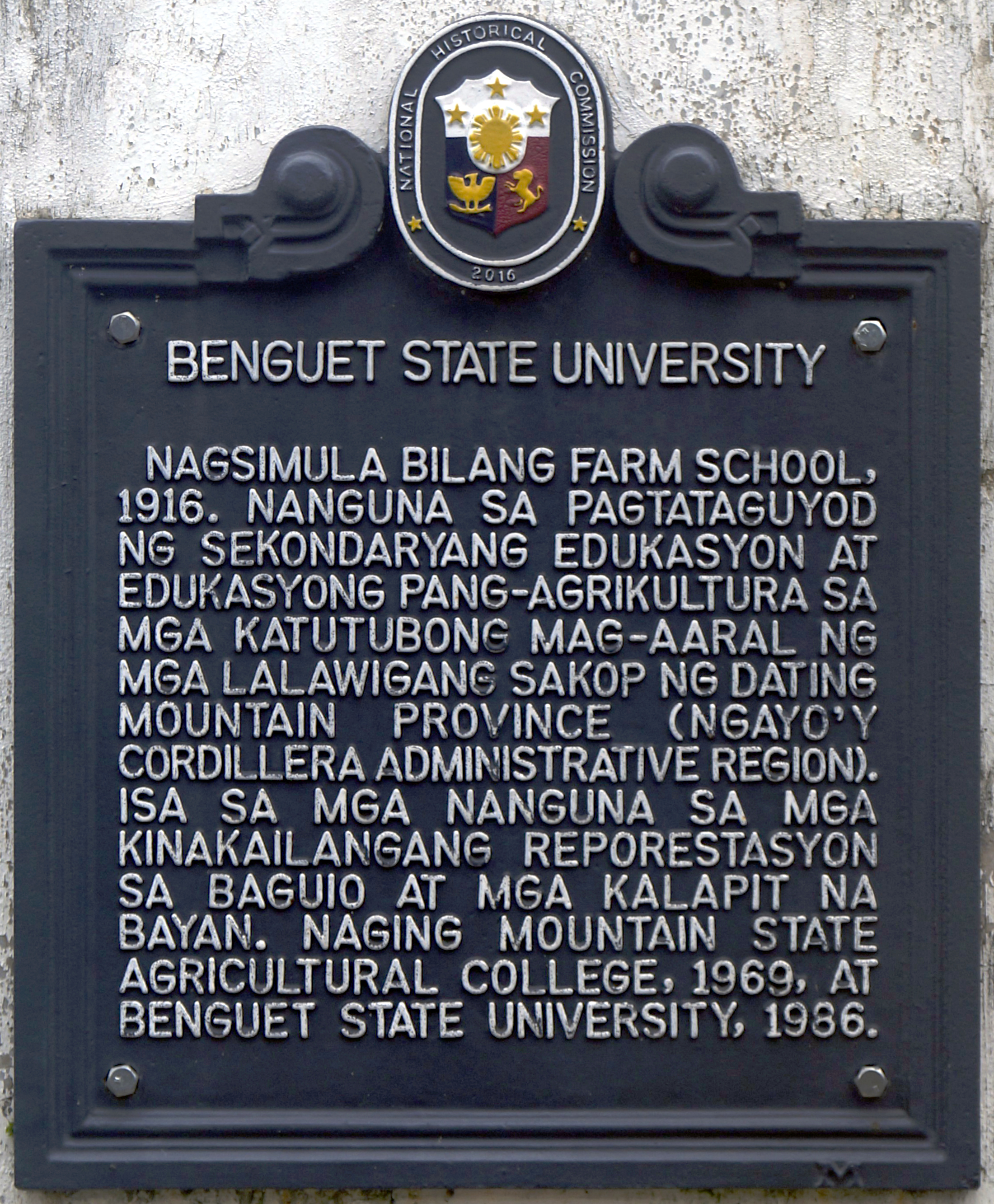
National historical marker unveiled in 2016

As of May 2018, Benguet State University is recognized by the Commission on Higher Education (CHED) as a Center of Excellence (COE) for Teacher education, and Center of Development (COD) for both Agriculture education, and Nutrition and Dietetics.

In 2024, BSU created 100 hectares of bamboo forest with the Tuba propagules plantation for its revived the PHP5 million DOST "bamboo forest area project" of bamboo textile, engineered bamboo production (“bayog” & “giant” bamboo) and reforestation at Benguet Corporation and BSU Mankayan.

== Academics ==
BSU has two satellite campuses, 15 colleges and a graduate school. It also runs an open university. These units offer graduate and undergraduate degree programs in agriculture, forestry, teacher's education, nursing, physical sciences and the arts. Some units offer non-degree programs and short courses.

=== Colleges and Institutions ===
College of Agriculture

- Bachelor of Science in Agribusiness
- Bachelor of Science in Agriculture
- Master of Science in Agribusiness Management
- Master of Science in Soil Science
- Master of Science in Agricultural Economics
- Master of Science in Agronomy
- Master of Science in Animal Science
- Master of Science in Entomology
- Master of Science in Horticulture
- Master of Science in Plant Pathology
- Master of Science in Rural Development
- Doctor of Philosophy in Agronomy
- Doctor of Philosophy in Horticulture
- Doctor of Philosophy in Rural Development

College of Arts and Humanities

- Bachelor of Arts in Communication
- Bachelor of Arts in English Language
- Bachelor of Arts in Filipino Language
- Master of Arts in English as a Second Language
- Master of Arts in Filipino
- Doctor of Philosophy in Language

College of Criminal Justice Education

- Bachelor of Science in Criminology

College of Engineering

- Bachelor of Science in Agricultural & Biosystems Engineering
- Bachelor of Science in Civil Engineering
- Bachelor of Science in Electrical Engineering
- Bachelor of Science in Industrial Engineering

College of Forestry

- Bachelor of Science in Forestry
- Master of Science in Forestry

College of Home Economics and Technology

- Bachelor of Science in Entrepreneurship
- Bachelor of Science in Food Technology
- Bachelor of Science in Hotel Management
- Bachelor of Science in Nutrition and Dietetics
- Bachelor of Science in Tourism Management
- Master of Arts in Home Economics
- Master of Arts in Technical and Vocational Studies

College of Human Kinetics

- Bachelor of Physical Education
- Bachelor of Science in Exercise and Sports Science
- Master of Science in Physical Education
- Diploma in Physical Education

College of Information Sciences

- Bachelor in Library and Information Services
- Bachelor of Science in Development Communication
- Bachelor of Science in Information Technology
- Master in Library and Information Science

College of Medicine (SOON TO OPEN)

College of Natural Sciences

- Bachelor of Science in Biology
- Bachelor of Science in Chemistry
- Bachelor of Science in Environmental Science
- Master of Science in Biology
- Master of Science in Chemistry
- Master of Science in Environmental Science
- Doctor of Philosophy in Science Education

College of Numeracy and Applied Science

- Bachelor of Science in Mathematics
- Bachelor of Science in Statistics
- Master of Arts in Applied Statistics
- Master of Science in General Science
- Master of Arts in Mathematics
- Master of Arts in Physics

College of Nursing

- Bachelor of Science in Nursing

College of Public Administration and Governance

- Bachelor of Public Administration
- Master in Public Administration

College of Social Sciences

- Bachelor of Arts in History
- Bachelor of Science in Psychology
- Master of Arts in Social Studies

College of Teacher Education

- Bachelor of Early Childhood Education
- Bachelor of Elementary Education
- Bachelor of Secondary Education
- Bachelor of Technology and Livelihood Education
- Master of Arts in Education major in Early Childhood Education
- Master of Arts in Educational Administration and Supervision
- Master of Arts in Elementary Education Master of Arts in Guidance
- Doctor of Philosophy in Education major in Education Management

College of Veterinary Medicine

- Doctor of Veterinary Medicine

Open University Masteral Degree Programs (Open University)

- Master in Human Resource Management
- Master in Community Development
- Master in Development Communication
- Master in Urban Management
- Master in Non-Formal Education
- Master in Community Health Development
- Master in Cooperative Management

POST-BACCALAUREATE

- Diploma in Training Management
- Diploma in Community Health Development
- Certificate in Organic Agriculture

=== Campuses ===
- La Trinidad, Benguet (Main Campus)
- Buguias, Benguet (Satellite Campus)
- Bokod, Benguet (Satellite Campus)
- Kapangan, Benguet (Satellite Campus)

=== Elementary and secondary schools ===
Besides having college campuses, the school had also elementary and secondary campuses called Elementary Laboratory School (ELS) and the secondary as the Secondary Laboratory School (SLS). The ELS campus is located at Km. 5, La Trinidad while the SLS campus is in the Outpost, La Trinidad.

== Gallery ==
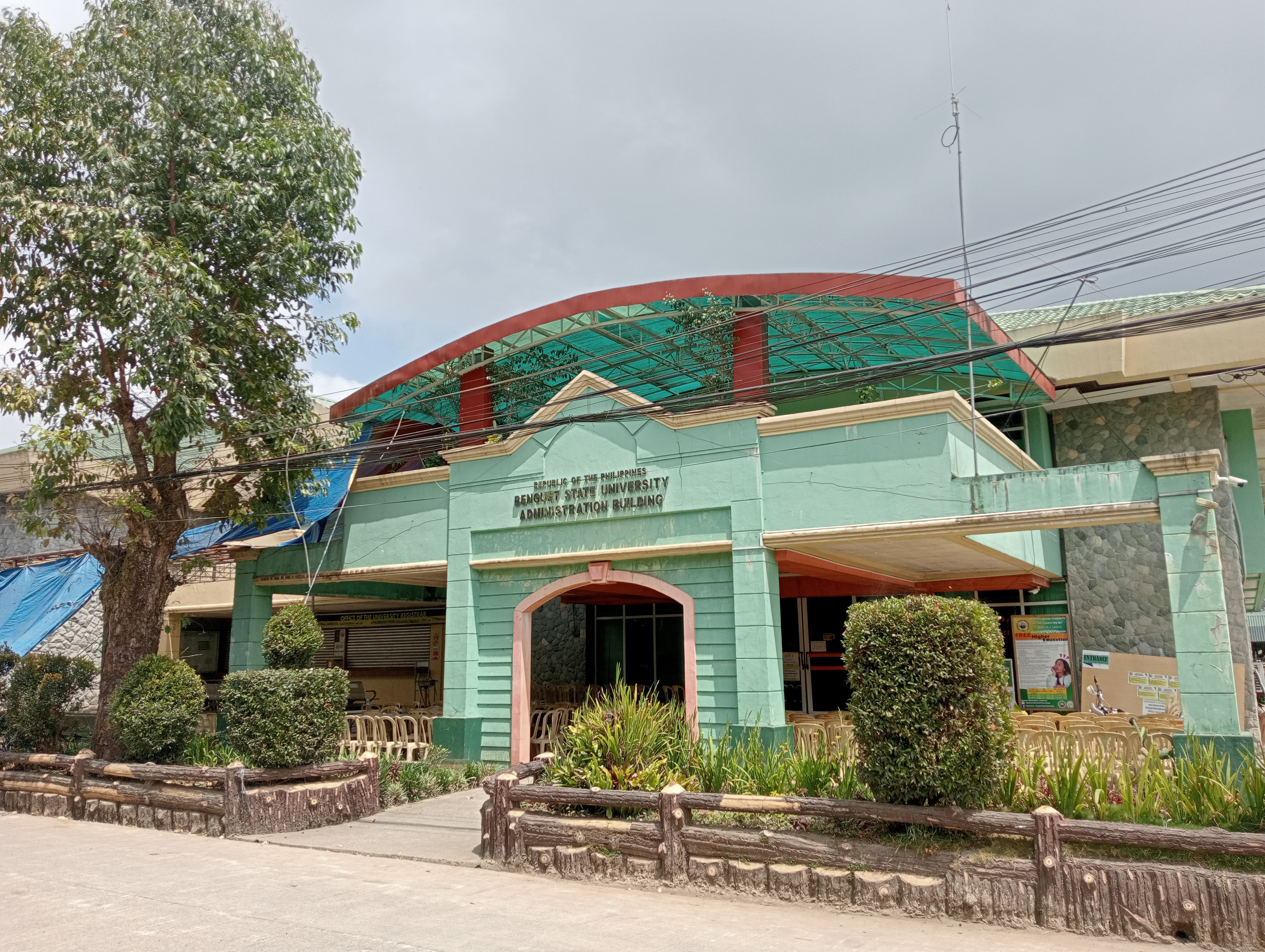
Administration Building

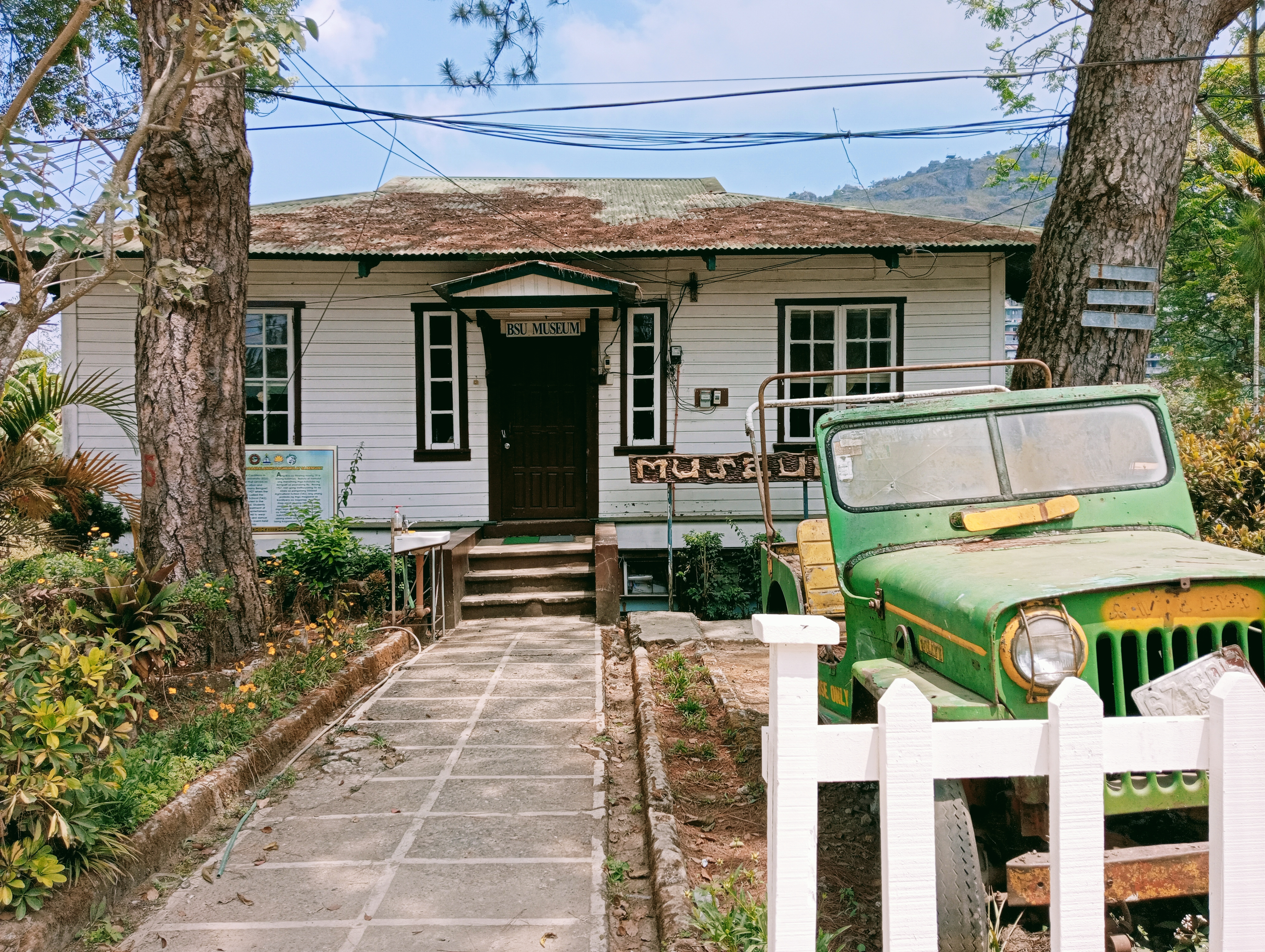
University Museum

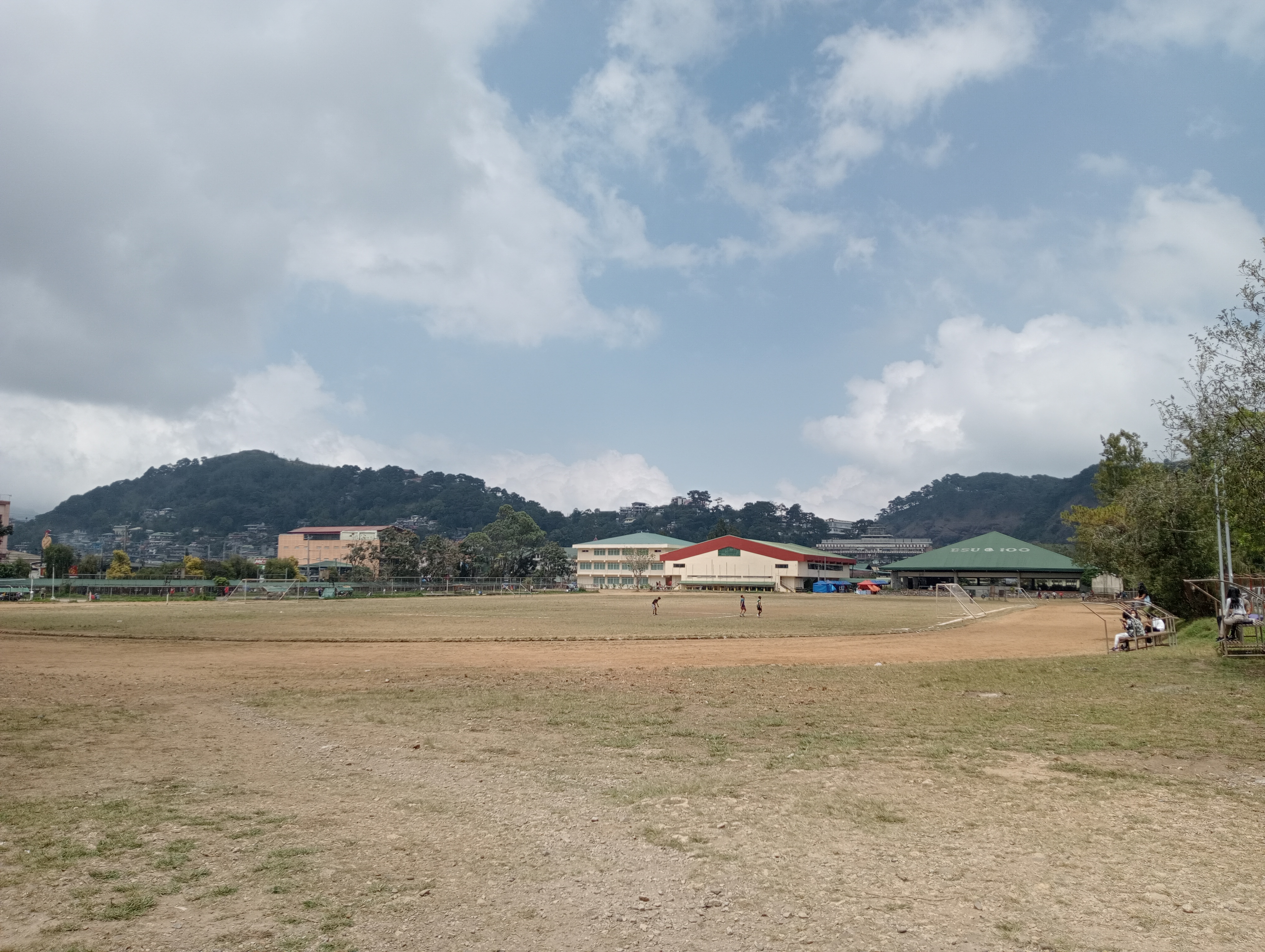
Open field

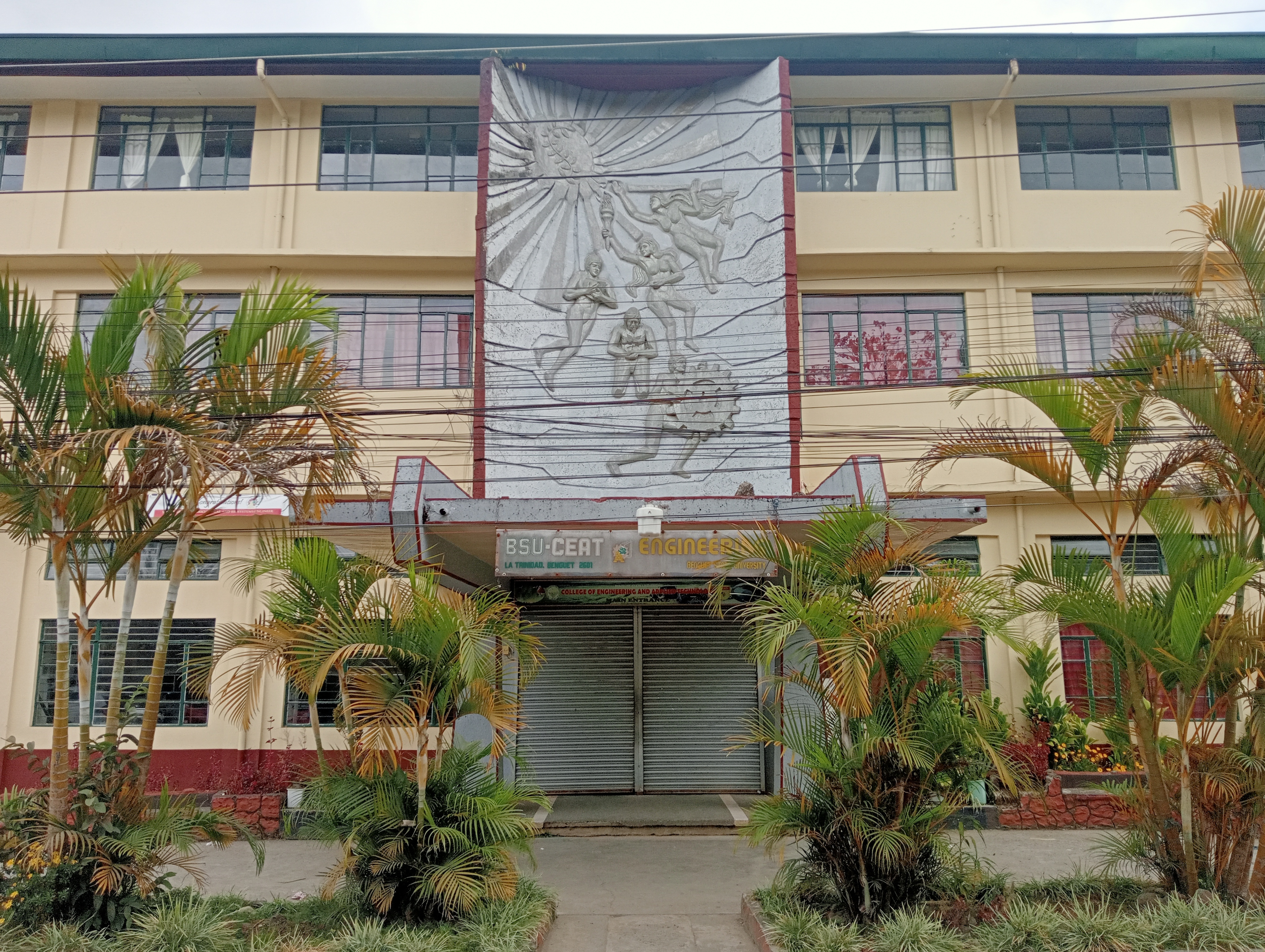
CEAT Building

== See also ==
- La Trinidad Strawberry Farm
