= Colors of StoBoSa =

Public artwork in Benguet, Philippines

- StoBoSa Hillside Homes Artwork
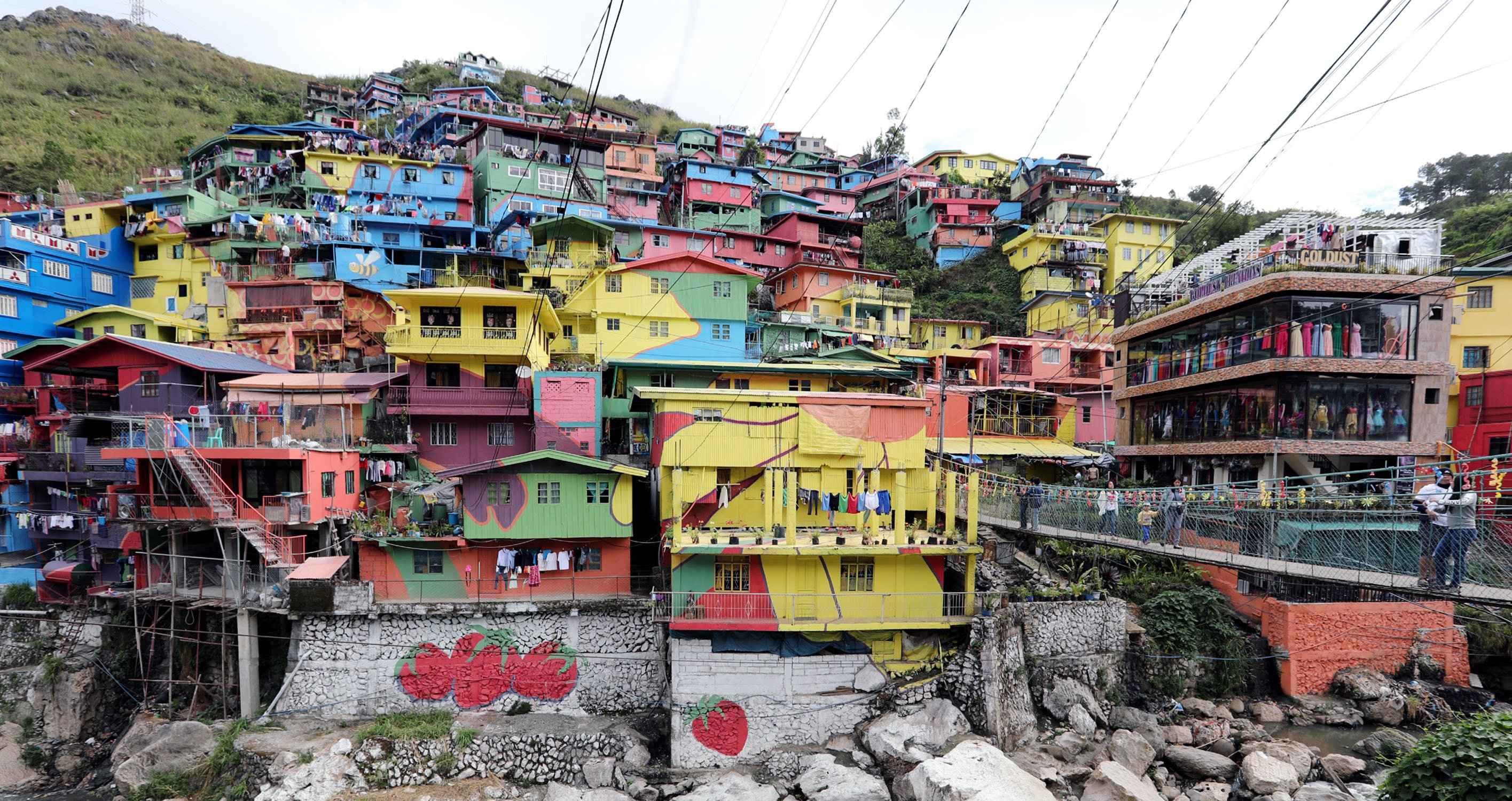
- The artwork in 2017.

- Location in Luzon Location in the Philippines
- Artist: Concept; Tam-awan Artist Village; Paintwork; 520 volunteers
- Year: 2016
- Medium: Paint
- Subject: Sunflowers and rainbows
- Dimensions: More than 18,000 m^{2} (190,000 sq ft) (~150-200 houses)
- Designation: Officially designated as a tourist attraction by the La Trinidad municipal government.
- Location: La Trinidad, Benguet, Philippines; 16°26′03.8″N 120°35′51.2″E

The Colors of StoBoSa, officially designated as the StoBoSa Hillside Homes Artwork, is a community artwork designed by the Tam-awan Village group, and is a locally recognized tourist attraction in the town of La Trinidad, Benguet. The paintwork of multiple houses composes the single artwork.

== Name and location ==
The artwork is known as the StoBoSa Hillside Homes Artwork, which is also the official designation for the artwork by the municipal government, and is also called simply as the Colors of StoBoSa. "Stobosa" is a portmanteau of the names of the sitios the artwork is situated namely Stonehill, Botiwtiw, and Sadjap. The three localities are all within Barangay Balili.

== Background ==
The artwork was commissioned as part of the Rev-Bloom Urban Redevelopment Tourism Campaign a project conceptualized by the Department of Tourism-Cordillera Administrative Region (DOT-CAR) under Regional Director Venus Tan and the La Trinidad local government under Edna Tabana.

=== Conceptualization ===
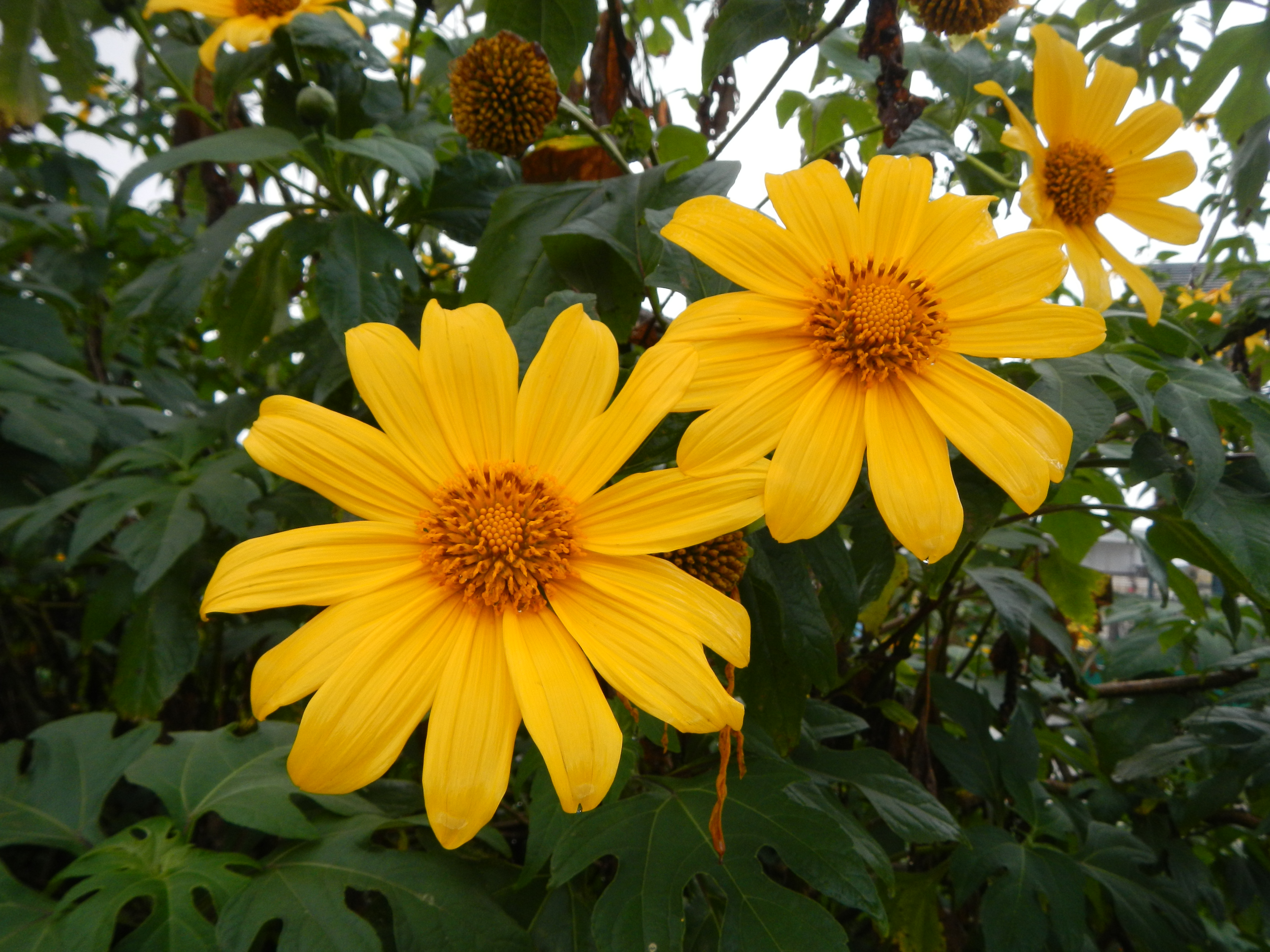
Sunflowers are a primary motif for Colors of StoBoSa.

The design of the artwork was conceptualized by Tam-awan Artist Village group by the Chanum Foundation led by solar artist Jordan Mang-osan along with Niño Jose B. Seriosa as the Graphic Artist, Ged Alangui, Clinton Aniversario, and Jenny Lorenzo. Gloria Agasen was the project coordinator.

Based on favela paintings of Brazil, the making of the Colors of Stobosa involved the painting of around 150-200 houses or an area of 18,000 square meters (190,000 sq ft). It is a combination of four designs made by the Tam-Awan Village artists. The designs, perceived as easy to make and aesthetically pleasing, were selected from a multitude of designs. The sunflower was chosen as a main motif of the artwork since the area used to be a full of the flowering plant. Rainbows also form part of the design.

=== Paintwork ===
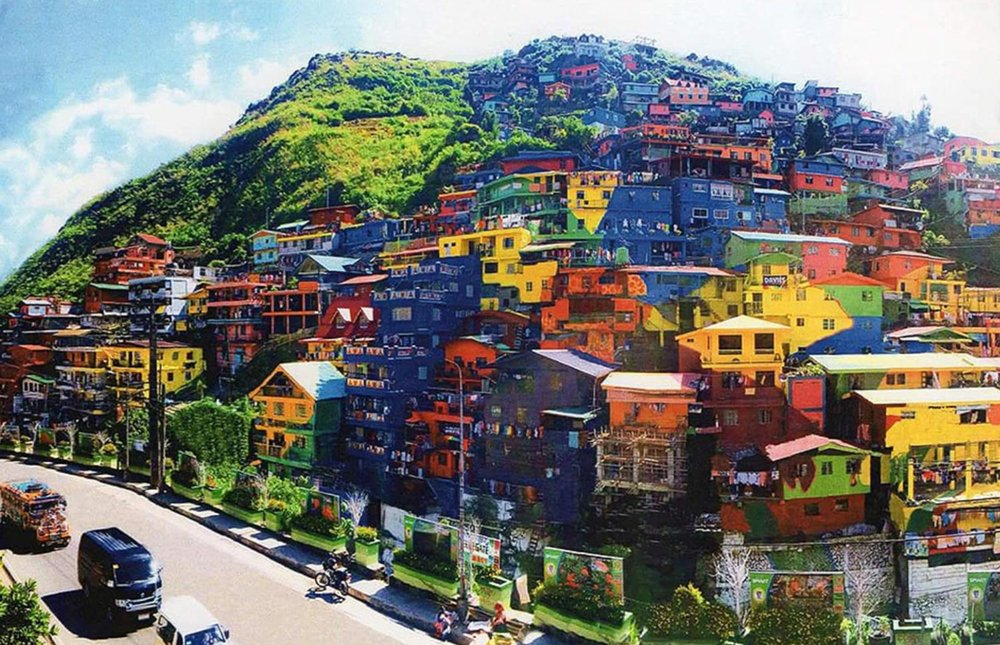
Colors of Stobosa in 2016.

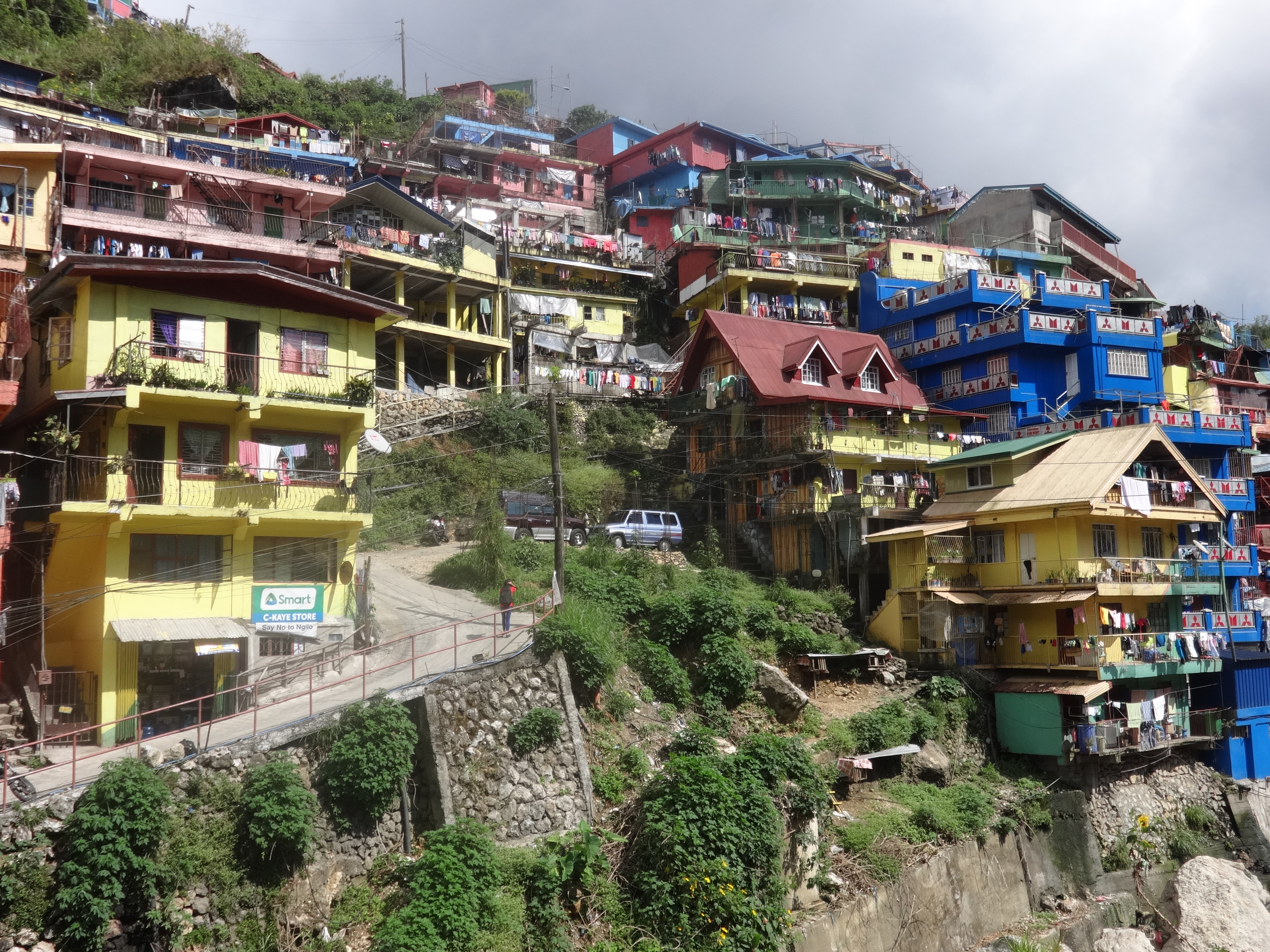
Colors of Stobosa in 2018.

Painting of the artwork began in February 2016 and was inaugurated on June 23, 2016 though it was only projected to be completed by August 2016. At the time of its unveiling the artwork was already 80 percent complete.

520 people, being residents of the three sitios as well as volunteers, painted the houses. They underwent training which started in January 2016. The outlines were applied after the color within them were painted. The 2,800 gallons of paint costing ₱2 million used were provided by local paint firm, Davies Paints, while other painting materials were provided by the local government.

The painting has a projected life expectancy of five years and a retouching of the work is planned in mid-2018.

== Recognition ==
The artwork is officially recognized as a tourist attraction of La Trinidad, Benguet by the municipal government. The recognition was given to the artwork through Sangguiniang Bayan (transl. Municipal Council) Resolution No. 130 which was adopted on July 12, 2016. The resolution was sponsored by councilors Roderick Awingan, Estrella Adeban, and Henry Kipas.

== Similar projects ==
The Department of Tourism plans a similar project in the neighboring city of Baguio. The endeavour is called Project Puraw which involves the painting of houses in Quirino Hill.
