= San Jose the Husband of Mary Parish Church (La Trinidad) =

Roman Catholic church in Benguet, Philippines

San Jose Parish Church
- San Jose the Husband of Mary Parish Church
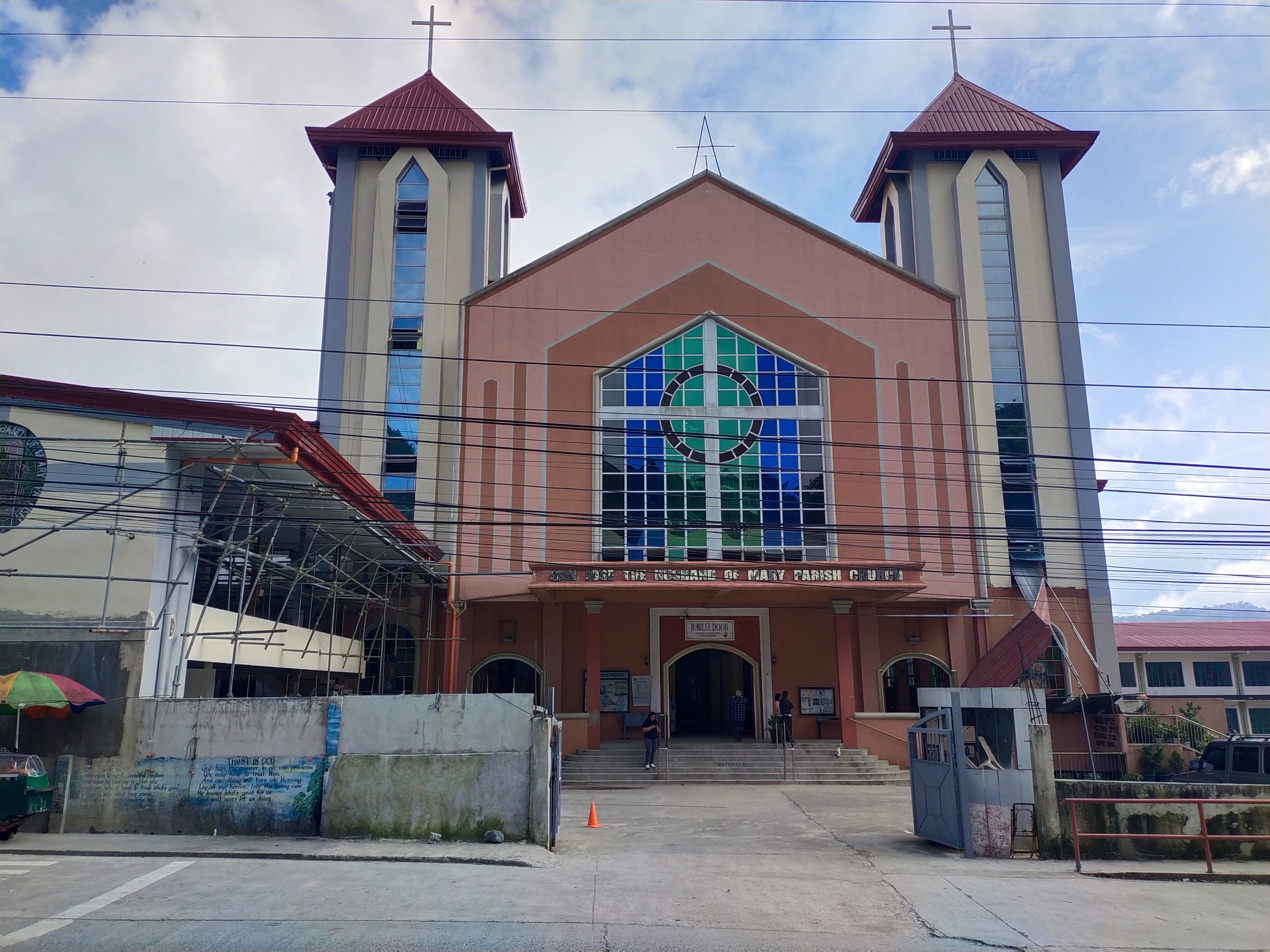
- Church facade in 2024

- Location in Luzon Location in the Philippines
- 16°27′39″N 120°35′12″E
- Location: Poblacion, La Trinidad, Benguet
- Country: Philippines
- Denomination: Roman Catholic

History
- Status: Active
- Founded: 1908
- Dedication: Saint Joseph, Husband of Mary

Architecture
- Architectural type: Church building

Administration
- Province: Nueva Segovia
- Diocese: Baguio
- Parish: San Jose

San Jose the Husband of Mary Parish Church, commonly known as San Jose Parish Church, is a Roman Catholic church located at Poblacion, La Trinidad, Benguet in the Philippines. The church is under the jurisdiction of the Diocese of Baguio, and is dedicated to Saint Joseph, Husband of Mary.

The church was included as one of the 500 Jubilee Churches across the Philippines to mark 500 years of Christianity in the country in 2021.

== Gallery ==
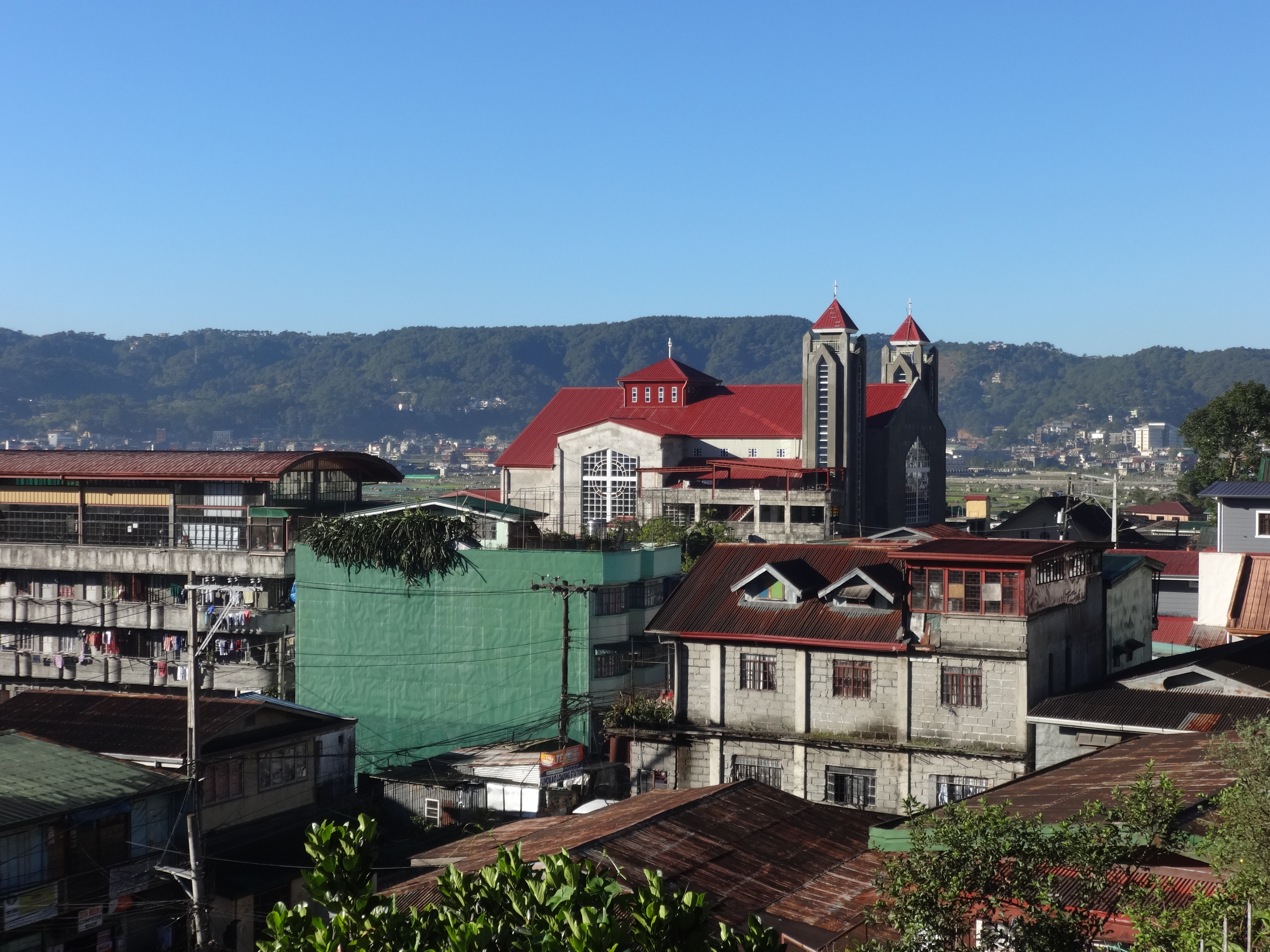
The church (far center) in 2018

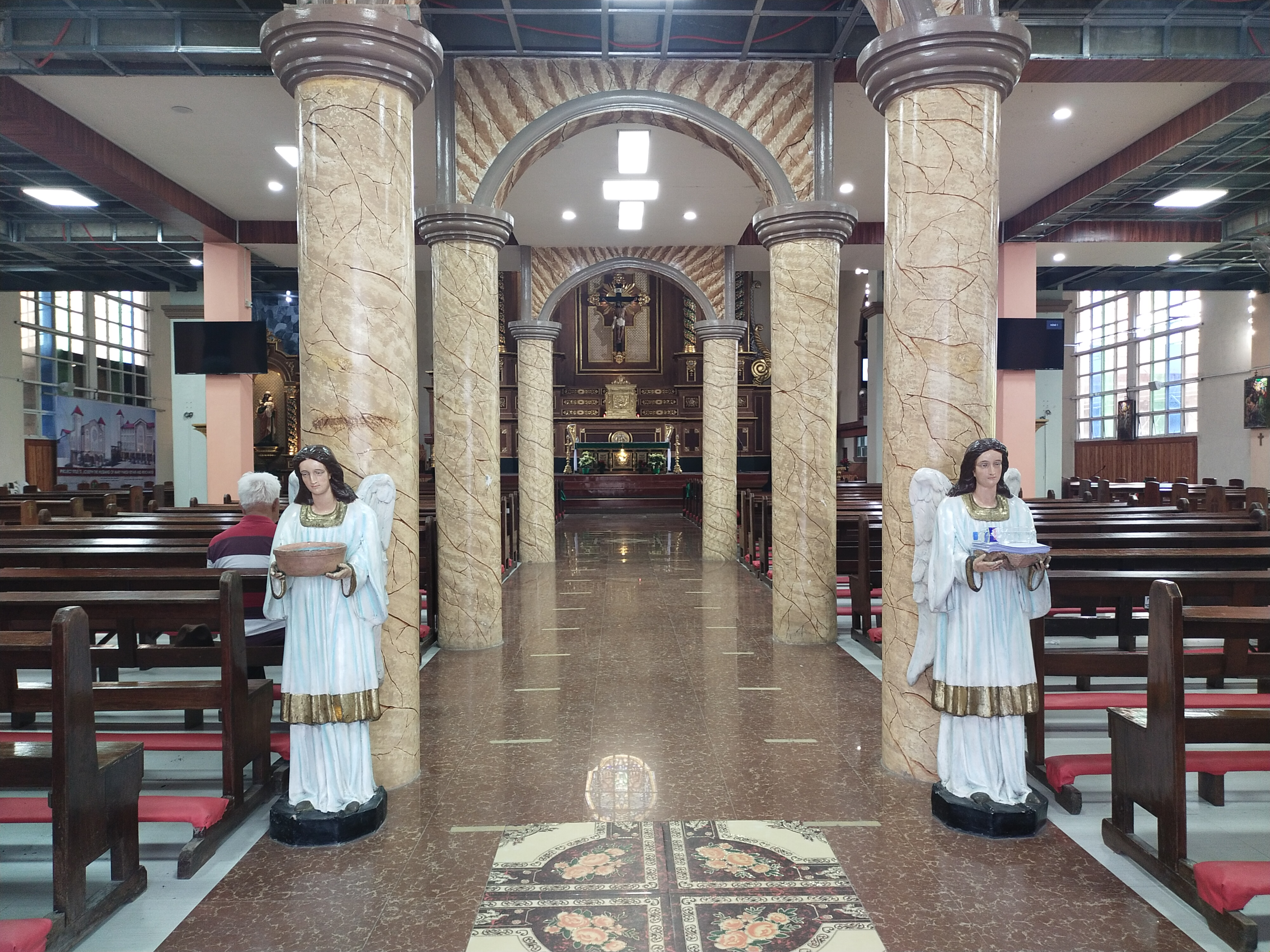
Church interior in 2024

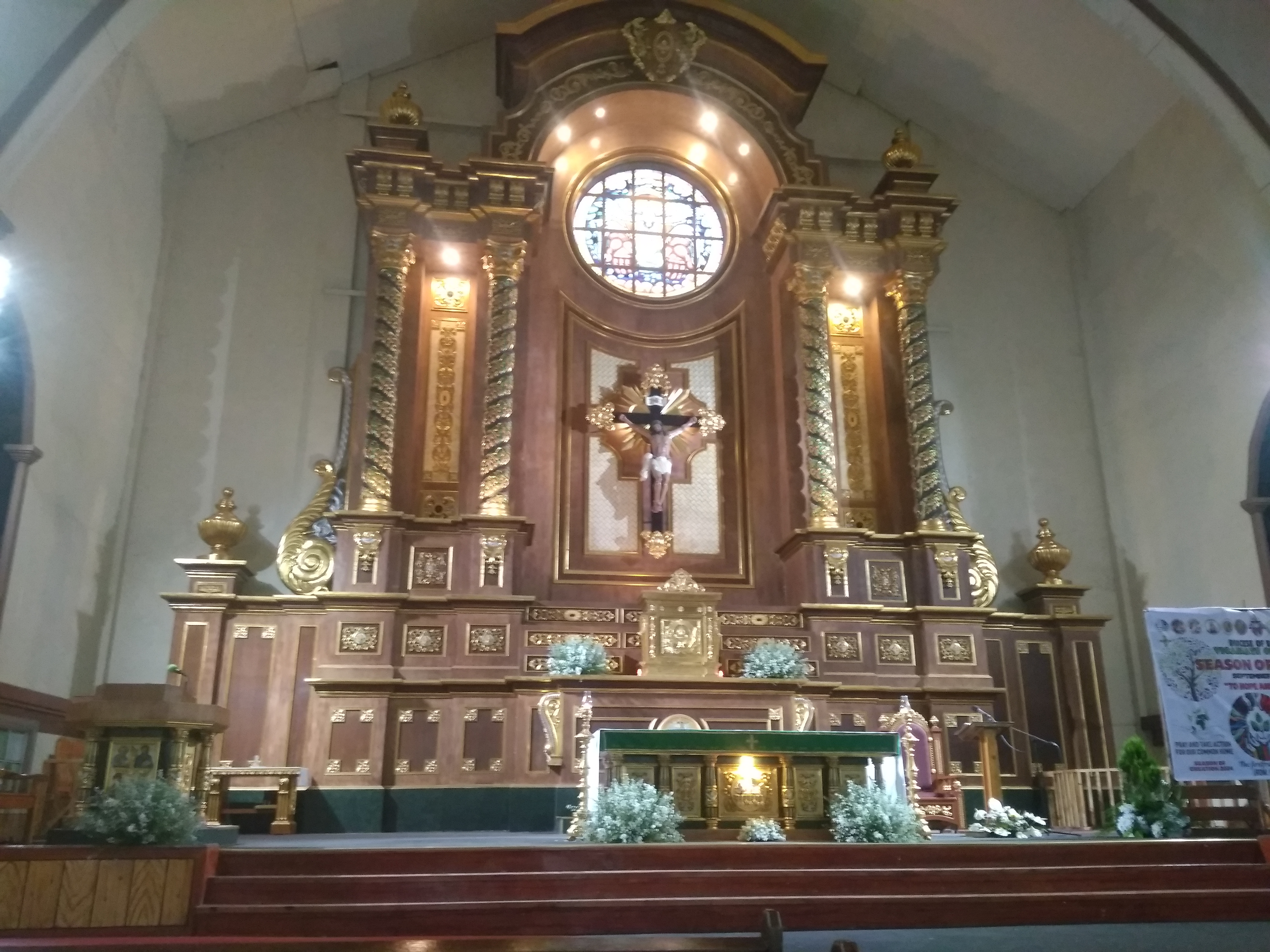
Church sanctuary featuring its main altarpiece
