= La Trinidad, Benguet =

Capital of Benguet, Philippines

La Trinidad
- Municipality
- Municipality of La Trinidad
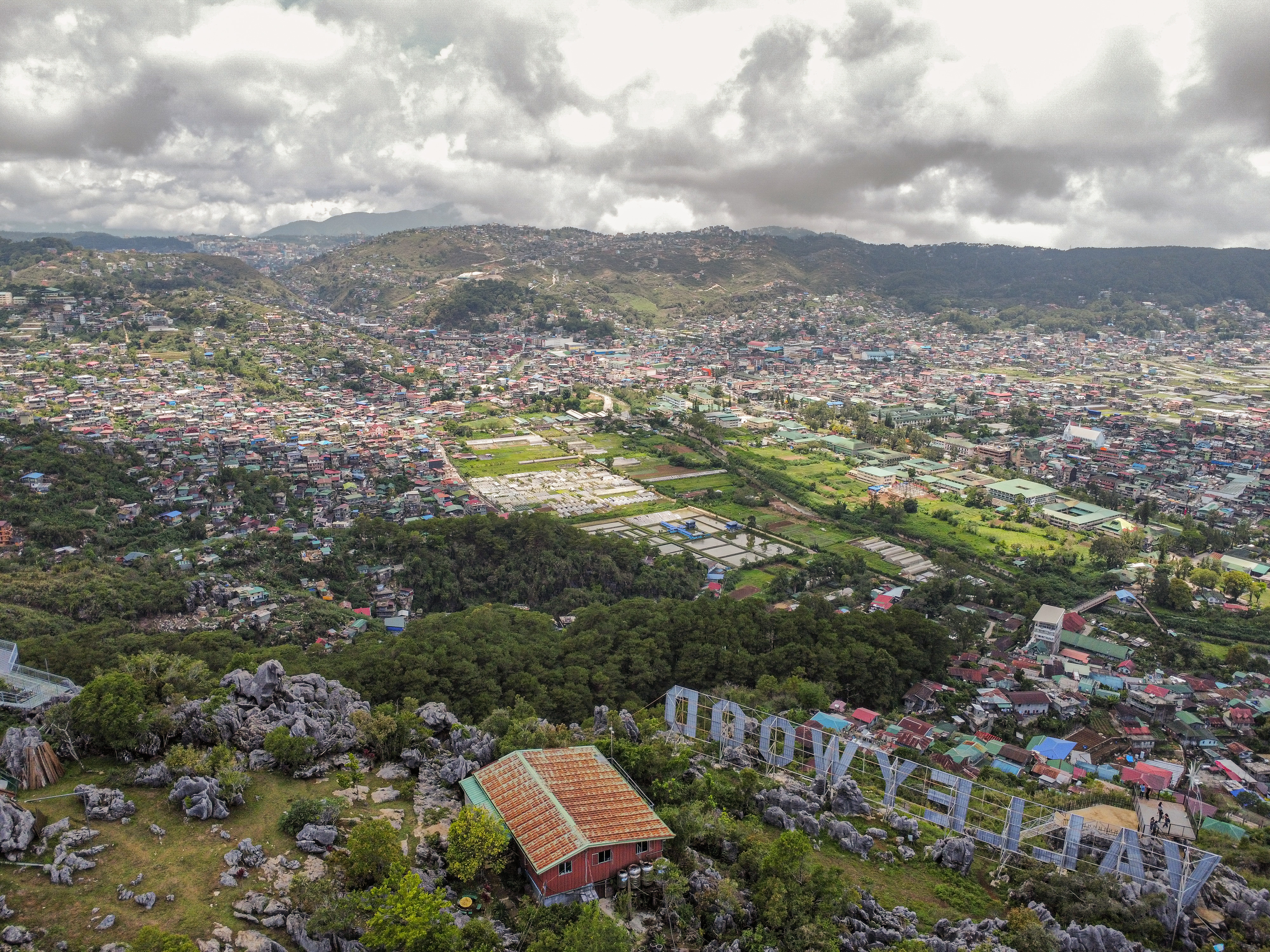

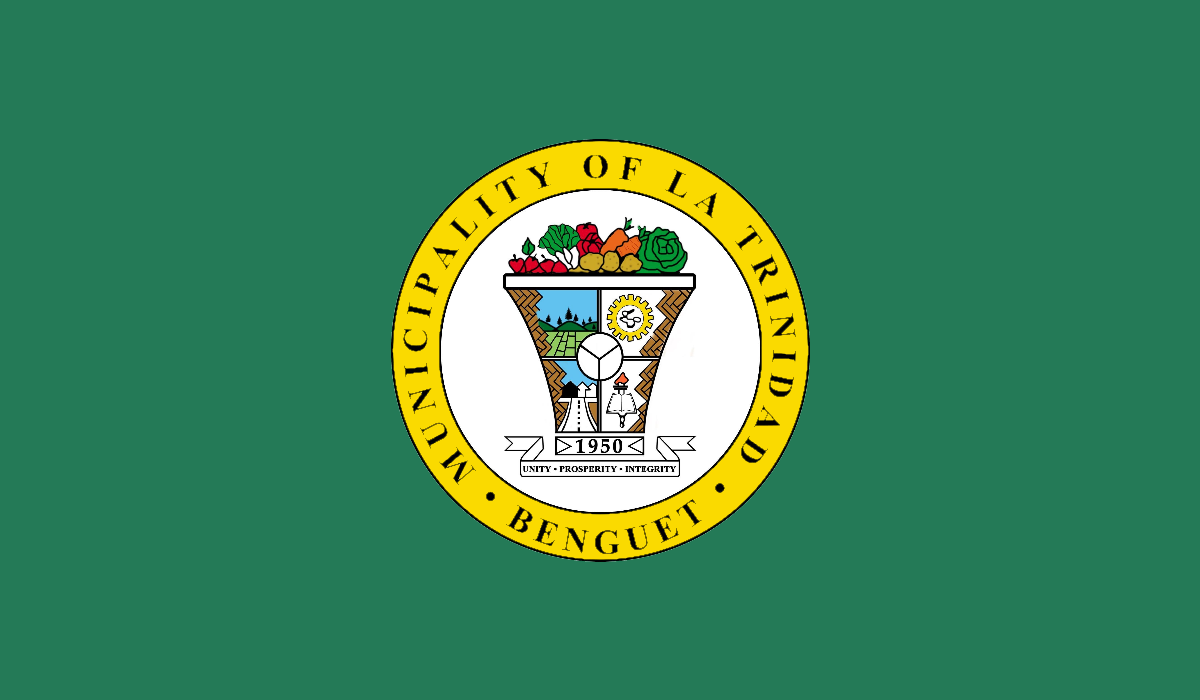
- Flag Seal
- Nicknames: Strawberry Fields of the Philippines; Rose Capital of the Philippines
- Anthem: La Trinidad Hymn
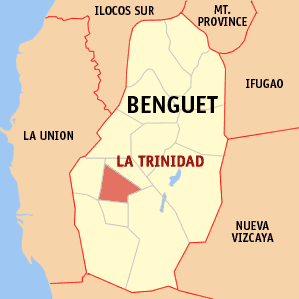
- Map of Benguet with La Trinidad highlighted
- Interactive map of La Trinidad
- Location within the Philippines
- Coordinates: 16°28′N 120°35′E
- Country: Philippines
- Region: Cordillera Administrative Region
- Province: Benguet
- District: Lone district
- Founded: June 16, 1950
- Barangays: 16 (see Barangays)

Government
  - Type: Sangguniang Bayan
  - Mayor: Roderick C. Awingan
  - Vice Mayor: Guiller A. Galwan
  - Representative: Eric Yap
  - Municipal Council: Members: Nestor Fongwan Jr.; Richard D. Wacnisen; Belmer G. Elis; Jayson Dangwa; Bartolome L. Baldas Jr.; Horacio Ramos Jr.; Renato Tereng; Tyrone Diaz
  - Electorate: 54,087 voters (2025)

Area
  - Total: 70.04 km^{2} (27.04 sq mi)
- Elevation: 1,102 m (3,615 ft)
- Highest elevation: 1,820 m (5,970 ft)
- Lowest elevation: 258 m (846 ft)

Population (2024 census)
  - Total: 143,048
  - Density: 2,042/km^{2} (5,290/sq mi)
  - Households: 36,824

Economy
  - Income class: 1st municipal income class
  - Poverty incidence: 2.08% (2023)
  - Revenue: ₱ 791.1 million (2024)
  - Assets: ₱ 2,601 million (2024)
  - Expenditure: ₱ 535.4 million (2024)
  - Liabilities: ₱ 266.2 million (2024)

Service provider
  - Electricity: Benguet Electric Cooperative (BENECO)
- Time zone: UTC+8 (PST)
- ZIP code: 2601
- PSGC: 1401110000
- IDD : area code: +63 (0)74
- Native languages: Kankanaey; Ibaloi; Ilocano; Tagalog

La Trinidad ([lɐ tɾinɪˈdɐd]), officially the Municipality of La Trinidad (Ilocano: Ili ti La Trinidad; Tagalog: Bayan ng La Trinidad), is a municipality and capital of the province of Benguet, Philippines. According to the 2024 census, it has a population of 143,048 people.

The town is known for its strawberry fields, earning the title "Strawberry Fields of the Philippines". The municipality is within the Metro Baguio area.

== Etymology ==
The town's name is the Spanish La Trinidad, referring to the Most Blessed Trinity.

== History ==
=== Spanish period ===
The valley encompassing La Trinidad was originally called "Benguet", a thriving community of Ibaloi migrants from Tinek. Natives traded local products, which included gold, with nearby lowland towns that already had Dominican and Augustinian missions established. In around 1616, Procurator-General of Manila, Hernándo de los Ríos Coronel, became interested in the mountains' gold and proposed to expedite its search to King Philip IV of Spain. He wrote in December 1618 to both Alonso Fajardo, the Governor of Manila, and Miguel García Serrano, the Archbishop of Manila, that it was the solution to both the abandoned missions as well as the depleted colonial treasury. Fajardo requested feedback from the religious orders on this matter; whether waging a war against the Igorots was just. Only the Jesuits objected to the war, preferring only that their "mines be occupied in the name of His Majesty".

In 1620, Fajardo sent the first expedition under Captain García Aldana y Cabrera, Governor of Pangasinan. Aldana and his men took the route from Aringay, crossing the Naguilian River to Duplas (now in La Union), then followed the Bornotan (Santo Rosario) River eventually reaching Takdian. Upon arriving at the mining community of Bua, the men found only a recently burned village, suggesting the natives fled with nothing for them to plunder. Aldana examined the Antamok mines and was able to gather some gold.

A second expedition was sent in 1623 under the command of Sergeant Major Antonio Carreño de Valdés. Carreño was able to repel some Igorot assaults, building two forts; 'Fort Santiago' overlooking the present Santo Nino mines, and 'Fort del Rosario' in the Antamok-Itogon area. The Igorots submitted to Spanish authorities, only to strike back when the rainy season made it difficult to send manpower and new supplies, prompting the Spaniards to retreat.

Finally, in 1624, Fajardo sent Captain Alonso Martín Quirante, a master of strategy, logistics and tactics. In February of that year, Quirante took off with a huge expedition of 1,903 soldiers, carpenters, miners, smiths, slaves, clerks and some requisite clergy. He divided his large force into three; the first to clear the road, the second to follow, and the third with rations and arms. This ensured they would reach the mining area after clearing out an Igorot fort along the way. Quirante was able to reach the mining areas, and discovered about two hundred abandoned houses, implying the locals fled beforehand. He rebuilt Fort Santiago, and examined five mines, four of which showed signs of having been abandoned by the Igorots: Arisey Bugayona, Baranaban, Antamog, and Conog. The fifth mine called Galan was still operational. Quirante ordered baskets of ore gathered from each mine, labeled and ready for assaying. The results showed no evidence of deposits rich enough to yield attractive profit, prompting Quirante to return to Manila with 400 baskets of ore to be sent to Mexico for further assaying.

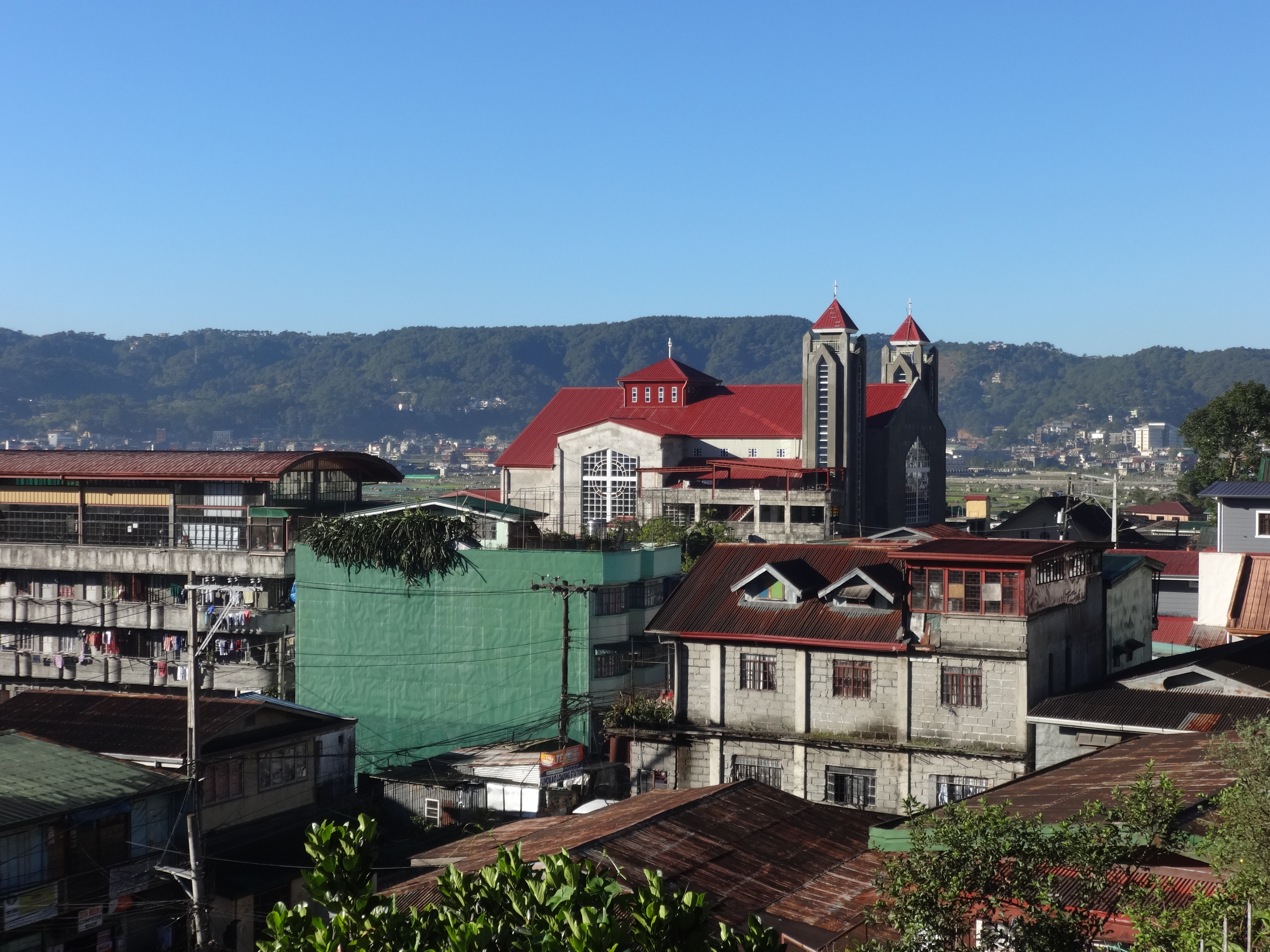
San Jose Parish Church (center) in Barangay Poblacion

Meanwhile, the Real Audiencia had become concerned at the expense of the project which had already cost 33,982 pesos. Don Gerónimo Silva took over the government, convening the council to decide on the issue. The Real Audiencia decided to abandon the project because of mounting expenses, loss of life and the continued hostility of the Igorots and their land.

In 1829, another expedition was sent to Benguet under Guillermo Galvey.

Although the District of Benguet was established in La Trinidad by 1846, it was only on April 21, 1874, under Commandant Manuel Scheidnagel, the Valle de Benguet was renamed Valle de La Trinidad (La Trinidad Valley). Despite popular acceptance that it was named as "a fitting tribute to Galvey’s wife - Doña Trinidad de Galvey" – recent research has revealed that credit should have probably gone to Scheidnagel, having been inspired by the three prominent adjacent hills evoking the Holy Trinity overlooking the Población church, where the Cabecera (seat of government) was established.

Together with 40 smaller surrounding rancherías, La Trinidad was placed under the jurisdiction of the newly established Benguet commandancia político-militar in 1846 and was established as its administrative headquarters during the Spanish Conquest of the Philippines.

=== American period ===
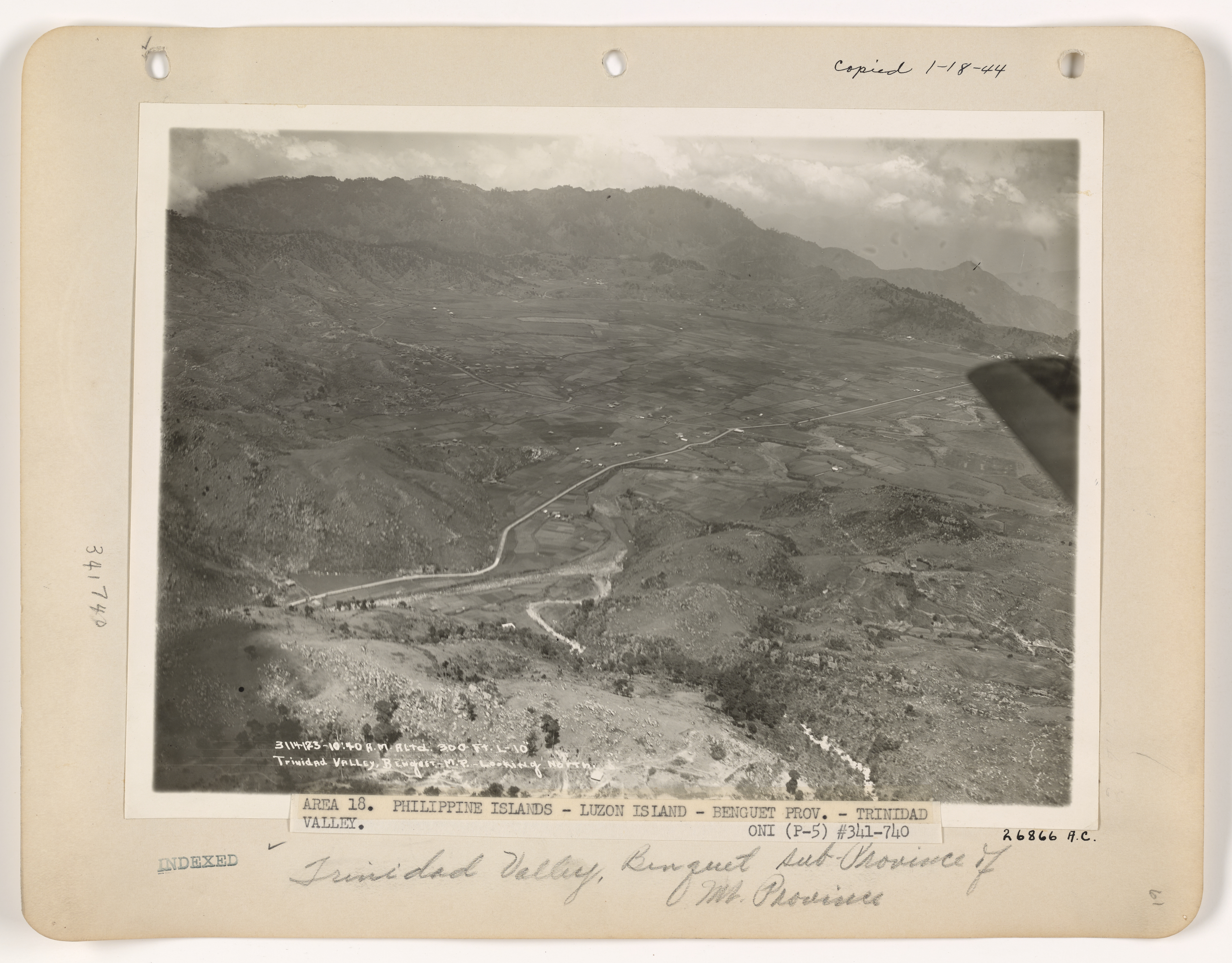
Aerial view of La Trinidad, looking northwards, March 1923.

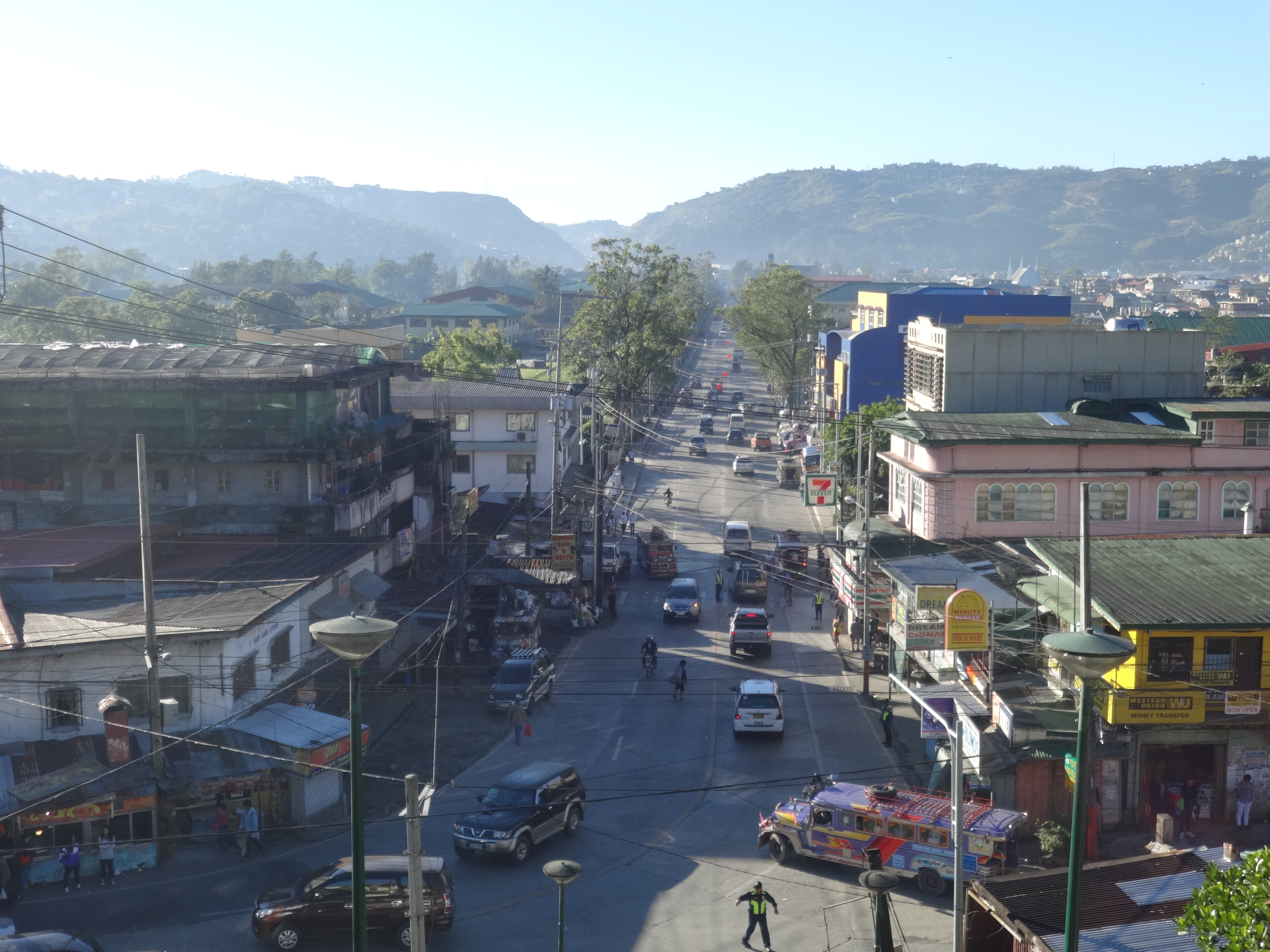
La Trinidad valley as viewed from the Benguet Provincial Capitol

During the Philippine Revolution, in July 1898, Filipino revolutionary forces under the Ibaloi chieftain Juan Cariño and Pedro Paterno liberated La Trinidad from the Spaniards and took over the government, proclaiming Benguet as province of the new Philippine Republic, and La Trinidad as its capital.

In 1900, the American colonizers arrived, and La Trinidad was established as one of the 19 townships under the Benguet province upon the issuance of Act No. 48. For a brief period, Baguio was the capital of Benguet when appointed Benguet province civil governor H.P. Whitmarsh moved the seat of government from La Trinidad to Baguio in 1901. La Trinidad was again the provincial capital in 1909 after Baguio was converted from a township into a chartered city.

=== Second World War ===
On May 3, 1945, Filipino soldiers of the 66th Infantry Regiment, Philippine Commonwealth Army, USAFIP-NL, liberated La Trinidad for Imperial Japanese occupation.

=== Modern history ===
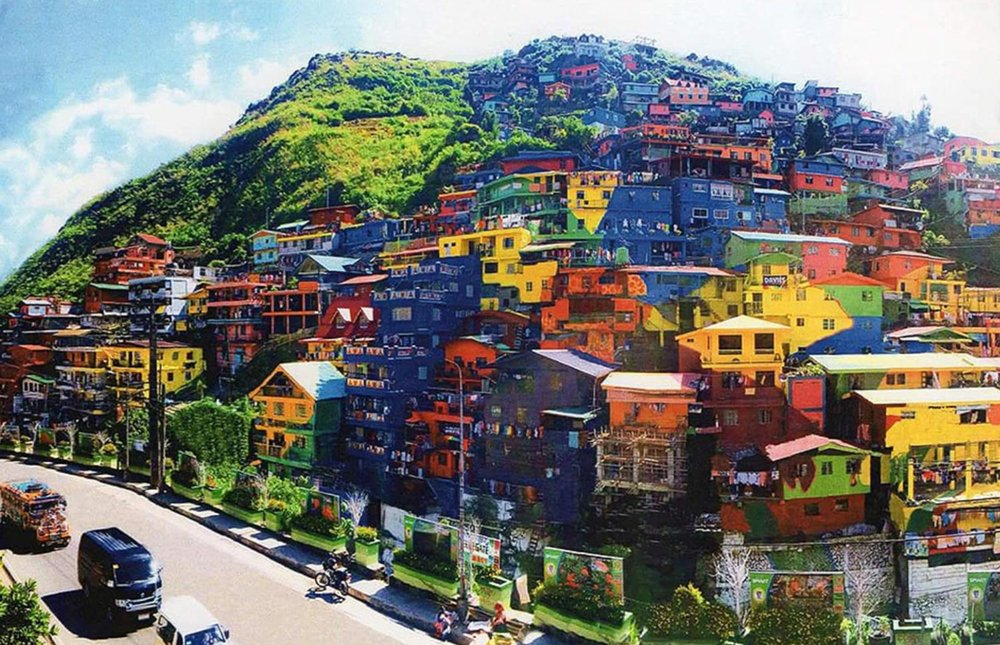
StoBoSa Hillside Homes Artwork

La Trinidad was transformed into a full-fledged town from its former status as municipal district by virtue of Republic Act No. 531, approved June 16, 1950.

On June 23, 2016, La Trinidad was highlighted in the media when the first and largest community artwork in the Philippines, the STOBOSA Hillside Homes Artwork was unveiled, featuring hillside houses in the sitios of Stonehill, Botiwtiw and Sadjap of Barangay Balili, all painted with sunflowers and multicoloured abstract designs.

== Geography ==
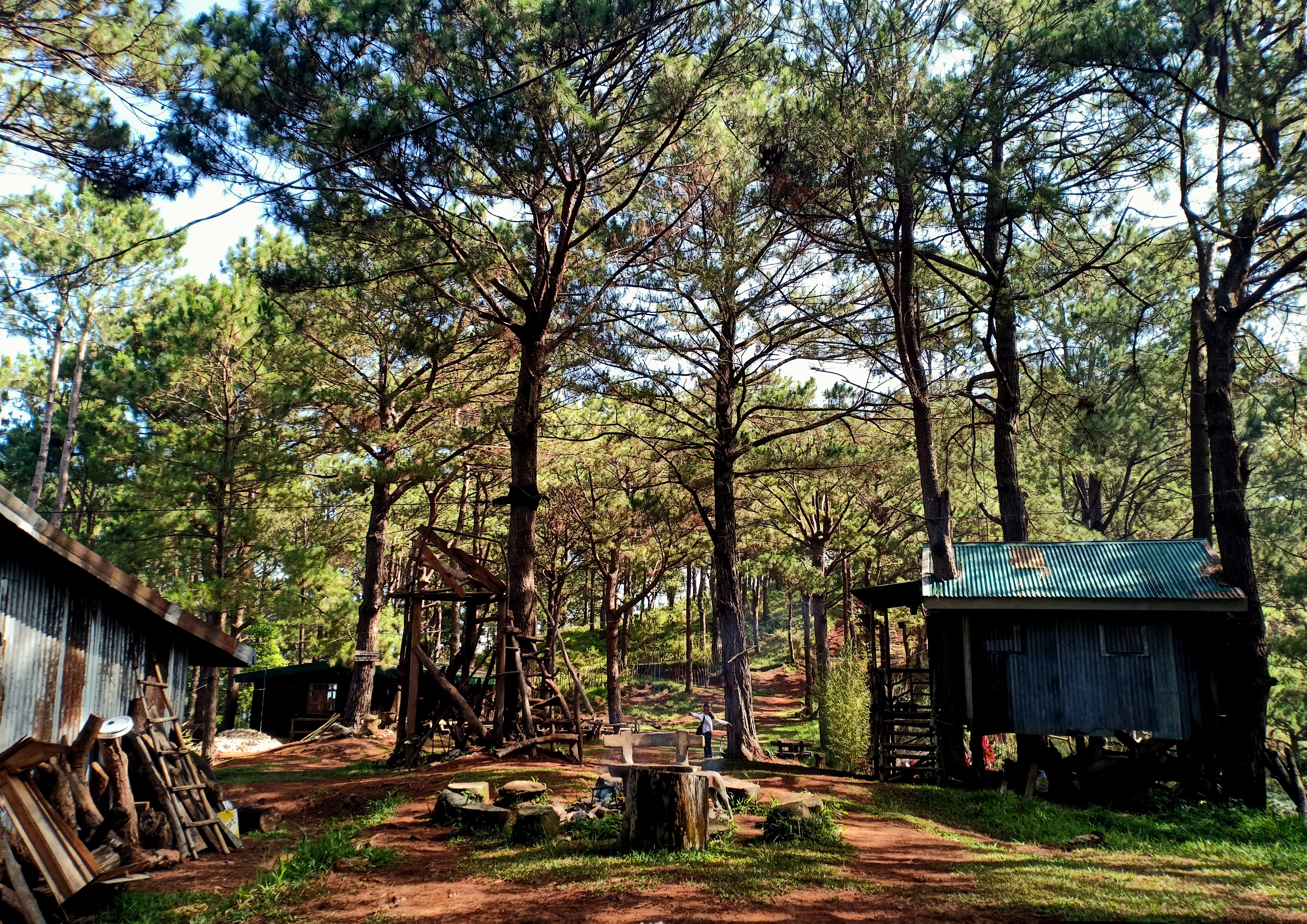
Pine trees within Mount Kalugong Eco-Park

La Trinidad is located at 16°28′N 120°35′E, at the central portion of Benguet. It is bounded by Tublay on the north-east, Sablan on the west, Baguio on the south, Itogon on the southeast, and Tuba on the south-west.

According to the Philippine Statistics Authority, the municipality has a land area of 70.04 square kilometres (27.04 sq mi) constituting 2.53% of the 2,769.08-square-kilometre- (1,069.15 sq mi) total area of Benguet.

The terrain is generally mountainous with springs, rivers and creeks. The town has a valley which encompasses several barangays. The valley floor elevation is at 1,300 metres (4,300 ft) above sea level. Elevation ranges from 500 to 1,700 metres (1,600 to 5,600 ft) above sea level.

The Balili River is the municipality's main water drainage which carries upstream water from the Sagudin River in Baguio. The river merges with another upstream river in Tuel upon reaching the La Trinidad-Tublay-Sablan tri-point.

La Trinidad is situated 253.91 kilometres (157.77 mi) from the country's capital city of Manila.

=== Climate ===
Climate data for La Trinidad, Benguet
| Month | Jan | Feb | Mar | Apr | May | Jun | Jul | Aug | Sep | Oct | Nov | Dec | Year |
|---|---|---|---|---|---|---|---|---|---|---|---|---|---|
| Mean daily maximum °C (°F) | 22 (72) | 23 (73) | 24 (75) | 25 (77) | 24 (75) | 23 (73) | 22 (72) | 21 (70) | 21 (70) | 22 (72) | 23 (73) | 22 (72) | 23 (73) |
| Mean daily minimum °C (°F) | 12 (54) | 12 (54) | 14 (57) | 16 (61) | 17 (63) | 16 (61) | 16 (61) | 16 (61) | 16 (61) | 15 (59) | 14 (57) | 12 (54) | 15 (59) |
| Average precipitation mm (inches) | 15 (0.6) | 16 (0.6) | 24 (0.9) | 33 (1.3) | 102 (4.0) | 121 (4.8) | 177 (7.0) | 165 (6.5) | 144 (5.7) | 170 (6.7) | 56 (2.2) | 23 (0.9) | 1,046 (41.2) |
| Average rainy days | 6.3 | 6.6 | 9.5 | 12.8 | 20.6 | 23.5 | 25.4 | 23.4 | 23.2 | 21.4 | 14.0 | 8.2 | 194.9 |
Source: Meteoblue

La Trinidad has a dry-winter subtropical highland climate (Köppen climate classification: Cwb), featuring a menacing wet season.

La Trinidad belongs under the Type I climate by the Coronas System of classification with distinct wet and dry seasons. The dry season lasts from November to April, while the wet season occurs during the rest of the year. The climate is cool, with temperatures ranging from 11.7 °C (53.1 °F) during the month of December at its coldest and 23.2 °C (73.8 °F) at its warmest during the months of March, April and May. The average daily temperature is 18.55 °C (65.39 °F), and its wind velocity is 1.43. During the rainiest month of August, the rainfall average is 850.70 millimetres (33.492 in).

=== Barangays ===
La Trinidad is politically subdivided into 16 barangays., with 11 classified as urban and 5 as rural. Each barangay consists of puroks and some have sitios.

As of 2015, the most populous is Pico with 23,282 people, while Bineng, with 1,624 people, has the least. Wangal is the largest in terms of land area, while Cruz is the smallest. Balili was the most densely populated, and Bineng was the least. Bineng has the most number of sitios, while Betag has the least with only 4.

| Barangay | Class | Etymology | Historical component of | Area | Population (2015) | Density (2015) | No. of sitios |
|---|---|---|---|---|---|---|---|
| Alapang | Rural | Ibaloi: Adafang – "powdery substance from limestone" | Alno (until 1967) | 2.01 km^{2} (0.78 sq mi) | 4,477 (3.5%) | 2,200/km^{2} (5,700/sq mi) | 5: Alapang Proper; Camp Dangwa; Dapiting; Ettong; Samoyao |
| Alno | Rural | Alno – local term for a medicinal dipterocarp tree in the area | Bahong | 9.58 km^{2} (3.70 sq mi) | 2,883 (2.2%) | 300/km^{2} (780/sq mi) | 13: Bekes; Central Alno; Conig; Doakan; Induyan; Mati-e; Obudan; Ongasan; Payew; Peril; Riverside; Roadside; Taytay |
| Ambiong | Urban | Ibaloi: Ambiongan – "Black Carpet Bees" found in the rolling hills and forests | Eastern Pico (until 1948) | 3.42 km^{2} (1.32 sq mi) | 7,149 (5.5%) | 2,100/km^{2} (5,400/sq mi) | 7: Botiwtiw; Central Ambiong; Gulon; Paltingan; Parapad; Riverside; Upper Ambiong |
| Bahong | Urban | Ibaloi: Pesjohong (or naydihong) – "hollow or bowl like" | Tacdian | 6.58 km^{2} (2.54 sq mi) | 5,188 (4.0%) | 790/km^{2} (2,000/sq mi) | 5: Anoding; Central Bahong; Ma-e; Sadag; Tomay |
| Balili | Urban | Ibaloi: Badili – a type of grass abundant in the area | Pico | 1.19 km^{2} (0.46 sq mi) | 18,962 (14.7%) | 16,000/km^{2} (41,000/sq mi) | 11: Botiwtiw; Cabanao; Central Balili; Little Flower; Luboc; Mamaga; Pinespark; Sadjap/ Bell Church; Stonehill; Tabangaoen; Tebteb |
| Beckel | Urban | — | Pico | 9.51 km^{2} (3.67 sq mi) | 3,918 (3.0%) | 410/km^{2} (1,100/sq mi) | 13: Bakong; Balangbang; Busi; Cawat; Central Beckel; Gongel; Lamut; Linusod; Marlboro; Obulan; Pagal; Peril; Sapsing |
| Bineng | Rural | Nabneng – local term characterizing the natural damming by the Danao River | Disdis (present-day Sablan) | 8.25 km^{2} (3.19 sq mi) | 1,624 (1.3%) | 200/km^{2} (520/sq mi) | 16: Alumit; Aminit; Bacca; Balangabang; Bodiweng; Botilao; Central Bineng; Cojuran; Corus; Hilltop; Japos; Kagiskis; Nawal; Nayuno; Shalushan; Suwi |
| Betag | Urban | Betag – a flat land area characterizing the terrain | Pico (until the 1950s) | 1.57 km^{2} (0.61 sq mi) | 9,747 (7.5%) | 6,200/km^{2} (16,000/sq mi) | 4: Zone 1 (IA); Zone 2 (IB); Zone 3 (IC); Zone 4 (ID) |
| Cruz | Urban | Spanish: Cruz – Cross | Alapang (until 1971) | 0.56 km^{2} (0.22 sq mi) | 3,721 (2.9%) | 6,600/km^{2} (17,000/sq mi) | 7: Atta; Baa-yan; Kangas; Lower Cruz; Oliweg; Samoyao; Upper Cruz |
| Lubas | Urban | Ibaloi: Dubas – "red clay" abundant in the area | Pico | 2.40 km^{2} (0.93 sq mi) | 6,159 (4.8%) | 2,600/km^{2} (6,700/sq mi) | 6: Guitley; Inselbeg; Lubas Proper; Pipingew; Rocky Side 1; Rocky Side 2 |
| Pico | Urban | Ibaloi: Piho – "pick mattock" inhabitants used to flatten the hilly land | — | 3.29 km^{2} (1.27 sq mi) | 23,282 (18.0%) | 7,100/km^{2} (18,000/sq mi) | 8: Balangabang; Bayabas; Cogcoga; Dreamland-Piripin Bato; Km. 4; Km. 5; Shamolog; Toyong |
| Poblacion | Urban | Spanish: Poblacion – the site of the old Spanish Presidencia | Benget | 1.05 km^{2} (0.41 sq mi) | 13,196 (10.2%) | 13,000/km^{2} (34,000/sq mi) | 5: Central Buyagan; Eastern Buyagan; Town Proper; Upper Kesbeng; Western Buyagan |
| Puguis | Rural | — | Pico (until the 1950s) | 10.22 km^{2} (3.95 sq mi) | 9,038 (7.0%) | 880/km^{2} (2,300/sq mi) | 7: Ampasit; Buhao; Guadayan; Lamtang; Longlong; Proper Puguis; Wayside |
| Shilan | Urban | Shalan – local term for "the way to and from" | Tacdian | 7.51 km^{2} (2.90 sq mi) | 4,833 (3.7%) | 640/km^{2} (1,700/sq mi) | 8: Balukas; Cavanao; Jappa; Pagal; Sabdang; Sagpawe; Shilan 1; Shilan 2 |
| Tawang | Urban | Kankanaey: Tawang – "catching birds through the use of fire inside the cave" or Ibaloi: Tayawan – "tayaw" ritual inside the Tawang caves | parts of Pico, Alapang and Shilan | 2.48 km^{2} (0.96 sq mi) | 9,014 (7.0%) | 3,600/km^{2} (9,300/sq mi) | 6: Banig; Boted; Central Tawang; Dengsi; Papasok; Tayawan |
| Wangal | Rural | Ibaloi: Vangal – Ibaloi term attributed to the river | — | 11.16 km^{2} (4.31 sq mi) | 5,942 (4.6%) | 530/km^{2} (1,400/sq mi) | 5: Gayasi; Lower Wangal; Sadjatan; Talinguroy; Upper Wangal |
Dashes (—) in cells indicate unavailable information.

== Demographics ==
Population census of La Trinidad
| Year | Pop. | ±% p.a. |
|---|---|---|
| 1903 | 267 | — |
| 1918 | 3,013 | +17.53% |
| 1939 | 6,554 | +3.77% |
| 1948 | 7,994 | +2.23% |
| 1960 | 12,415 | +3.74% |
| 1970 | 18,551 | +4.09% |
| 1975 | 22,732 | +4.16% |
| 1980 | 28,713 | +4.78% |
| 1990 | 48,523 | +5.39% |
| 1995 | 63,089 | +5.04% |
| 2000 | 67,963 | +1.61% |
| 2007 | 97,810 | +5.15% |
| 2010 | 107,188 | +3.39% |
| 2015 | 129,133 | +3.61% |
| 2020 | 137,404 | +1.32% |
| 2024 | 142,925 | +0.95% |
Source: Philippine Statistics Authority

In the 2024 census, La Trinidad had a population of 142,925 people. The population density was 2,000 inhabitants per square kilometre (5,200/sq mi).

=== Languages ===
The residents of La Trinidad speak Ibaloi and Kankanaey. Ilocano is also used as a lingua franca in the municipality.

== Economy ==
Poverty incidence of La Trinidad (%)

Source: Philippine Statistics Authority

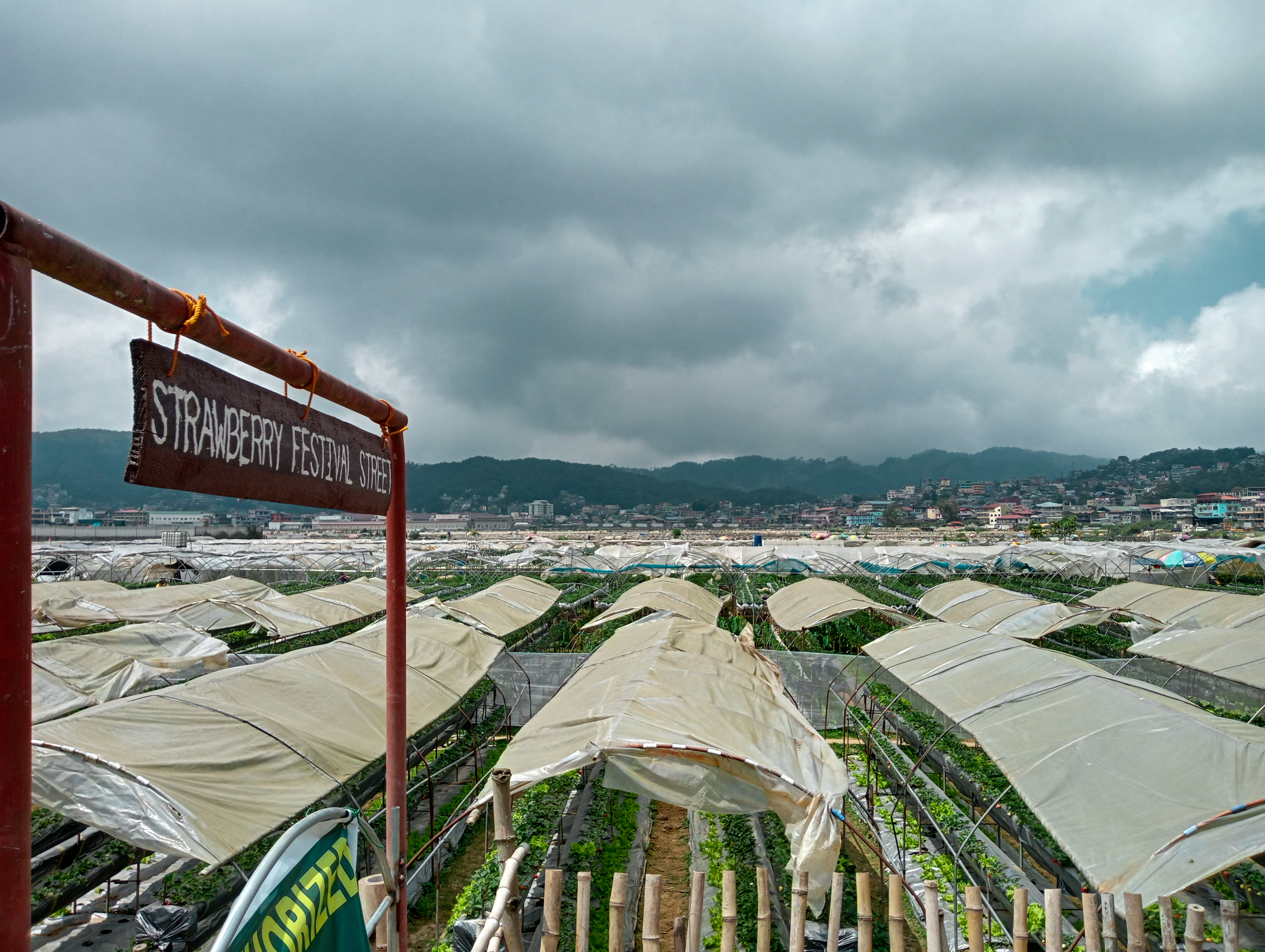
Strawberry fields within the La Trinidad Valley

La Trinidad supplies most of the Philippines' strawberries and cut flowers, which include roses. The La Trinidad Vegetable Trading Post is visited by wholesalers and traders of vegetables from other provinces. The presence of the Benguet State University in the municipality serves as a boost to agricultural research and development in the region.

The town landed on the Guinness Book of World Records for baking the world's largest strawberry shortcake, at 21,213.40 pounds (9,622.24 kg), at the La Trinidad Strawberry Festival on March 20, 2004.

Its proximity to the city of Baguio attracts tourists, primarily to the strawberry fields in the valley, and lesser to the Benguet Provincial Capitol and the Rose Gardens of barangay Bahong.

== Government ==
=== Local government ===
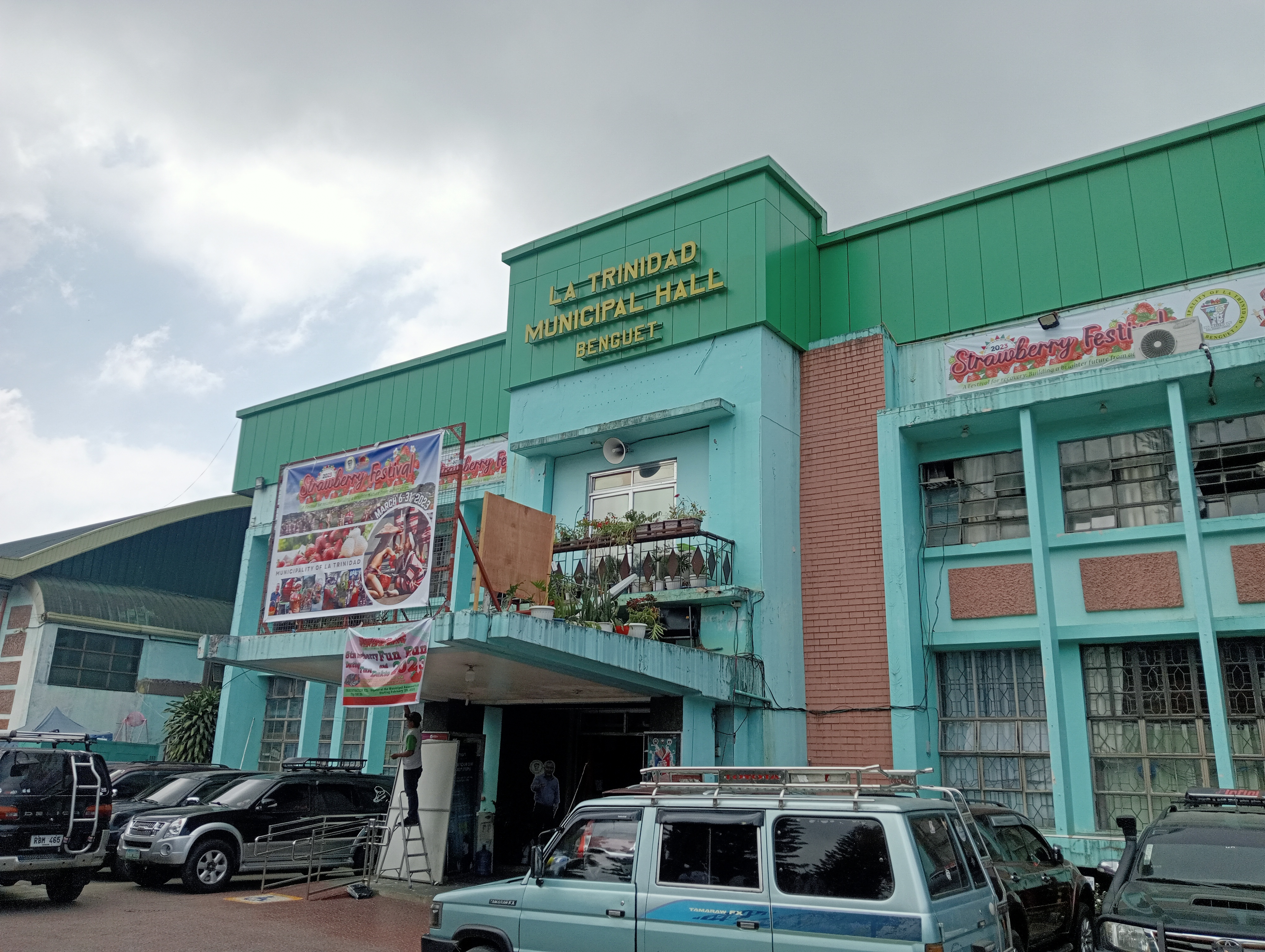
La Trinidad Municipal Hall

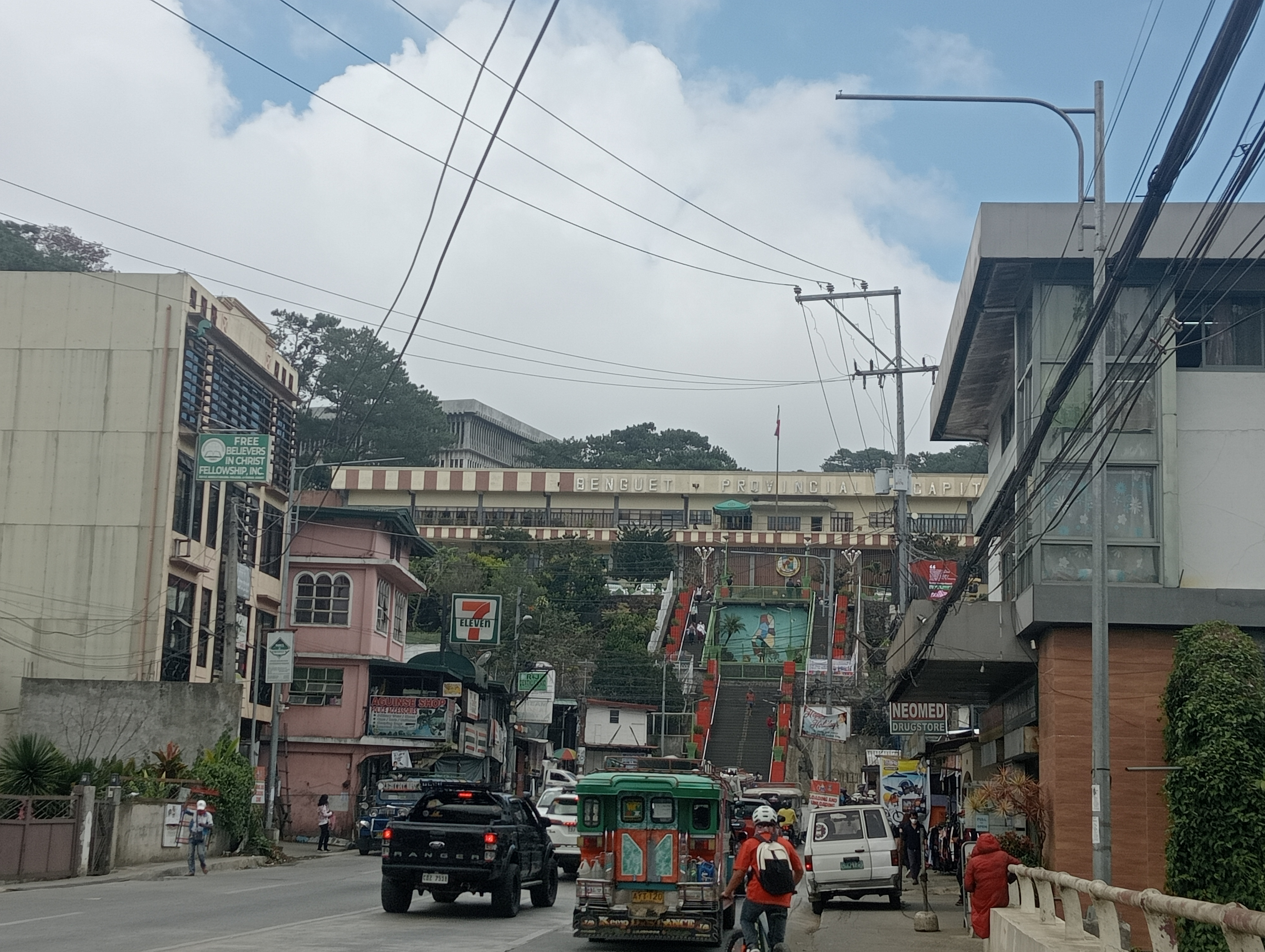
Benguet Provincial Capitol

La Trinidad, belonging to the lone congressional district of the province of Benguet, is governed by a mayor designated as its local chief executive and by a municipal council as its legislative body in accordance with the Local Government Code. The mayor, vice mayor, and the councilors are elected directly by the people through an election which is being held every three years.

=== Elected officials ===
Members of the Municipal Council (2025-2028)
| Position | Name |
|---|---|
| Congressman | Eric G. Yap |
| Mayor | Roderick C. Awingan |
| Vice-Mayor | Guiller A. Galwan |
| Councilors | Renato B. Tereng |
| Councilors | Jayson C. Dangwa |
| Councilors | Nestor T. Fongwan Jr. |
| Councilors | Belmer G. Elis |
| Councilors | Tyrone T. Diaz |
| Councilors | Bartolome L. Baldas Jr. |
| Councilors | Horacio A. Ramos Jr. |
| Councilors | Richard D. Wacnisen |
| ABC President | Jonie S. Puroc |
| SK Federation President | Frederick D. Guzman |

== Education ==
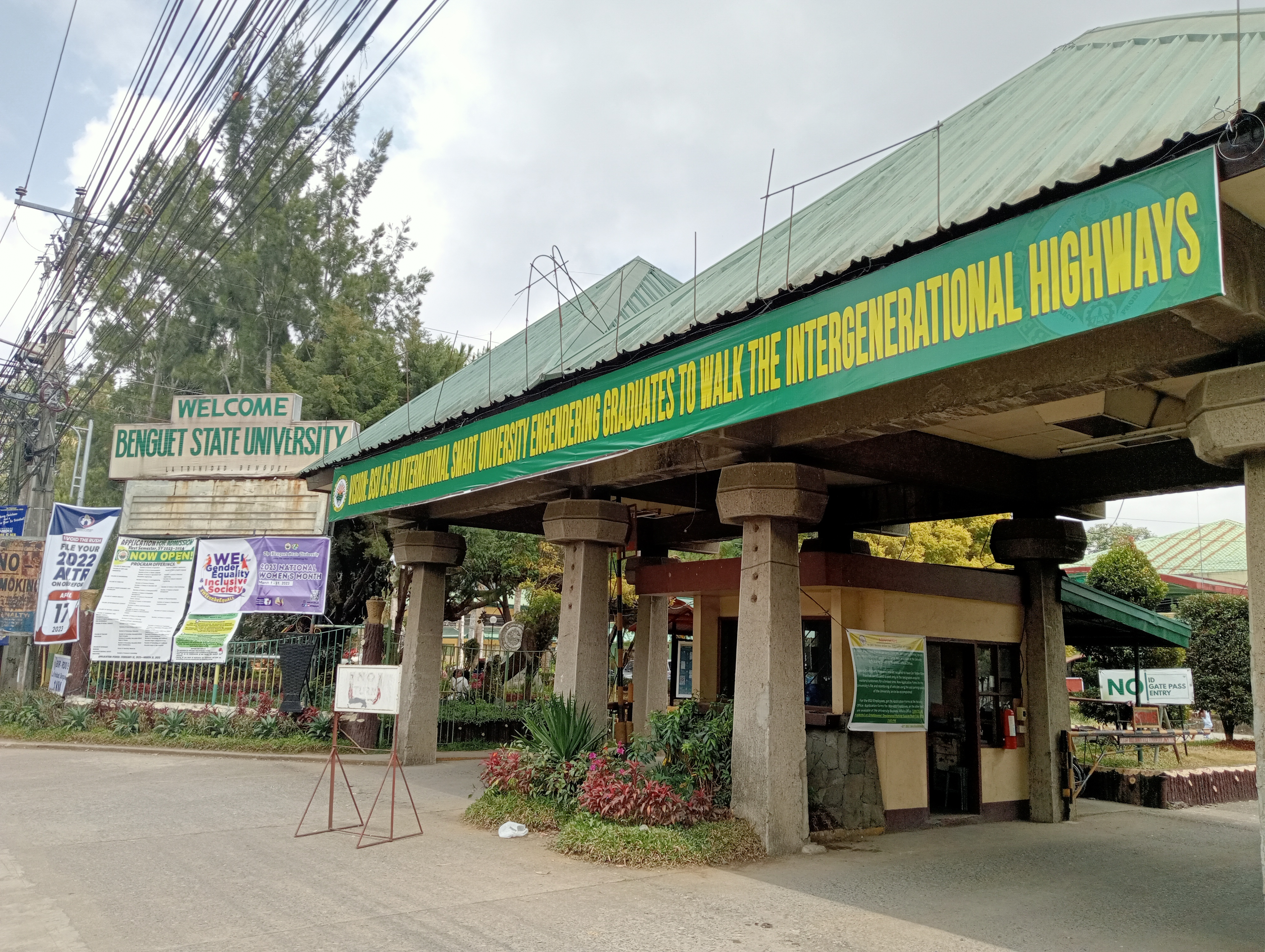
Benguet State University

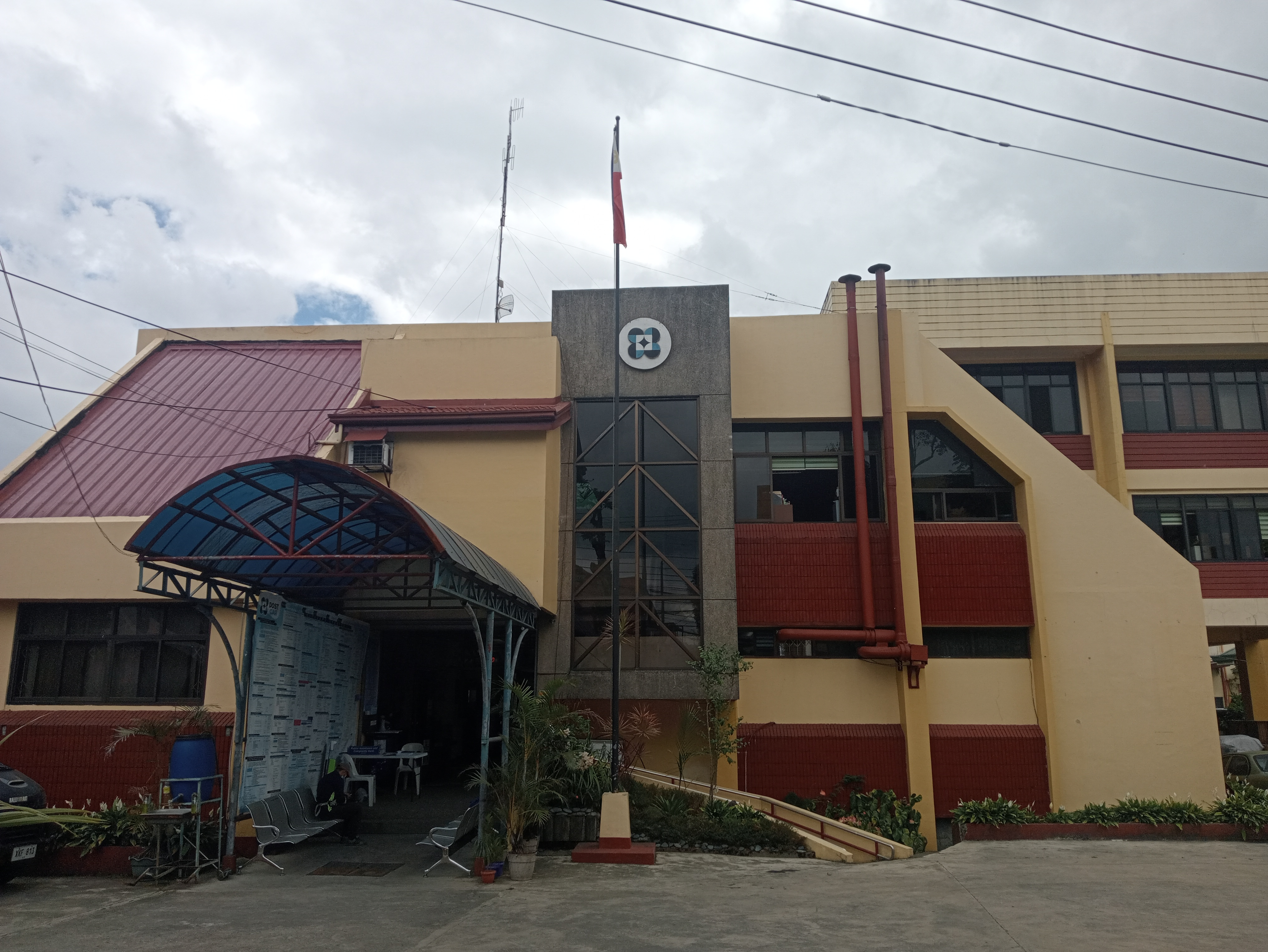
DOST Regional Office - CAR

The La Trinidad Schools District Office governs all educational institutions within the municipality. It oversees the management and operations of all private and public, from primary to secondary schools. La Trinidad, aside from the adjacent city of Baguio, is the center of higher education in Benguet province.

=== Public schools ===
As of 2014, La Trinidad has 23 public elementary schools and 7 public secondary schools.

The main campus of Benguet State University, the first university in the province, is located in the municipality.

Elementary (2013-2014)
| School | Barangay |
|---|---|
| Alapang-Camp Dangwa Elementary School | Alapang |
| Alno-Kadoorie Elementary School | Alno |
| Ambiong Elementary School | Ambiong |
| Bahong Elementary School | Bahong |
| Balili Elementary School | Balili |
| Balukas Elementary School | Shilan |
| Beckel Elementary School | Beckel |
| Benguet SPED Center | Wangal |
| Bineng Elementary School | Bineng |
| Bodiweng Elementary School | Bineng |
| Buyagan Elementary School | Poblacion |
| La Trinidad Central School | Poblacion |
| Lamtang Elementary School | Puguis |
| Lamut Elementary School | Beckel |
| Longlong Elementary School | Puguis |
| Lubas Elementary School | Lubas |
| Pagal Elementary School | Shilan |
| Pico Elementary School | Pico |
| Puguis Elementary School | Puguis |
| Tacdian Elementary School | Shilan |
| Talinguroy Elementary School | Wangal |
| Tawang Elementary School | Tawang |
| Wangal Elementary School | Wangal |

Secondary (2013-2014)
| School | Barangay |
|---|---|
| Benguet National High School | Wangal |
| Benguet National High School - Alno Annex | Alno |
| Benguet National High School - Bineng Annex | Bineng |
| Benguet National High School - Puguis Annex | Puguis |
| Cordillera Regional Science High School | Wangal |
| Eastern La Trinidad National High School | Beckel |
| La Trinidad National High School | Lubas |

=== Private schools ===
There are 11 private schools according to the Department of Education - Schools Division of Benguet.

- BVS Colleges
- Cordillera Career Development College
- HML International College
- H.O.P.E. Christian Academy, Inc.
- King's College of the Philippines
- Little Flower Children's Home Foundation
- Northskills Polytechnic College, Inc.
- Philippine College of Ministry
- Philippine Nazarene College
- Rainbow Mission International Academy, Inc.
- San Jose School of La Trinidad, Inc.
- Star Colleges

== Notable personalities ==
La Trinidad is the burial place of:

- Deodato Arellano (1844–1899), a Filipino patriot and one of the founders of the Katipunan.

== Sister cities ==
=== Local ===
- Danao, Bohol
- Quezon City

=== International ===
- Hitachiōta, Ibaraki, Japan
- Jincheon County, South Korea
- Laemrung, Thailand
- Minamimaki, Nagano, Japan
- Miyako, Iwate, Japan
- Tamuning, Guam, USA

== See also ==
- La Trinidad Strawberry Farm
