= Ifugao State University =

Public university in Ifugao, Philippines

- Pamantasang Pampamahalaan ng Ifugao (Filipino)
- Former names: List: Nayon Settlement Farm School (1920–1959); Ifugao Pilot Opportunity School of Agriculture (1959–1971); Ifugao Agricultural and Technical College (1971–1982); Ifugao State College of Agriculture and Forestry (1982–2009)
- Type: Public Non-sectarian Coeducational Provincial higher education institution
- Established: 1920; 106 years ago
- Chairperson: Dr. Marita R. Canapi of CHED
- President: Dr. Eva Marie Codamon-Dugyon
- Vice-president: List: Freddie B. Caday, PhD (VP for Administration); Mary P. Caclini, PhD (VP forAcademic Affairs); Nancy Ann P. Gonzales, PhD (VP for Research, Extension and Development); Diosdado M. Aquino, PhD (VP for Planning, Finance and Resource Generation)
- Location: Lamut, Ifugao, Philippines; 16°43′01″N 121°10′23″E
- Campus: Urban Main: Lamut, Ifugao Satellite: Potia, Ifugao; Lagawe, Ifugao; Tinoc, Ifugao; Aguinaldo, Ifugao; Hapao, Hungduan, Ifugao
- Hymn: IFSU Hymn
- Nickname: IFSU
- Website: www.ifsu.edu.ph
- Location in Luzon Location in the Philippines
- Solomon Chungalao, Congressman of the Lone District of Ifugao is the principal author of the bill in the Philippine House of Congress converting the college into a state university.

Ifugao State University (IFSU) is a government owned and funded university in the Philippines. It was originally established in 1920 as 'Nayon Settlement Farm School' by American educators. It gained its university status under Republic Act 9720 passed by the Philippine Congress and the Senate of the Philippines and duly approved in 2009 by Gloria Macapagal Arroyo, then President of the Republic. With the main campus in Lamut, Ifugao, it is mandated to offer course specializations on Agriculture, Forestry, Nursing, Social Sciences, Criminology, Teacher Education, Business Administration, Public Administration, Information Technology, Food Science, among others at undergraduate and graduate levels.

== History ==
IFSU in a capsule

The history of Ifugao State University (IFSU) chronicles the triumphs of the Ifugao people amidst adversities since its early inception. The history further speaks of the extraordinary and unwavering contributions of its early pioneers that led to the unprecedented and progressive metamorphosis of the University. Today, IFSU continues to flourish and contributes in shaping and improving the socio-economic, cultural and political landscape of the province.

The early beginnings

In 1920, IFSU started as Nayon Settlement Farm School (NSFS) by American Educators offering general elementary instruction while engaging in agriculture projects particularly vegetable, poultry, and swine production. It closed at the outbreak of World War II and reopened after liberation maintaining its offerings.

The substantial success made in these agricultural projects must have provided the ideas for Filipino education officials who took over the leadership of the local education system.

Mr. Felix U. Brawner Sr., District Supervisor of Kiangan (where Lamut was part), together with then Principal Raymundo de Leon conceived a type of instruction based on basic agriculture, for the Nayon Elementary School. Even when Mr. Brawner was promoted as the Assistant Superintendent for Baguio – Mt. Province Division and Mr. de Leon took over as District Supervisor, the duo continued to crystallize the plan. Soon, they submitted a proposal for the elevation of the institution to Congressman Luis Hora, Representative of the defunct Third District of Mt. Province which included Ifugao.

The late Congressman Hora was enthusiastic with the proposal, discussed it with colleagues and higher education officials, and filed a bill in congress. It was approved sometime in 1959 as Republic Act (R.A.) 2432 elevating in the school into the Ifugao Pilot Opportunity School of Agriculture (IPOSA).

The IPOSA, with unique offering exclusively on the rudiments of agricultural skill to out of school youths and adults, started in March 1961. Mr. Pedro D. Indunan, then newly appointed Benguet Ifugao Apayao Kalinga Division Supervisor, together with General Education Supervisors from the Division for non-formal education assisted the implementation of the programs.

Tasked to pioneer the leadership of the new type of school was Mr. Saturnino C. Cauton. With him were five school farm demonstrators and five administrative staffs, Mr. Cauton headed the school until the end of 1966. He was succeeded by Albert B. Dimas in January 1967.

In recognition to the ownership of the site of the institution, Congressman Luis Hora filed another Legislative Act renaming the school into Payon Bugan Pilot Opportunity School of Agriculture (PBPOSA) in honor of Bugan, the original owner and donor of the land where the main campus of IFSU now stands. With Administrator Dimas, the school continued to grow especially with the offering of the regular vocational agriculture and homemaking courses.

Hon. Romulo B. Lumauig, the first elected congressman of the new province of Ifugao, saw it fit that the school offers college courses and so he worked for the passage of R.A. 6453. The law that converted PBPOSA into Ifugao Agricultural and Technical College (IATC) which produces the first batch of graduates from two-year technical courses in agriculture and homemaking in 1975 and first batch of graduates from the degree courses in Bachelor of Science in Agriculture (BSA) and Bachelor of Science in Home Technology (BSHT) in 1977.

During the Interim Batasan Pambansa, Assemblyman Gualberto B. Lumauig capped the steady upward metamorphosis of the institution with the Parliamentary Bill No. 1326 which was approved by then President Ferdinand E. Marcos in March 1982 as Batas Pambansa (BP) Blg. 189. It upgraded the IATC into the Ifugao State College of Agriculture and Forestry (ISCAF) integrating with it the former Potia National Agricultural School in Potia; and the Barangay Schools at Amduntog, Kiangan; Hacmal, Aguinaldo; Hapao, Hungduan and Impugong, Tinoc. Thereupon, the autonomous chartered state college started its implementation in January 1983 with Superintendent Albert B. Dimas as Officer-In-Charge (OIC) Administrator.

The Birth of ISCAF

In December 1985, Dr. Toribio B. Adaci was appointed as the Second College President, With Dr. Adaci, the College grew even higher with the offering of several degree and Master's Program.

By virtue of R.A. 7722, otherwise known as the Higher Education Modernization Act of 1994, Higher Education Institutions (HEIs) were separated from the Basic Education (Elementary and High School) and were subjected to the supervision of the Commission on Higher Education (CHED) while the latter with Department of Education (DepEd). R.A. 8292 authorized the integration of CHED Supervised Institutions (CSIs) to existing State Universities and Colleges (SUCs) in the respective provinces. Thus, the Ifugao College of Arts and Trades (ICAT) at Lagawe was integrated to ISCAF in the year 1999 covered under Board Resolution No. 645.

In February 2002, Dr. Adaci retired and the college was placed under interim management pending the search and election of a new president. Dr. Marcelo M. Roguel, President of the Nueva Vizcaya State Institute of Technology (NVSIT),(now NVSU was appointed as the Officer-In-Charge (OIC) President in concurrent capacity. He moved to organize various academic units into Institutes and pushed for the accreditation of academic programs.

The beginning of new era

On February 21, 2003, a new era was ushered in by the unanimous election of the Second College President, Dr. Serafin L. Ngohayon. Dr. Ngohayon recognized the urgent need for a comprehensive development plan and worked for the immediate crafting, approval and implementation of the ISCAF 8- Year Development Plan 2003–2011. The vision to transform ISCAF into a University was born and was vigorously pursued. The College develops in all fronts, i.e. more courses were opened all the way to the doctoral level (Ph.D.), curricular programs were standardized and accredited, systems were computerized, needed facilities improved, researches doubled, extension programs multiplied and income generating projects put up. All of these helped ISCAF from being a SUC level I to SUC Level III status in 2007.

Recognizing the readiness of ISCAF and the clamor for higher education institution in the province with a broader scope of operation and expansive course offerings, Congressman Solomon Chungalao of the Lone District of Ifugao, filed House Bill (HB) No. 926 seeking to convert ISCAF into Ifugao State University (IFSU). The bill was later substituted as HB No. 4409 with other Congressmen as co-sponsors. It was passed in the House of Representatives on September 16, 2008, and immediately transmitted to the Philippine Senate.

Meanwhile, the move to convert ISCAF into a university gained support in the Philippine Senate with counterpart bills filed by Senator Aquilino Pimentel Jr. (SB 1224) and Senator Manny Villar (SB 2658), respectively. Along with HB 4409, deliberations on the senate counterpart measures started on September 17, 2008, highlighted by a public hearing done on April 24, 2009, and its successful passage in the senate floor for Second reading on July 27, 2009. With the full support of the Senators and the Senate Leadership (Senate President Juan Ponce Enrile, Majority Floor leader Juan Miguel Zubiri, Chairman of the Senate Committee on Finance Edgardo Angara) the consolidated HB 4409 under committee report 536 was passed on third and final reading on August 18, 2009. Thereafter, it was sent back to the House of Representatives for concurrence and subsequent signature of Speaker Prospero Nograles. It was returned to the senate for the signature of Senate President Juan Ponce Enrile who formally transmitted it to Malacañang on September 17, 2009.

The legislative task of transforming ISCAF into a University was completed on October 14, 2009 with the signing of Republic Act No. 9720 by President Gloria Macapagal Arroyo into law entitled “An act Converting the Ifugao State College of Agriculture and Forestry And All Its Existing Campuses Located in the Province of Ifugao Into A University To Be Known As The Ifugao State University And Appropriating Funds Thereof”.

Formal operation of the Ifugao State University started on January 6, 2010, with the official launching of the university status marked by the approval and adoption of the IFSU Code and the 5 Year 2010–2014 Development Plan.

By virtue of Section 9 of R.A. 9720, Serafin L. Ngohayon was the First University President. He was officially appointed and sworn into office on December 14, 2009. Under Dr. Ngohayon's exemplary leadership from 2003 to June 1, 2018, he steered a new era of IFSU.

Election of the Second University President

In 2018, another historic event unfolded. The Board of Regents elected the First woman and Second IFSU President, Dr. Eva Marie Codamon-Dugyon. By virtue of BOR Resolution No. 744 series of 2018, Dr. Dugyon was appointed as the new President of IFSU effective June 2, 2018 to June 1, 2022.

During her first months, Dr. Dugyon convened the IFSU officials and stakeholders and crafted the 8-Year Development Plan (2018–2026). The 8-Year Strategic Plan outlined the new vision, mission and goals of the University. Aside from this, a new organizational structure was approved by the BOR.

Currently, IFSU has six campuses, namely: Lamut (Main); Lagawe; Hapao, Hungduan; Potia; Aguinaldo and Tinoc.

== Location ==
The Ifugao State University is the only tertiary educational institution in the province of Ifugao. It is in Northern Luzon, Philippines in the southeastern portion of Ifugao province.

The main campus is at Barangay Nayon, Municipality of Lamut, about 300 kilometers from Manila, the capital city of the Philippines. Potia Campus at Alfonso Lista, Ifugao is about 72 kilometers from Santiago City; Lagawe Campus is nestled at Bahawit, Lagawe, the capital town of Ifugao; and Tinoc Campus lies at the western part of Ifugao, about 14 kilometers from Mt. Pulag.

== Governance ==
The Ifugao State University is governed by an 11-member Board of Regents. It is chaired by Hon. Lilian A. De Las Llagas, Commission on Higher Education Commissioner and Chairperson of IFSU'S Board of Regents. Its members include:

- Hon. Eva Marie Codamon-Dugyon, Vice Chairperson (President of Ifugao State University)
- Hon. Denis B. Habawel, Representative of Sen. Francis Escudero, Chairperson of Senate Committee on Education, Culture and Arts
- Hon. Rosalina L. Bistoyong, Representative of Hon. Paolo Averardo S. Javier, House Committee on Higher & Technical Education (February 1, 2019 – June 30, 2019)
- Hon. Milagros A. Rimando, Regional Executive Director of NEDA-CAR
- Hon. Cameron P. Odsey, Regional Executive Director of DA-CAR
- Hon. Gracelyn L. Tique, President of the Federated Student Association
- Hon. Laurence H. Nanglegan Sr., Private Sector Representative of District I
- Hon. Donato L. Ngabit Jr., President of the Federated Faculty Association
- Private Sector Representative of District II
- President of the Federated Alumni Association

Note: Hon. Doctor Amil Bahni was elected as President of the Federated Alumni Association

== International linkages and partners ==
Gaining international recognition, IFSU sends its students abroad (such as to the United States, Middle East, Europe, Australia and Asia) and, at the same time, accommodates foreign students from these areas via exchange programs. International students enrolled at IFSU are accommodated as well. IFSU is accredited/authorized by the Bureau of Immigration of the Philippines to accept foreign students. International partners/linkages include:

1. Kobe Gakuin University, Japan
2. Kanazawa University, Japan
3. Pacific Ocean University, Vietnam
4. Nanyeng International College, Myanmar
5. National Dong Hwa University, Taiwan
6. US Peace Corps
7. Euro College, North Macedonia
8. Food and Agriculture Organization (FAO)
9. National Chengchi University, Taiwan
10. University of California, Los Angeles
11. University Mobility in Asia and the Pacific

== Accreditation ==
IFSU's programs are accredited by the Accrediting Agency of Chartered Colleges and Universities in the Philippines (AACCUP). The AACCUP is a full member of the:

- National Network of Quality Assurance Agencies, Inc. (NNQAA), authorized by the Commission on Higher Education to certify programs duly accredited by accrediting agencies.
- Asia-Pacific Quality Network (APQN) with AACCUP as member of the Steering Group based in Hong Kong, China. The APQN is a powerful grouping of accrediting agencies across the Asia Pacific. Among the member countries are Australia, New Zealand, China, South Korea, Japan, India, Singapore, Malaysia, Philippines and many other nations. APQN is an international recognized accreditation association, recognized by Council for Higher Education Accreditation (CHEA-USA).
- International Network of Quality Assurance Agencies in Higher Education (INQAAHE) based in The Hague, The Netherlands.

Ifugao State University was accredited by International Distance Education Accreditation League (IDEAL) on March 18, 2011. IDEAL was a full member of APQN (Asia Pacific Quality Network) with Head Office in Shanghai, China.

IFSU is listed in the IAU (International Association of Universities) database. IAU is a unit of UNESCO. IFSU is listed under universities in the Philippines.

== Graduate programs ==
Cross Border Campus, Penang, Malaysia with Dato Dr. Ben Lee as Coordinator.

- Doctor of Business Administration (DBA)
- Doctor of Philosophy (Ph.D.) major in

Management
Public Administration
Educational Management

- Master in Business Administration (MBA)
- Master of Arts in Education
- Master of Arts in Nursing

Main Campus, Nayon, Lamut, Ifugao, Philippines with Dr. Mary P. Caclini, VPAA and Graduate School Coordinator

- Doctor of Business Administration (DBA)
- Doctor of Philosophy (Ph.D.) major in

Public Administration
Educational Administration

- Master in Business Administration (MBA)
- Master in Public Administration (MPA)
- Master of Arts in Education (MAEd)
- Master of Arts in Teaching major in English and Social Sciences
- Master of Arts in Nursing (MAN)
