= Legislative districts of Mountain Province =

Legislative district of the Philippines

The legislative districts of Mountain Province are the representations of Mountain Province in the various national legislatures of the Philippines. The province is currently represented in the lower house of the Congress of the Philippines through its lone congressional district.

The present-day provinces of Apayao, Benguet, Ifugao and Kalinga, as well as the highly urbanized city of Baguio, formed part of the old (pre-division) Mountain Province's representation until 1969. Since 1969, the representation of Mountain Province has been confined only to the limits of the former sub-province of Bontoc.

== History ==
=== As the undivided Mountain Province (1908–1966) ===
Initially being excluded from representation in the lower house of the Philippine Legislature in 1907, the then non-Christian-majority areas of the Philippines — which included the undivided Mountain Province — were finally extended legislative representation with the passage of the Philippine Autonomy Act in 1916 by the United States Congress. The Revised Administrative Code (Act No. 2711) enacted on March 10, 1917, further elaborated on the manner by which these areas would be represented. The non-Christian areas were to be collectively represented in the upper house's 12th senatorial district by two senators, both appointed by the Governor-General. Three assembly members, also appointed by the Governor-General, were to represent the Mountain Province and the chartered city of Baguio in the lower house as a single at-large district. The appointment of these members of the Legislature did not require the consent of the upper house; the appointive legislators were also not necessarily required to be residents of the areas they represented. For example, Assemblyman Pedro Aunario, a resident of Manila, and Senator Lope K. Santos, a resident of Rizal, were among the representatives of the Mountain Province.

Despite several of the Mountain Province's municipalities and municipal districts being annexed to the neighboring provinces of Ilocos Sur (in 1920), La Union (in 1920) and Cagayan (in 1922 and 1928), voters in these areas were still represented by the three assembly members of the Mountain Province, and two senators of the twelfth senatorial district. Only starting in 1935 were these voters extended the right to participate in electing representatives of their respective new provinces, when Act No. 4203 assigned them to specific districts for the purposes of electing members of the unicameral National Assembly of the Philippines.

Act No. 4203 also abolished the senatorial district system and made the Mountain Province's representation to the National Assembly elective through popular vote; the law divided the province into three districts with definite territorial composition. The only sub-province which belonged to more than one district was Bontoc: the eastern portion consisting of the present-day municipalities of Barlig, Bontoc, Paracelis, Natonin, Sabangan, Sadanga and Sagada were represented as part of the undivided province's first district, while the western portion which formerly belonged to the now-defunct Lepanto sub-province (Bauko, Besao and Tadian) were represented as part of the third district.

During the Second World War, the Mountain Province sent two delegates to the National Assembly of the Japanese-sponsored Second Philippine Republic: one was the provincial governor (an ex officio member), while the other was elected through a provincial assembly of KALIBAPI members during the Japanese occupation of the Philippines. Baguio, being a chartered city, was represented separately in this short-lived legislative body. Upon the restoration of the Philippine Commonwealth in 1945, district representation was restored to the pre-war setup: the sub-province of Bontoc remained split between the first and third districts, and the independent city of Baguio remained part of the second district.

=== As the reduced Mountain Province (1966–present) ===
The enactment of Republic Act No. 4695 on June 18, 1966, made the sub-province of Bontoc into a full-fledged province that retained the name "Mountain Province." Per Section 10 of R.A. 4695 the three incumbent representatives of pre-division Mountain Province continued to serve their respective districts until the end of the 6th Congress.

The new (post-division) Mountain Province began electing its lone representative in 1969. The province was represented as part of Region I from 1978 to 1984, and returned one representative, elected at-large, to the Regular Batasang Pambansa in 1984.

Under the new Constitution which was proclaimed on February 11, 1987, Mountain Province constituted a lone congressional district, and elected its member to the restored House of Representatives starting that same year.

== Lone District ==
- Population (2015): 154,590

Period	Representative
7th Congress; 1969–1972	Alfredo G. Lamen
8th Congress; 1987–1992	Victor S. Dominguez
9th Congress; 1992–1995	Victor S. Dominguez
10th Congress; 1995–1998	Victor S. Dominguez
11th Congress; 1998–2001	Josephine D. Dominguez
12th Congress; 2001–2004	Roy S. Pilando
13th Congress; 2004–2007	Victor S. Dominguez (Note: Died on February 8, 2008; seat remained vacant until the end of the 14th Congress.)
14th Congress; 2007–2010	Victor S. Dominguez
14th Congress; 2007–2010	vacant (Note: Kalinga Representative Manuel Agyao was the designated Legislative Caretaker of the district.)
15th Congress; 2010–2013	Maximo B. Dalog (Note: Died on June 3, 2017; seat remained vacant until the end of the 17th Congress.)
16th Congress; 2013–2016	Maximo B. Dalog
17th Congress; 2016–2019	Maximo B. Dalog
17th Congress; 2016–2019	vacant (Note: Kalinga Representative Allen Jesse Mangaoang was designated as Legislative Caretaker of the district on July 5, 2017.)
18th Congress; 2019–2022	Maximo Y. Dalog Jr.
19th Congress; 2022–2025	Maximo Y. Dalog Jr.

== 1st District (defunct) ==
- Sub-province of Apayao: Calanasan (Bayag), Conner, Kabugao, Luna, Namaltugan (annexed to Calanasan 1936), Tauit (annexed to Luna 1936), Pudtol (established 1959), Flora (established 1963), Santa Marcela (established 1967)
- part of Sub-province of Bontoc: Barlig, Bontoc, Natonin, Sabangan, Sadanga, Sagada, Paracales (Paracelis) (established 1962)
- Sub-province of Kalinga: Balbalan, Lubuagan, Pinukpuk, Tabuk, Tanudan, Tinglayan (transferred from Bontoc sub-province 1922), Liwan (established 1965), Pasil (established 1966)

Period	Representative
1st National Assembly; 1935–1938	Saturnino Moldero
2nd National Assembly; 1938–1941	Saturnino Moldero
1st Commonwealth Congress; 1945	George K. Tait
1st Congress; 1946–1949	George K. Tait
2nd Congress; 1949–1953	Antonio Canao
3rd Congress; 1953–1957	Juan Bondad
4th Congress; 1957–1961	Juan M. Duyan
5th Congress; 1961–1965	Alfredo G. Lamen (Note: Unseated in January 1964 after losing electoral protest to Juan M. Duyan.)
5th Congress; 1961–1965	Juan M. Duyan (Note: Replaced Alfredo G. Lamen after winning electoral protest; took oath of office on January 27, 1964 and served for the remainder of the 5th Congress. Was elected in 1965 to the 6th Congress, but halfway through his term vacated his seat after being elected governor of Kalinga-Apayao on November 14, 1967; seat remained vacant until the end of the 6th Congress.)
6th Congress; 1965–1969	Juan M. Duyan
6th Congress; 1965–1969	vacant

== 2nd District (defunct) ==
- City: Baguio (Note: Independent from the province and does not vote for provincial officials since 1909 by virtue of Act No. 1964. Only voted as part of Mountain Province for congressional representation.)
- Sub-province of Benguet: Ampusungan (annexed to Bakun 1936), Atok, Bakun, Bokod, Buguias, Itogon, Kabayan, Kapangan, Kibungan, La Trinidad, Mankayan, Sablan, Tuba, Tublay

Period	Representative
1st National Assembly; 1935–1938	Felipe E. Jose
2nd National Assembly; 1938–1941	Ramon P. Mitra
1st Commonwealth Congress; 1945	Ramon P. Mitra
1st Congress; 1946–1949	Jose Mencio
2nd Congress; 1949–1953	Dennis Molintas (Note: Unseated after losing electoral protest to Ramon P. Mitra.)
2nd Congress; 1949–1953	Ramon P. Mitra (Note: Replaced Dennis Molintas after winning electoral protest on October 12, 1951; took oath of office on January 28, 1952 and served for the remainder of the 2nd Congress.)
3rd Congress; 1953–1957	Ramon P. Mitra
4th Congress; 1957–1961	Ramon P. Mitra
5th Congress; 1961–1965	Ramon P. Mitra
6th Congress; 1965–1969	Andres Cosalan

== 3rd District (defunct) ==
- Sub-province of Ifugao: Banaue, Lagawe (Burnay), Hungduan, Kiangan, Mayoyao, Potia (established as municipal district 1955), Lamut (established as municipal district 1959)
- part of Sub-province of Bontoc (annexed from Lepanto 1920): Banaao (annexed to Kayan 1935), Bauko, Besao, Tadian (Kayan)

Period	Representative
1st National Assembly; 1935–1938	George K. Tait
2nd National Assembly; 1938–1941	Miguel Gumangan
1st Commonwealth Congress; 1945	Gregorio Marrero (Note: Took oath of office on June 11, 1945.)
1st Congress; 1946–1949	Gabriel Dunuan
2nd Congress; 1949–1953	Gabriel Dunuan
3rd Congress; 1953–1957	Luis Hora
4th Congress; 1957–1961	Luis Hora
5th Congress; 1961–1965	Luis Hora
6th Congress; 1965–1969	Luis Hora

== At-Large (defunct) ==
=== 1917–1935 ===
- includes the independent city of Baguio, (Note: Independent from the province and does not vote for provincial officials since 1909 by virtue of Act No. 1964. Only voted as part of Mountain Province for congressional representation.) and the sub-provinces of Amburayan (abolished 1920), Apayao, Benguet, Bontoc, Ifugao, Kalinga and Lepanto (abolished 1920)
- also includes municipalities and municipal districts that had been transferred to other provinces:
  - Cagayan: Allacapan (1928), Langangan (1922)
  - Ilocos Sur: Alilem (1920), Angaki (1920), Cervantes (1920), Concepcion (1920), San Emilio (1920), Sigay (1920), Sugpon (1920), Suyo (1920), Tagudin (1920)
  - La Union: Bagulin (1920), Disdis (1920), Pugo (1920), Santol (1920), San Gabriel (1920), Sudipen (1920)

Period	Representatives		
4th Philippine Legislature; 1916–1919 (Note: Representatives only assumed office in 1917 after appointment by the Governor-General, pursuant to the provisions of Act No. 2711.)	Rafael Bulayungan	Juan Cariño	Valentin Manglapus
5th Philippine Legislature; 1919–1922	Rafael Bulayungan	Juan Cariño	Pedro Aunario
6th Philippine Legislature; 1922–1925	Joaquin Codamon	Miguel Cornejo (Note: Removed from office by Governor-General on October 6, 1925 after being convicted and sentenced to imprisonment for assaulting an American.)	Henry A. Kamora
6th Philippine Legislature; 1922–1925	Joaquin Codamon	Juan Cailles (Note: Appointed by the Governor-General in October 1925 to fill the vacated seat of Miguel Cornejo.)	Henry A. Kamora
7th Philippine Legislature; 1925–1928	Joaquin Codamon	Juan Cailles	Saturnino Moldero
8th Philippine Legislature; 1928–1931	Clement F. Irving	Juan Cailles	Saturnino Moldero
9th Philippine Legislature; 1931–1934	Hilary P. Clapp	Juan Gaerlan	Henry A. Kamora
10th Philippine Legislature; 1934–1935	Emiliano P. Aguirre	Felix F. Diaz	Rodolfo Hidalgo

=== 1943–1944 ===
- includes the sub-provinces of Apayao, Benguet, Bontoc, Ifugao and Kalinga; excludes the independent city of Baguio

Period	Representatives
National Assembly; 1943–1944	Florencio Bagwan
National Assembly; 1943–1944	Hilary P. Clapp (ex officio)

=== 1984–1986 ===
Period	Representative
Regular Batasang Pambansa; 1984–1986	Victor S. Dominguez

== See also ==
- Legislative district of Benguet
  - Legislative district of Baguio
- Legislative district of Ifugao
- Legislative district of Kalinga-Apayao
  - Legislative district of Apayao
  - Legislative district of Kalinga
