= Mayoyao =

- Municipality
- Municipality of Mayoyao
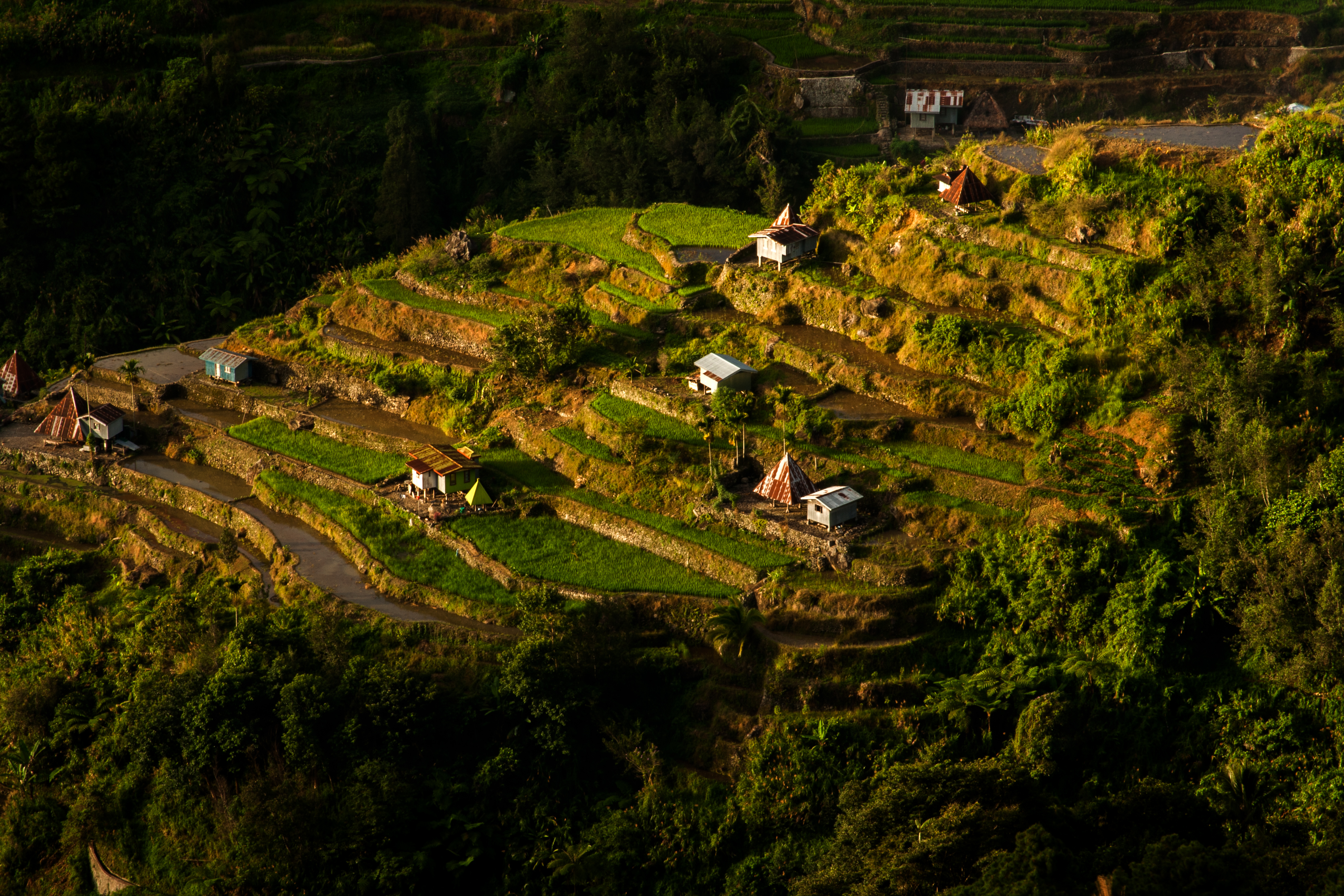
- Mayoyao Rice Terraces

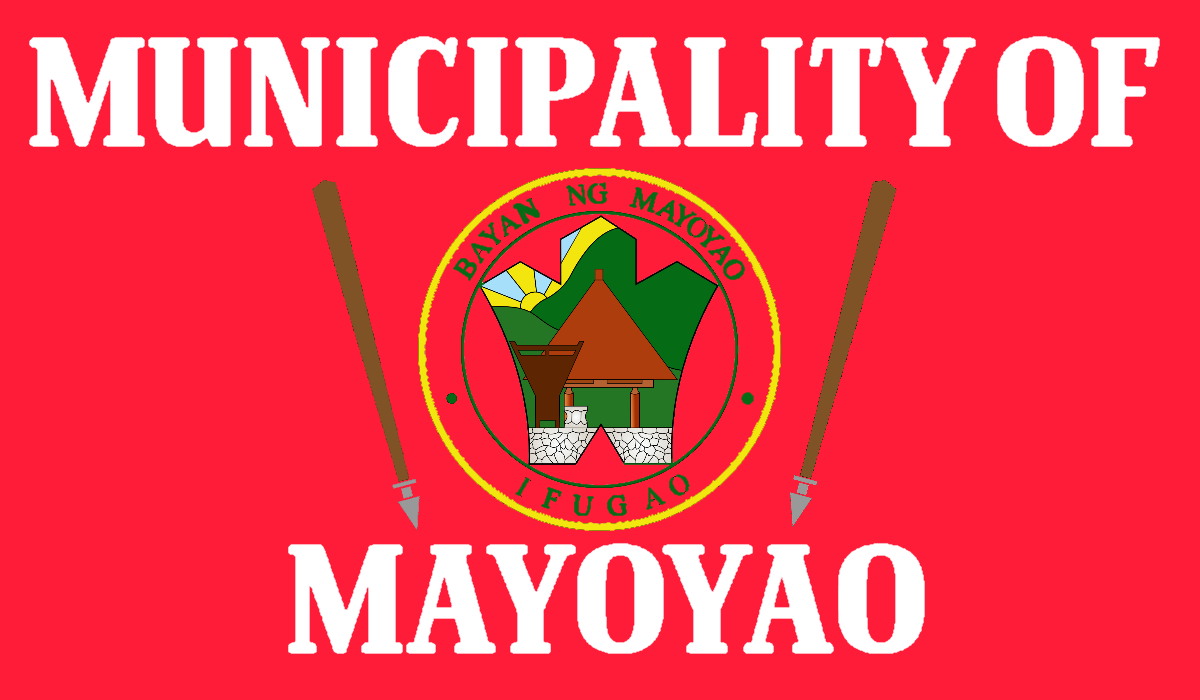
- Flag Seal

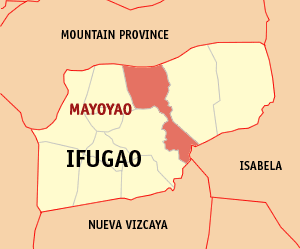
- Map of Ifugao with Mayoyao highlighted
- Interactive map of Mayoyao
- Location within the Philippines
- Coordinates: 16°58′25″N 121°13′17″E
- Country: Philippines
- Region: Cordillera Administrative Region
- Province: Ifugao
- District: Lone district
- Barangays: 27 (see Barangays)

Government
  - Type: Sangguniang Bayan
  - Mayor: Jimmy B. Padchanan Jr.
  - Vice Mayor: Rudy N. Chilagan Jr.
  - Representative: Solomon Chungalao
  - Municipal Council: Members: Clarence O. Licnachan; Mengfee T. Hamchawan; Marie Cris P. Nachegpan; Myra Faith N. Lumayna; Camilo P. Paligan Jr.; Jupiter B. Hedchugan; Peter P. Pinalgan; Leandro L. Elahe
  - Electorate: 8,159 voters (2025)

Area
  - Total: 238.05 km^{2} (91.91 sq mi)
- Elevation: 1,186 m (3,891 ft)
- Highest elevation: 2,122 m (6,962 ft)
- Lowest elevation: 455 m (1,493 ft)

Population (2024 census)
  - Total: 15,525
  - Density: 65.217/km^{2} (168.91/sq mi)
  - Households: 3,942

Economy
  - Income class: 3rd municipal income class
  - Poverty incidence: 8.55% (2023)
  - Revenue: ₱ 184.2 million (2024)
  - Assets: ₱ 527.2 million (2024)
  - Expenditure: ₱ 143.6 million (2024)
  - Liabilities: ₱ 69.73 million (2024)

Service provider
  - Electricity: Ifugao Electric Cooperative (IFELCO)
- Time zone: UTC+8 (PST)
- ZIP code: 3602
- PSGC: 1402706000
- IDD : area code: +63 (0)74
- Native languages: Ifugao; Tuwali; Ilocano; Tagalog

Mayoyao, officially the Municipality of Mayoyao is a municipality in the province of Ifugao, Philippines. According to the 2024 census, it has a population of 15,525 people.

== History ==
=== Battle of Mayoyao Ridge ===
From July 26 to August 9, 1945, Filipino soldiers under the command of Donald Blackburn, supported by airstrikes by Army Air Forces, captured the town, then a Japanese stronghold. The result was key to the eventual surrender of General Tomoyuki Yamashita at Kiangan, Ifugao.

A memorial marker, located at Mount Nagchajan, marks the site of the battle.

== Geography ==
Mayoyao is situated 62.99 kilometres (39.14 mi) from the provincial capital Lagawe, and 413.66 kilometres (257.04 mi) from the country's capital city of Manila.

=== Barangays ===
Mayoyao is politically subdivided into 27 barangays. Each barangay consists of puroks and some have sitios.

- Aduyongan
- Alimit
- Ayangan
- Balangbang
- Banao
- Banhal
- Bato-Alatbang
- Bongan
- Buninan
- Chaya
- Chumang
- Epeng
- Guinihon
- Inwaloy
- Langayan
- Liwo
- Maga
- Magulon
- Mapawoy
- Mayoyao Proper
- Mongol
- Nalbu
- Nattum
- Palaad
- Poblacion
- Talboc
- Tulaed

=== Climate ===
Climate data for Mayoyao, Ifugao
Month	Jan	Feb	Mar	Apr	May	Jun	Jul	Aug	Sep	Oct	Nov	Dec	Year
Mean daily maximum °C (°F)	19 (66)	21 (70)	23 (73)	26 (79)	26 (79)	26 (79)	25 (77)	24 (75)	24 (75)	23 (73)	22 (72)	20 (68)	23 (74)
Mean daily minimum °C (°F)	14 (57)	15 (59)	15 (59)	17 (63)	18 (64)	18 (64)	18 (64)	18 (64)	18 (64)	17 (63)	17 (63)	15 (59)	17 (62)
Average precipitation mm (inches)	103 (4.1)	73 (2.9)	49 (1.9)	38 (1.5)	141 (5.6)	144 (5.7)	172 (6.8)	181 (7.1)	155 (6.1)	148 (5.8)	147 (5.8)	208 (8.2)	1,559 (61.5)
Average rainy days	17.1	12.8	11.0	9.6	18.9	21.5	22.5	24.5	21.7	16.1	17.1	20.5	213.3
Source: Meteoblue

== Demographics ==
Population census of Mayoyao
Year	Pop.	±% p.a.
1918	10,226	—
1939	9,184	−0.51%
1948	8,093	−1.40%
1960	15,028	+5.29%
1970	20,189	+2.99%
1975	24,422	+3.89%
1980	24,022	−0.33%
1990	23,942	−0.03%
1995	14,733	−8.70%
2000	14,191	−0.80%
2007	16,722	+2.29%
2010	16,413	−0.68%
2015	17,331	+1.04%
2020	15,621	−2.16%
2024	15,525	−0.15%
Source: Philippine Statistics Authority

In the 2024 census, the population of Mayoyao was 15,525 people, with a density of 65 inhabitants per square kilometre or 170 inhabitants per square mile.

== Economy ==
Poverty incidence of Mayoyao (%)

Source: Philippine Statistics Authority

Mayoyao's economy centers on agriculture and tourism. Farmers produce rice varieties, legumes, ginger, and tomatoes. The Mayoyao Rice Terraces have been recognized by UNESCO as a World Heritage Site.

== Government ==
=== Local government ===
Mayoyao, belonging to the lone congressional district of the province of Ifugao, is governed by a mayor designated as its local chief executive and by a municipal council as its legislative body in accordance with the Local Government Code. The mayor, vice mayor, and the councilors are elected directly by the people through an election which is being held every three years.

=== Elected officials ===
Members of the Municipal Council (2025–2028)
Position	Name
Congressman	Solomon R. Chungalao
Mayor	Jimmy B. Padchanan Jr.
Vice-Mayor	Rudy N. Chilagan Jr.
Councilors	Marie Cris P. Nachegpan
Councilors	Jupiter P. Hedchugan
Councilors	Mengfee T. Hamchawan
Councilors	Camilo P. Paligan Jr.
Councilors	Clarence O. Licnachan
Councilors	Myra Faith N. Lumayna
Councilors	Peter P. Pinalgan
Councilors	Leandro L. Elahe

== Education ==
The Mayoyao Schools District Office governs all educational institutions within the municipality. It oversees the management and operations of all private and public, from primary to secondary schools.

=== Primary and elementary schools ===
- Adoyungan Primary School
- Alimit Elementary School
- Ayangan Elementary School
- Balangbang Elementary School
- Banao Elementary School
- Bongan Primary School
- Buninan Primary School
- Chaya Primary School
- Chumang Elementary School
- Epeng Elementary School
- Guinihon Elementary School
- Inwaloy Elementary School
- Langayan Primary School
- Liwo Primary School
- Loyoh ES (Gulon)
- Maga Primary School
- Magulon Elementary School
- Mapawoy Primary School
- Mayban Primary School
- Mayoyao Central School
- Nattum Primary School (Abagong)
- Nattum Primary School (Proper)
- Palaad Elementary School
- Patyay Elementary School
- Talboc Elementary School
- Tulaed Elementary School

=== Secondary schools ===
- Assumption Academy
- Mayoyao National High School
- Tulaed National High School
