= Ifugao's at-large congressional district =

At-large Philippine legislative district for Ifugao

- Constituency for the House of Representatives of the Philippines
- Location of Ifugao within the Philippines
- Province: Ifugao
- Region: Cordillera Administrative Region
- Population: 208,668 (2024)
- Electorate: 136,318 (2025)
- Area: 2,628.21 km^{2} (1,014.76 sq mi)

Current constituency
- Created: 1966
- Representative: Solomon Chungalao
- Created from: Mountain Province's 3rd congressional district
- Political party: NPC
- Congressional bloc: Majority

Ifugao's at-large congressional district is the sole congressional district of the Philippines for the province of Ifugao. The district was created ahead of the 1969 House elections after the former Mountain Province was divided into the provinces of Benguet, Mountain Province, Ifugao, and Kalinga-Apayao in 1966. It has been represented in the House of Representatives since the 7th Congress from 1969 to 1972, in the Regular Batasang Pambansa, the unicameral parliament that replaced the House of Representatives from 1984 to 1986, and in the restored House from the 8th Congress onwards.

The district served as an electoral district in the 1971 Constitutional Convention, with two delegates representing Ifugao at-large.

It is currently represented in the 20th Congress by Solomon Chungalao of the Nationalist People's Coalition.

== History ==
The district was first represented in the restored House by Gualberto Lumauig, the first governor of Ifugao, who was elected in 1987 to the 8th Congress. He was defeated in 1992 by incumbent governor Benjamin Cappleman, who served three consecutive terms until 2001. Cappleman was succeeded by Solomon Chungalao, who also served for three consecutive terms until 2010.

In 2010, Governor Teddy Baguilat was elected to the district's seat as a member of the Liberal Party. He was later nominated in the 2016 election for speaker but was defeated by Pantaleon Alvarez of PDP–Laban.

Chungalao was re-elected in 2019 and subsequently won successive terms in 2022 and 2025. He currently represents the district in the 20th Congress.

== List of members representing the district ==
=== House of Representatives (1945–1973) ===
Portrait	Member	Term of office		Legislature	Party	Electoral history	Constituent LGUs
Portrait	Member	Start	End	Legislature	Party	Electoral history	Constituent LGUs
District created June 18, 1966, from Mountain Province's 2nd district.
	Romulo Lumauig	December 30, 1969	January 17, 1973	7th Congress	Nacionalista	Re-elected in 1969. Term cut short upon the ratification of a new Constitution.	1969–1973; Banaue, Hungduan, Kiangan, Lagawe, Lamut, Mayoyao, Potia
District dissolved into the twelve-seat Region I's at-large district for the Interim Batasang Pambansa.

=== 1971 Constitutional Convention (1971–1972) ===
Seat A						Seat B						Legislature	Constituent LGUs
Portrait	Member	Term of office		Party	Electoral history	Portrait	Member	Term of office		Party	Electoral history	Legislature	Constituent LGUs
Portrait	Member	Start	End	Party	Electoral history	Portrait	Member	Start	End	Party	Electoral history	Legislature	Constituent LGUs
	Raymundo Baguilat	June 1, 1971	November 29, 1972	Nonpartisan	Elected in 1970.		Gaspar Ponchinlan	June 1, 1971	November 29, 1972	Nonpartisan	Elected in 1970.	1971 Constitutional Convention	1971–1972; Barlig, Bauko, Besao, Bontoc, Natonin, Paracelis, Sabangan, Sadanga, Sagada, Tadian

=== Batasang Pambansa (1978–1986) ===
Portrait	Member	Term of office		Legislature	Party	Electoral history	Constituent LGUs
Portrait	Member	Start	End	Legislature	Party	Electoral history	Constituent LGUs
District re-created February 1, 1984.
	Zosimo Paredes	June 30, 1984	March 25, 1986	Regular Batasang Pambansa	Independent KBL	Elected in 1984.	1984–1986; Aguinaldo, Banaue, Hingyon, Hungduan, Kiangan, Lagawe, Lamut, Mayoyao, Potia, Tinoc

=== House of Representatives (1987–present) ===
Portrait	Member	Term of office		Legislature	Party	Electoral history	Constituent LGUs
Portrait	Member	Start	End	Legislature	Party	Electoral history	Constituent LGUs
District re-created February 2, 1987.
	Gualberto Lumauig	June 30, 1987	June 30, 1992	8th Congress	Independent	Elected in 1987.	1987–1992; Aguinaldo, Banaue, Hingyon, Hungduan, Kiangan, Lagawe, Lamut, Mayoyao, Potia (later Alfonso Lista), Tinoc
	Gualberto Lumauig	June 30, 1987	June 30, 1992	8th Congress	Lakas	Elected in 1987.	1987–1992; Aguinaldo, Banaue, Hingyon, Hungduan, Kiangan, Lagawe, Lamut, Mayoyao, Potia (later Alfonso Lista), Tinoc
	Benjamin Cappleman	June 30, 1992	June 30, 2001	9th Congress	LDP	Elected in 1992.	1992–present Aguinaldo, Alfonso Lista, Asipulo, Banaue, Hingyon, Hungduan, Kiangan, Lagawe, Lamut, Mayoyao, Tinoc
	Benjamin Cappleman	June 30, 1992	June 30, 2001	10th Congress	NPC	Re-elected in 1995.	1992–present Aguinaldo, Alfonso Lista, Asipulo, Banaue, Hingyon, Hungduan, Kiangan, Lagawe, Lamut, Mayoyao, Tinoc
	Benjamin Cappleman	June 30, 1992	June 30, 2001	11th Congress	LAMMP	Re-elected in 1998.	1992–present Aguinaldo, Alfonso Lista, Asipulo, Banaue, Hingyon, Hungduan, Kiangan, Lagawe, Lamut, Mayoyao, Tinoc
	Solomon Chungalao	June 30, 2001	June 30, 2010	12th Congress	Liberal	Elected in 2001.	1992–present Aguinaldo, Alfonso Lista, Asipulo, Banaue, Hingyon, Hungduan, Kiangan, Lagawe, Lamut, Mayoyao, Tinoc
	Solomon Chungalao	June 30, 2001	June 30, 2010	13th Congress	Liberal	Re-elected in 2004.	1992–present Aguinaldo, Alfonso Lista, Asipulo, Banaue, Hingyon, Hungduan, Kiangan, Lagawe, Lamut, Mayoyao, Tinoc
	Solomon Chungalao	June 30, 2001	June 30, 2010	14th Congress	Lakas	Re-elected in 2007.	1992–present Aguinaldo, Alfonso Lista, Asipulo, Banaue, Hingyon, Hungduan, Kiangan, Lagawe, Lamut, Mayoyao, Tinoc
	Teddy Baguilat	June 30, 2010	June 30, 2019	15th Congress	Liberal	Elected in 2010.	1992–present Aguinaldo, Alfonso Lista, Asipulo, Banaue, Hingyon, Hungduan, Kiangan, Lagawe, Lamut, Mayoyao, Tinoc
	Teddy Baguilat	June 30, 2010	June 30, 2019	16th Congress	Liberal	Re-elected in 2013.	1992–present Aguinaldo, Alfonso Lista, Asipulo, Banaue, Hingyon, Hungduan, Kiangan, Lagawe, Lamut, Mayoyao, Tinoc
	Teddy Baguilat	June 30, 2010	June 30, 2019	17th Congress	Liberal	Re-elected in 2016.	1992–present Aguinaldo, Alfonso Lista, Asipulo, Banaue, Hingyon, Hungduan, Kiangan, Lagawe, Lamut, Mayoyao, Tinoc
	Solomon Chungalao	June 30, 2019	Incumbent	18th Congress	NPC	Elected in 2019.	1992–present Aguinaldo, Alfonso Lista, Asipulo, Banaue, Hingyon, Hungduan, Kiangan, Lagawe, Lamut, Mayoyao, Tinoc
	Solomon Chungalao	June 30, 2019	Incumbent	19th Congress	NPC	Re-elected in 2022.	1992–present Aguinaldo, Alfonso Lista, Asipulo, Banaue, Hingyon, Hungduan, Kiangan, Lagawe, Lamut, Mayoyao, Tinoc
	Solomon Chungalao	June 30, 2019	Incumbent	20th Congress	NPC	Re-elected in 2025.	1992–present Aguinaldo, Alfonso Lista, Asipulo, Banaue, Hingyon, Hungduan, Kiangan, Lagawe, Lamut, Mayoyao, Tinoc

== Election results ==
=== 1984 ===
1984 Philippine parliamentary election in Ifugao
Party	Candidate	Votes	%
KBL	Zosimo Paredes	17,480	52.07
KBL	Gualberto Lumauig	15,492	46.14
Nacionalista	Teodoro Baguilat Sr.	565	1.68
Independent	Benjamin Nadugo	36	0.11

=== 1992 ===
1992 Philippine House of Representatives elections in Ifugao
Party	Candidate	Votes	%
LDP	Benjamin Cappleman	18,065	41.89
Lakas	Gualberto Lumauig (incumbent)	13,229	30.68
LP–PDP	Denis Habawel	11,832	27.44
Total votes		93,947	100.00
LDP gain from Lakas			

=== 1995 ===
1995 Philippine House of Representatives elections in Ifugao
Party	Candidate	Votes	%
NPC	Benjamin Cappleman (incumbent)	34,900	66.45
Lakas	Gualberto Lumauig	17,619	33.55
Total votes		52,519	100.00
NPC hold			

=== 1998 ===
1998 Philippine House of Representatives elections in Ifugao
Party	Candidate	Votes	%
LAMMP	Benjamin Cappleman (incumbent)	33,187	60.81
Lakas	Denis Habawel	21,384	39.19
Total votes		54,571	100.00
LAMMP hold			

=== 2010 ===
2010 Philippine House of Representatives elections in Ifugao
Party	Candidate	Votes	%
Liberal	Teddy Baguilat	77,273	100.00
Nacionalista	Denis Habawel	17,751	22.97
Independent	Jonathan Cuhayon	13,250	17.15
NPC	Justinian Licnachan	10,606	13.73
Lakas–Kampi	Nelson Allaga	6,082	7.87
Independent	Albert Pawingi	4,090	5.29
PMP	Placido Wachayna Jr.	3,180	4.12
Total votes		77,273	100.00
Liberal gain from Lakas–Kampi			

=== 2013 ===
2013 Philippine House of Representatives elections in Ifugao
Party	Candidate	Votes	%
Liberal	Teddy Baguilat (incumbent)	43,751	51.22
Independent	Solomon Chungalao	41,664	48.78
Total votes		85,415	100.00
Liberal hold			

=== 2016 ===
2016 Philippine House of Representatives elections in Ifugao
Party	Candidate	Votes	%
Liberal	Teddy Baguilat (incumbent)	49,640	55.47
Independent	Solomon Chungalao	39,847	44.53
Total votes		89,487	100.00
Liberal hold			

=== 2019 ===
2019 Philippine House of Representatives elections in Ifugao
Party	Candidate	Votes	%
NPC	Solomon Chungalao	27,398	28.53
LDP	Eugene Balitang	25,362	26.41
Independent	Pedro Mayam-o	19,638	20.45
Lakas	Jonathan Cuhayon	18,418	19.18
PDP–Laban	Timmy Mondiguing	5,231	5.45
Total votes		96,047	100.00
NPC gain from Liberal			

=== 2022 ===
2022 Philippine House of Representatives elections in Ifugao
Party	Candidate	Votes	%
NPC	Solomon Chungalao (incumbent)	48,231	43.94
PRP	Mariano Buyagawan Jr.	34,004	30.98
LDP	Eugene Balitang	27,227	24.80
Independent	Nelson Ayoc	310	0.28
Total votes		109,772	100.00
NPC hold			

=== 2025 ===
2025 Philippine House of Representatives elections in Ifugao
Party	Candidate	Votes	%
NPC	Solomon Chungalao (incumbent)	63,771	54.70
PFP	Francis Cuyop	52,314	44.87
Independent	Nelson Ayoc	355	0.30
PDP	Valdo Boyd Ngipol	145	0.12
Total votes		116,585	100.00
NPC hold			

== See also ==
- Legislative districts of Ifugao
