= Alfonso Lista =

Municipality in Ifugao, Philippines

Alfonso Lista Potia
- Municipality
- Municipality of Alfonso Lista
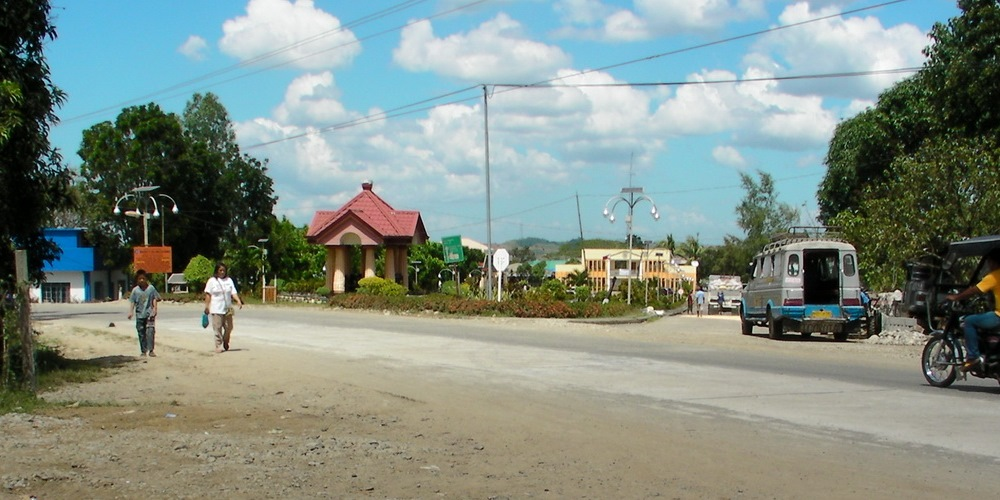
- Street in Alfonso Lista

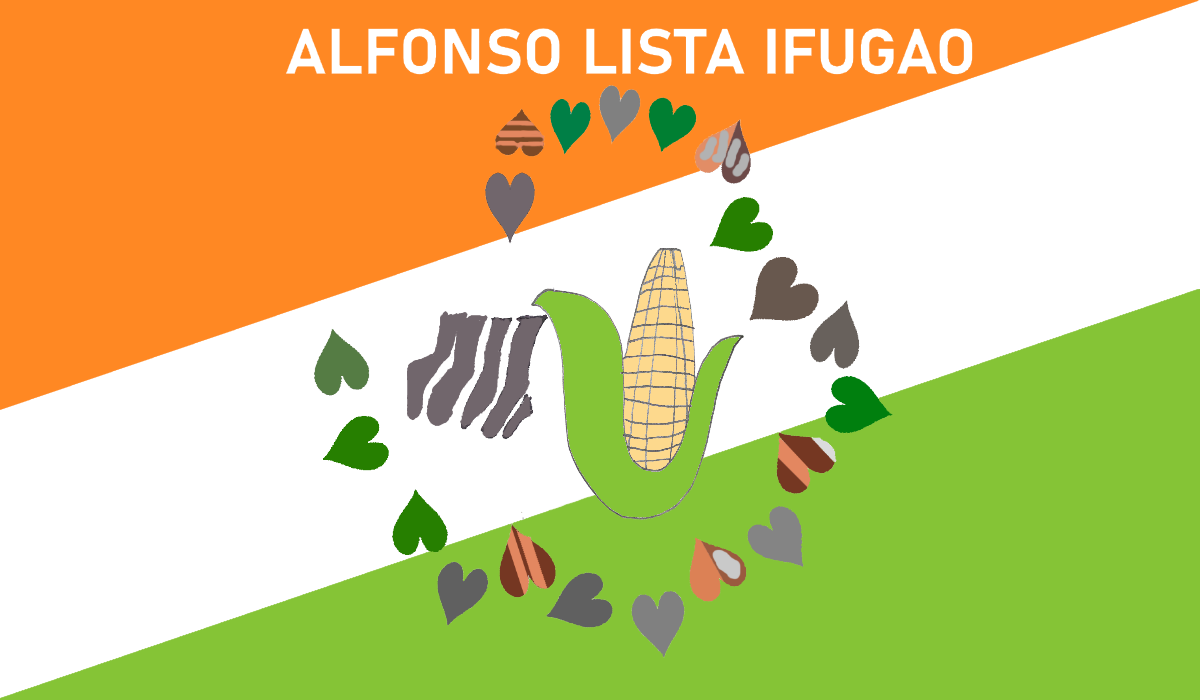
- Flag Seal

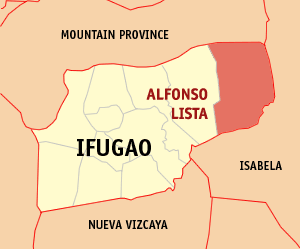
- Map of Ifugao with Alfonso Lista highlighted
- Interactive map of Alfonso Lista
- Location within the Philippines
- Coordinates: 16°55′22″N 121°29′18″E
- Country: Philippines
- Region: Cordillera Administrative Region
- Province: Ifugao
- District: Lone district
- Founded: 11 May 1955
- Barangays: 20 (see Barangays)

Government
  - Type: Sangguniang Bayan
  - Mayor: Edralin B. Alipio
  - Vice Mayor: Agapito B. Dominguez Jr.
  - Representative: Solomon Chungalao
  - Municipal Council: Members: Herman D. Tuguinay; Alvin B. Biwit; Dioney B. Macadangdang; Michael A. Buminaang; Tyrel T. Taganas; Marc Vincent B. Uy; Jesus S. Toribio; Robert D. Almeda
  - Electorate: 21,377 voters (2025)

Area
  - Total: 347.46 km^{2} (134.16 sq mi)
- Elevation: 142 m (466 ft)
- Highest elevation: 1,457 m (4,780 ft)
- Lowest elevation: 431 m (1,414 ft)

Population (2024 census)
  - Total: 34,810
  - Density: 100.2/km^{2} (259.5/sq mi)
  - Households: 8,162

Economy
  - Income class: 1st municipal income class
  - Poverty incidence: 7.7% (2023)
  - Revenue: ₱ 292.7 million (2024)
  - Assets: ₱ 628.9 million (2024)
  - Expenditure: ₱ 280.9 million (2024)
  - Liabilities: ₱ 134.2 million (2024)

Service provider
  - Electricity: Ifugao Electric Cooperative (IFELCO)
- Time zone: UTC+8 (PST)
- ZIP code: 3608
- PSGC: 1402707000
- IDD : area code: +63 (0)74
- Native languages: Ga'dang; Ifugao; Tuwali; Ilocano; Tagalog
- Website: www.alfonsolista.gov.ph

Alfonso Lista, formerly known as Potia, officially the Municipality of Lista is a municipality in the province of Ifugao, Philippines. According to the 2024 census, it has a population of 34,810 people making it the most populous in the province.

== History ==
Potia was created as the municipal district by virtue of Republic Act (RA) No. 1222 on 11 May 1955, from the barrios of Potia, Dolowog, San Juan, San Quintin, Cabicalan, Pinto, Busilac, Santa Maria, and Namillangan in the municipal district of Mayoyao; the seat of government then was designated at Barrio Potia.

Originally called Mun-uupag ("bubbles of foam") by the Ifugao natives, Potia was derived from the term Putiak, a phenomenon wherein plants and flowers in the area opened their pods as they dried and cracked open. The administration of President Sergio Osmeña annexed the area presently composed of Alfonso Lista to present-day San Mateo, Isabela. However, due to opposition by local settlers in the area, a major part of the area was later transferred to Mayoyao of then Ifugao sub-province of the old Mountain Province.

On 25 June 1963, then President Diosdado Macapagal signed Executive No. 42 elevating Potia as a full pledged municipality.

On 18 June 1966, the old Mountain Province was divided into four political entities, one of which is Ifugao, by virtue of Republic Act No. 4763. Barrio Kiling was transferred from the adjacent Paracales (present-day Paracelis, Mountain Province) to Potia, thus finishing efforts to recover the "lost" territories of the municipality.

In 1959, the name of Potia was renamed Lista in honor of its first mayor (1955–1959), Alfonso Lista. It was formalized on 15 December 1988 through Republic Act No. 6687; Barangay Sta. Maria was confirmed as the seat of the municipal government.

However, several government documents including the Philippine Statistics Authority, Commission on Audit, and the municipality itself used the style "Alfonso Lista" as its name.

To avoid confusion with the name used on Republic Act No. 6687, on 24 May 2021, House Bill No. 9451, introduced by Rep. Solomon Chungalao of the Ifugao Lone District, was filed and approved.

On 2 June 2022, Republic Act No. 11813, the act renaming Lista as Alfonso Lista, lapsed into law. A plebiscite, having no final schedule yet, will be supervised by the Commission on Elections.

== Geography ==
Alfonso Lista is situated 110.91 kilometres (68.92 mi) from the provincial capital Lagawe, and 391.99 kilometres (243.57 mi) from the country's capital city of Manila.

=== Barangays ===
Alfonso Lista is politically subdivided into 20 barangays. Each barangay consists of puroks and some have sitios.

- Bangar
- Busilac
- Calimag
- Calupaan
- Caragasan
- Dolowog
- Kiling
- Laya
- Little Tadian
- Namnama
- Namillangan
- Ngileb
- Pinto
- Potia
- San Jose
- San Juan
- San Marcos
- San Quintin
- Santa Maria (Poblacion)
- Santo Domingo (Cabicalan)

=== Climate ===
Climate data for Alfonso Lista, Ifugao
Month	Jan	Feb	Mar	Apr	May	Jun	Jul	Aug	Sep	Oct	Nov	Dec	Year
Mean daily maximum °C (°F)	25 (77)	26 (79)	28 (82)	31 (88)	31 (88)	31 (88)	30 (86)	30 (86)	30 (86)	29 (84)	27 (81)	25 (77)	29 (84)
Mean daily minimum °C (°F)	20 (68)	20 (68)	21 (70)	22 (72)	23 (73)	24 (75)	24 (75)	24 (75)	23 (73)	23 (73)	22 (72)	21 (70)	22 (72)
Average precipitation mm (inches)	103 (4.1)	73 (2.9)	49 (1.9)	38 (1.5)	141 (5.6)	144 (5.7)	172 (6.8)	181 (7.1)	155 (6.1)	148 (5.8)	147 (5.8)	208 (8.2)	1,559 (61.5)
Average rainy days	17.1	12.8	11.0	9.6	18.9	21.5	22.5	24.5	21.7	16.1	17.1	20.5	213.3
Source: Meteoblue

== Demographics ==
Population census of Alfonso Lista
Year	Pop.	±% p.a.
1960	4,343	—
1970	5,796	+2.92%
1975	8,196	+7.20%
1980	11,016	+6.09%
1990	14,816	+3.01%
1995	17,552	+3.23%
2000	21,167	+4.10%
2007	25,323	+2.50%
2010	28,410	+4.27%
2015	32,119	+2.36%
2020	34,061	+1.24%
2024	34,810	+0.52%
Source: Philippine Statistics Authority

In the 2024 census, the population of Alfonso Lista was 34,810 people, with a density of 100 inhabitants per square kilometre or 260 inhabitants per square mile.

The indigenes are largely Ifugao, with smaller numbers of Bontoc and Gaddang originating in the surrounding areas. The majority of the population are Ilocano who began farming the area in the 1930s.

== Economy ==
Poverty incidence of Alfonso Lista (%)

Source: Philippine Statistics Authority

Corn production serves as the primary source of economy for Alfonso Lista's farmers. Alfonso Lista serves as one of the pump irrigation projects that draws water from the Magat Dam reservoir. Alfonso Lista serves as a notable hub for cattle raising in the Cordillera region.

== Government ==
=== Local government ===
Alfonso Lista, belonging to the lone congressional district of the province of Ifugao, is governed by a mayor designated as its local chief executive and by a municipal council as its legislative body in accordance with the Local Government Code. The mayor, vice mayor, and the councilors are elected directly by the people through an election which is being held every three years.

=== Elected officials ===
Members of the Municipal Council (2025–2028)
Position	Name
Congressman	Solomon R. Chungalao
Mayor	Edralin B. Alipio
Vice-Mayor	Agapito B. Dominguez Jr.
Councilors	Alvin B. Biwit
Councilors	Tyrel T. Taganas
Councilors	Jesus S. Toribio
Councilors	Herman D. Tuguinay
Councilors	Michael A. Buminaang
Councilors	Robert D. Almeda
Councilors	Marc Vincent B. Uy
Councilors	Dioney B. Macadangdang

== Education ==
There are two schools district office which govern all educational institutions within the municipality. They oversee the management and operations of all private and public, from primary to secondary schools. These are the Alfonso Lista I Schools District Office, and Alfonso Lista II Schools District Office.

=== Primary and elementary schools ===
- Alfonso Lista Christian Academy
- Alfonso Lista Central School
- Balligi Elementary School
- Bangar Elementary School
- Busilac Elementary School
- Calimag Elementary School
- Calupaan Elementary School
- Caragasan Elementary School
- Catubangan Elementary School
- Dolowog Elementary School
- Kiling Elementary School
- Laya Elementary School
- Little Tadian Elementary School
- Malalupa Elementary School
- Namnama Elementary School
- Namillangan Elementary School
- Ngileb Elementary School
- Pinto Elementary School
- Potia Elementary School
- Mabanutan Elementary School
- Maligaya Elementary School
- San Jose Elementary School
- San Juan Elementary School
- San Marcos Elementary School
- San Quintin Elementary School
- Sto. Domingo Elementary School
- Sto. Domingo Elementary School Annex
- Tallo Purok Elementary School

=== Secondary schools ===
- Caragasan National High School
- Eastern Potia National High School
- Namillangan National High School
- Pinto National High School
- Sta. Maria National High School

== See also ==
- List of renamed cities and municipalities in the Philippines
