= Tinoc =

Municipality in Ifugao, Philippines

- Municipality
- Municipality of Tinoc
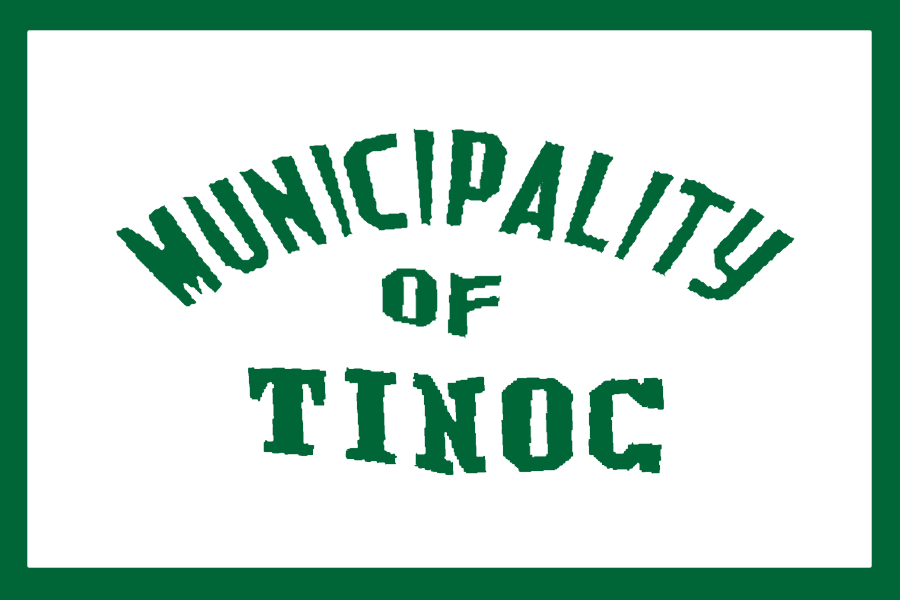
- Flag Seal

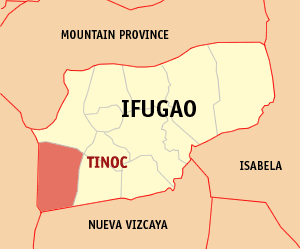
- Map of Ifugao with Tinoc highlighted
- Interactive map of Tinoc
- Location within the Philippines
- Coordinates: 16°40′30″N 120°56′12″E
- Country: Philippines
- Region: Cordillera Administrative Region
- Province: Ifugao
- District: Lone district
- Founded: January 28, 1983
- Barangays: 12 (see Barangays)

Government
  - Type: Sangguniang Bayan
  - Mayor: Samson C. Benito
  - Vice Mayor: Efren A. Tacio
  - Representative: Solomon Chungalao
  - Municipal Council: Members: Randy B. Humakey; Juliet M. Akiangan; Fernando W. Gapuz; Melyn B. Apilis; Marcelo G. Catalino; Rosa W. Binhiwan; Andres T. Jose; Bobsteel N. Donato
  - Electorate: 11,492 voters (2025)

Area
  - Total: 239.70 km^{2} (92.55 sq mi)
- Elevation: 1,644 m (5,394 ft)
- Highest elevation: 2,737 m (8,980 ft)
- Lowest elevation: 944 m (3,097 ft)

Population (2024 census)
  - Total: 18,749
  - Density: 78.219/km^{2} (202.59/sq mi)
  - Households: 4,504

Economy
  - Income class: 3rd municipal income class
  - Poverty incidence: 13.56% (2023)
  - Revenue: ₱ 158 million (2024)
  - Assets: ₱ 645.8 million (2024)
  - Expenditure: ₱ 146 million (2024)
  - Liabilities: ₱ 101 million (2024)

Service provider
  - Electricity: Ifugao Electric Cooperative (IFELCO)
- Time zone: UTC+8 (PST)
- ZIP code: 3609
- PSGC: 1402710000
- IDD : area code: +63 (0)74
- Native languages: Ifugao; Kallahan; Tuwali; Ilocano; Tagalog
- Website: www.tinoc.gov.ph

Tinoc, officially the Municipality of Tinoc is a municipality in the province of Ifugao, Philippines. According to the 2024 census, it has a population of 18,749 people.

== Geography ==
Tinoc is situated 46.10 kilometres (28.65 mi) from the provincial capital Lagawe, and 361.57 kilometres (224.67 mi) from the country's capital city of Manila.

Tinoc currently holds as the highest point in the Philippine Highway System via the Kiangan-Tinoc-Buguias Road in Mt. Gui’ngaw at Barangay Eheb.

=== Barangays ===
Tinoc is politically subdivided into 12 barangays. Each barangay consists of puroks and some have sitios.

- Ahin
- Ap-apid
- Binablayan
- Danggo
- Eheb
- Gumhang
- Impugong
- Luhong
- Tinoc (Poblacion)
- Tukucan
- Tulludan
- Wangwang

=== Climate ===
Climate data for Tinoc, Ifugao
Month	Jan	Feb	Mar	Apr	May	Jun	Jul	Aug	Sep	Oct	Nov	Dec	Year
Mean daily maximum °C (°F)	16 (61)	17 (63)	18 (64)	20 (68)	20 (68)	19 (66)	18 (64)	18 (64)	18 (64)	18 (64)	18 (64)	16 (61)	18 (64)
Mean daily minimum °C (°F)	9 (48)	9 (48)	10 (50)	12 (54)	14 (57)	14 (57)	14 (57)	14 (57)	13 (55)	12 (54)	11 (52)	10 (50)	12 (53)
Average precipitation mm (inches)	38 (1.5)	57 (2.2)	77 (3.0)	141 (5.6)	390 (15.4)	355 (14.0)	426 (16.8)	441 (17.4)	426 (16.8)	259 (10.2)	97 (3.8)	57 (2.2)	2,764 (108.9)
Average rainy days	10.4	12.1	15.4	20.4	26.7	27.1	28.7	28.0	26.4	19.9	14.1	12.3	241.5
Source: Meteoblue

== Demographics ==
Population census of Tinoc
Year	Pop.	±% p.a.
1990	8,256	—
1995	9,504	+2.67%
2000	9,783	+0.62%
2007	12,045	+2.91%
2010	14,147	+6.03%
2015	16,559	+3.04%
2020	18,475	+2.33%
2024	18,749	+0.35%
Source: Philippine Statistics Authority

In the 2024 census, the population of Tinoc was 18,749 people, with a density of 78 inhabitants per square kilometre or 200 inhabitants per square mile.

=== Religion ===
Evangelical and Protestant churches have a strong presence with 48% adherence. There is a significant presence of catholic and animisim.

== Economy ==
Poverty incidence of Tinoc (%)

Source: Philippine Statistics Authority

The economy of Tinoc is primarily agrarian, serving as major vegetable producer of Ifugao. Tinoc relies on vegetables such as cabbage, beans, peas, and carrots. Another source of economy in Tinoc is raising livestock.

== Government ==
=== Local government ===
Tinoc, belonging to the lone congressional district of the province of Ifugao, is governed by a mayor designated as its local chief executive and by a municipal council as its legislative body in accordance with the Local Government Code. The mayor, vice mayor, and the councilors are elected directly by the people through an election which is being held every three years.

=== Elected officials ===
Members of the Municipal Council (2025–2028)
Position	Name
Congressman	Solomon R. Chungalao
Mayor	Samson C. Benito
Vice-Mayor	Efren A. Tacio
Councilors	Randy B. Humakey
Councilors	Juliet M. Akiangan
Councilors	Fernando W. Gapuz
Councilors	Melyn B. Apilis
Councilors	Marcelo G. Catalino
Councilors	Andres T. Jose
Councilors	Bobsteel N. Donato
Councilors	Rosa W. Binwihan

== Education ==
The Tinoc Schools District Office governs all educational institutions within the municipality. It oversees the management and operations of all private and public, from primary to secondary schools.

=== Primary and elementary schools ===
- Ahin Elementary School
- Bagingbing Primary School
- Binablayan Elementary School
- Cocoy Elementary School (Cudiaman)
- Danggo Elementary School
- Dengao Elementary School
- Eheb Elementary School
- Gumhang Elementary School
- Huhlucan Primary School
- Impugong Elementary School
- Luhong Elementary School
- Manaan Elementary School
- Mulam Primary School
- Palabayan Elementary School
- Tinoc Central School
- Tukucan Elementary School
- Tulludan Elementary School
- Wangwang Elementary School

=== Secondary schools ===
- Danggo National High School
- Kalanguya National High School
- Tinoc National High School
