= Legislative districts of Ifugao =

Legislative district of the Philippines

The legislative districts of Ifugao are the representations of the province of Ifugao in the various national legislatures of the Philippines. The province is currently represented in the lower house of the Congress of the Philippines through its lone congressional district.

== History ==
In 1917 the undivided Mountain Province, of which Ifugao was a component sub-province, was provided representation in the Philippine Legislature. Pursuant to the Revised Administrative Code (Act No. 2711) enacted on March 10, 1917, the non-Christian-majority areas of the Philippines, which then included the Mountain Province, were to be collectively represented in the legislature's upper house by two senators from the 12th senatorial district, both appointed by the Governor-General. Three assembly members, also appointed by the Governor-General, were to represent the Mountain Province and the chartered city of Baguio in the lower house as a single at-large district.

The residents of Ifugao and the rest of the Mountain Province only began electing representatives through popular vote in 1935 by virtue of Act No. 4203; the law provided the territorial coverage for each lower house representative district, while also abolishing the senatorial district system. The sub-province was then represented as part of the Mountain Province's third district.

In the disruption caused by the Second World War, the Mountain Province sent two delegates to the National Assembly of the Japanese-sponsored Second Philippine Republic: one was the provincial governor (an ex officio member), while the other was elected through a provincial assembly of KALIBAPI members during the Japanese occupation of the Philippines. Upon the restoration of the Philippine Commonwealth in 1945, district representation was restored to the pre-war setup: the sub-province of Ifugao remained part of Mountain Province's third district.

The enactment of Republic Act No. 4695 on June 18, 1966 made the sub-province of Ifugao into a full-fledged province. The new province began electing its separate representative starting in the next general election.

Ifugao was represented in the Interim Batasang Pambansa as part of Region II from 1978 to 1984, and returned one representative, elected at-large, to the Regular Batasang Pambansa in 1984. It retained its lone congressional district under the new Constitution which was proclaimed on February 11, 1987, and elected its member to the restored House of Representatives starting that same year.

== Lone District ==
- Population (2020): 207,498

Period	Representative
7th Congress; 1969–1972	Romulo B. Lumauig
8th Congress; 1987–1992	Gualberto B. Lumauig
9th Congress; 1992–1995	Benjamin B. Cappleman
10th Congress; 1995–1998	Benjamin B. Cappleman
11th Congress; 1998–2001	Benjamin B. Cappleman
12th Congress; 2001–2004	Solomon Chungalao
13th Congress; 2004–2007	Solomon Chungalao
14th Congress; 2007–2010	Solomon Chungalao
15th Congress; 2010–2013	Teodoro B. Baguilat, Jr.
16th Congress; 2013–2016	Teodoro B. Baguilat, Jr.
17th Congress; 2016–2019	Teodoro B. Baguilat, Jr.
18th Congress; 2019–2022	Solomon Chungalao
19th Congress; 2022–2025	Solomon Chungalao
20th Congress; 2025–present	Solomon Chungalao

== At-Large (defunct) ==
Period	Representative
Regular Batasang Pambansa; 1984–1986	Zosimo Jesus M. Paredes, Jr.
