= Kiangan =

Municipality in Ifugao, Philippines

- Municipality
- Municipality of Kiangan
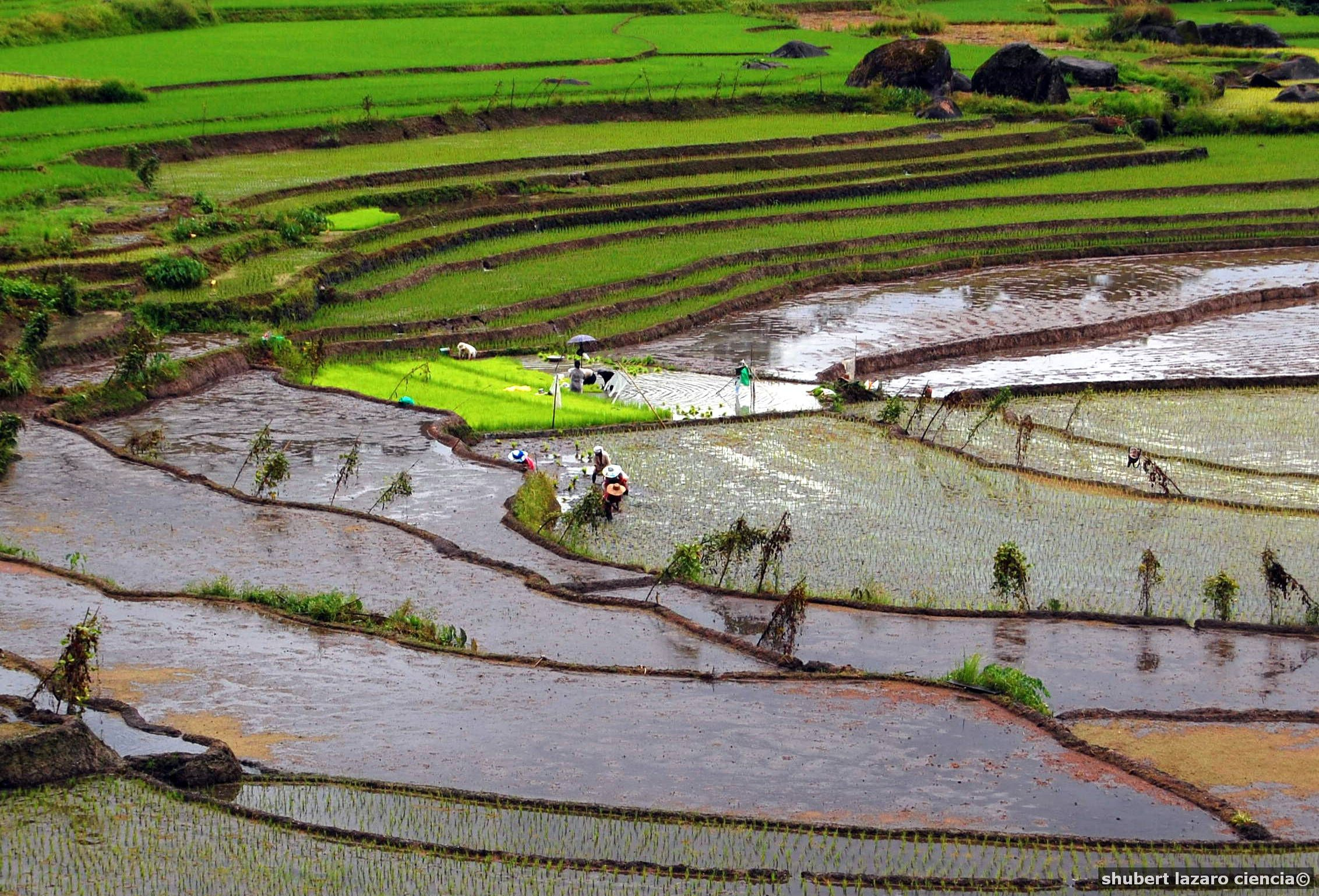
- Nagacadan Rice Terraces

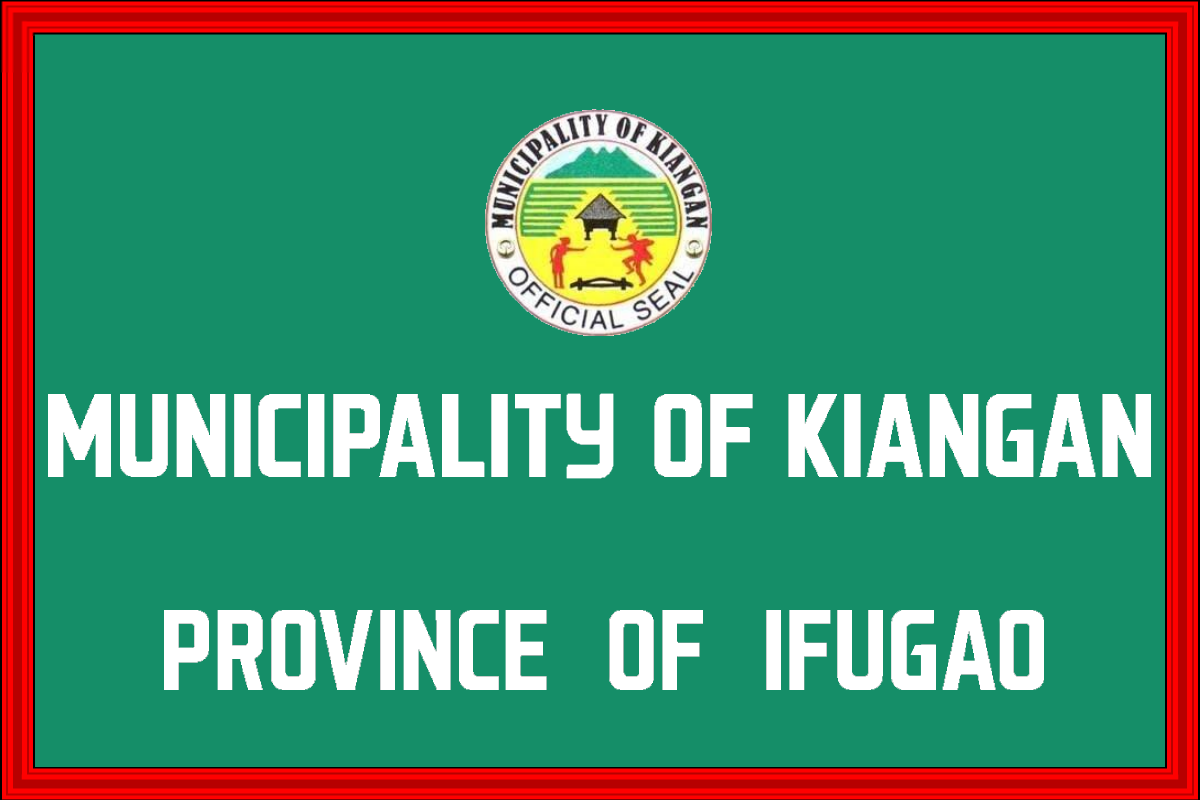
- Flag

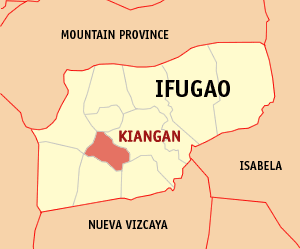
- Map of Ifugao with Kiangan highlighted
- Interactive map of Kiangan
- Location within the Philippines
- Coordinates: 16°46′39″N 121°05′16″E
- Country: Philippines
- Region: Cordillera Administrative Region
- Province: Ifugao
- District: Lone district
- Barangays: 14 (see Barangays)

Government
  - Type: Sangguniang Bayan
  - Mayor: Raldis Andrei A. Bulayungan
  - Vice Mayor: Michelle Alice B. Baguilat
  - Representative: Solomon Chungalao
  - Municipal Council: Members: Clarence B. Buyuccan; Angelito D. Dulinayan; Manuel T. Buhong Sr.; Kimmayong D. Uyan; Lawrence A. Dulnuan Jr.; Roel Francis A. Dulnuan; Raiza D. Gawi; Carol I. Talib
  - Electorate: 12,488 voters (2025)

Area
  - Total: 200.00 km^{2} (77.22 sq mi)
- Elevation: 841 m (2,759 ft)
- Highest elevation: 1,477 m (4,846 ft)
- Lowest elevation: 416 m (1,365 ft)

Population (2024 census)
  - Total: 17,849
  - Density: 89.245/km^{2} (231.14/sq mi)
  - Households: 3,965

Economy
  - Income class: 3rd municipal income class
  - Poverty incidence: 9.15% (2023)
  - Revenue: ₱ 149.2 million (2024)
  - Assets: ₱ 360.6 million (2024)
  - Expenditure: ₱ 151.6 million (2024)
  - Liabilities: ₱ 90.94 million (2024)

Service provider
  - Electricity: Ifugao Electric Cooperative (IFELCO)
- Time zone: UTC+8 (PST)
- ZIP code: 3604
- PSGC: 1402703000
- IDD : area code: +63 (0)74
- Native languages: Ifugao; Kallahan; Tuwali; Ilocano; Tagalog
- Website: kiangan.gov.ph

Kiangan, officially the Municipality of Kiangan is a municipality in the province of Ifugao, Philippines. According to the 2024 census, it has a population of 17,849 people.

It is the oldest town in the province. Kiangan was the former capital of Ifugao until the topology was deemed unfit and moved to neighboring Lagawe.

The Nagacadan Rice Terraces are part of the Rice Terraces of the Philippine Cordilleras World Heritage Site.

== Etymology ==
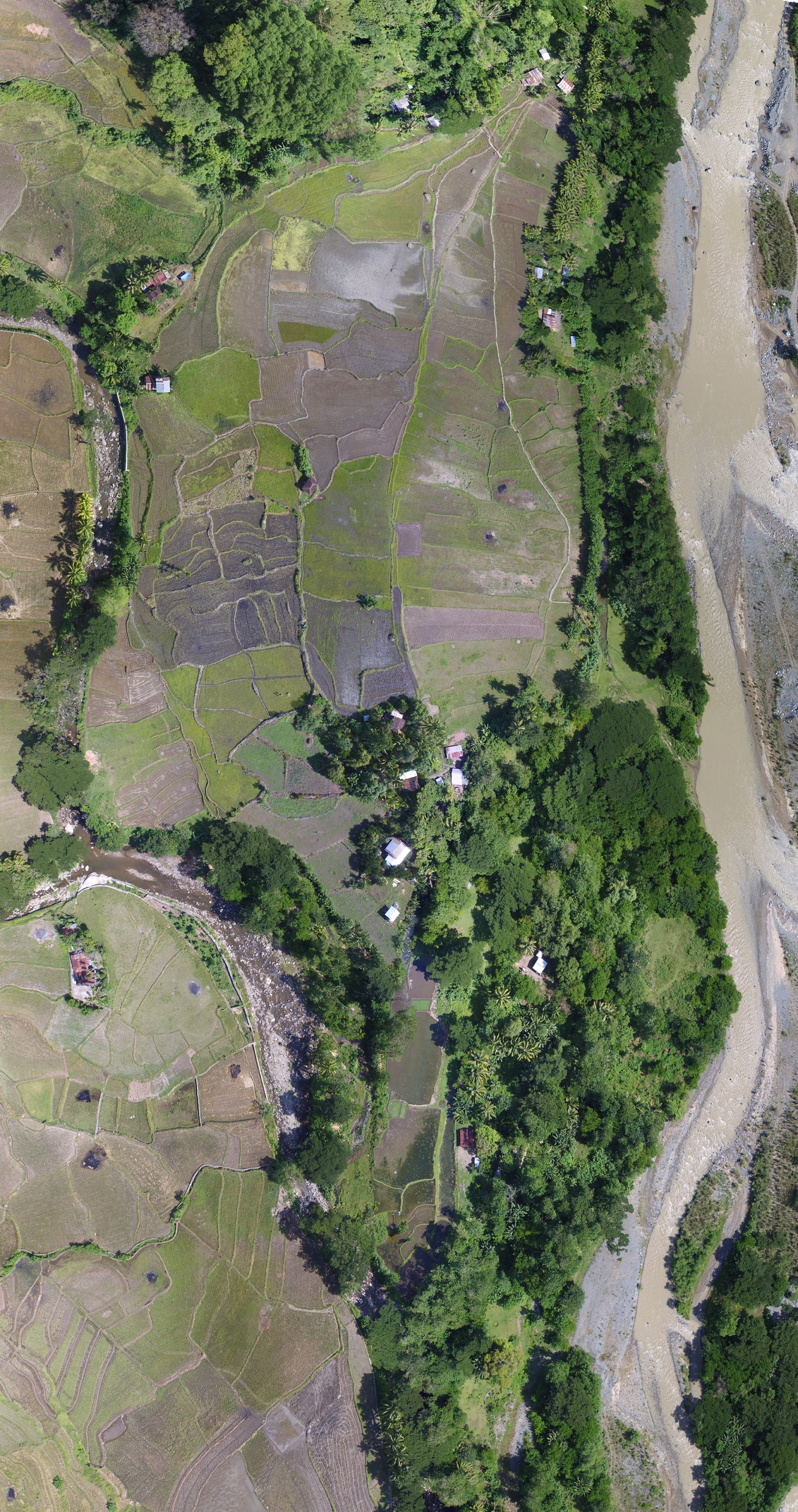
Old Kiyanggan Village

The town derives its name from Kiyyangan, an ancient village near the bank of the Ibulao River across the Lagawe valley. The name Kiyyangan is enshrined in Ifugao mythology and is believed to be the dwelling of Wigan and Bugan, the mythological ancestors of the Ifugao.

== History ==
The Old Kiyyangan Village (OKV) has been dated back to as early as 810 Before Present (B.P) to 750 B.P. This site is associated with the Ifugao culture and where the Ifugao Indigenous group presided for a few hundred years. The Ifugao Filipino Indigenous society are the main and only known community to occupy the Old Kiyyangan Village site.

Kiangan was the historic capital of Ifugao throughout the Spanish, American and Japanese occupations. It lost the position to Lagawe in 1949. In 1959, Lamut was carved out from Kiangan, followed by Asipulo in 1992.

== Geography ==
Kiangan is situated 10.34 kilometres (6.42 mi) from the provincial capital Lagawe, and 355.61 kilometres (220.97 mi) from the country's capital city of Manila.

=== Barangays ===
Kiangan is politically subdivided into 14 barangays. Each barangay consists of puroks and some have sitios.

- Ambabag
- Baguinge
- Bolog
- Bokiawan
- Dalligan
- Duit
- Hucab
- Julongan
- Lingay
- Mungayang
- Nagacadan
- Pindongan
- Poblacion
- Tuplac

=== Climate ===
Climate data for Kiangan, Ifugao
Month	Jan	Feb	Mar	Apr	May	Jun	Jul	Aug	Sep	Oct	Nov	Dec	Year
Mean daily maximum °C (°F)	21 (70)	22 (72)	24 (75)	25 (77)	25 (77)	25 (77)	24 (75)	24 (75)	24 (75)	24 (75)	23 (73)	21 (70)	24 (74)
Mean daily minimum °C (°F)	14 (57)	15 (59)	16 (61)	18 (64)	19 (66)	19 (66)	19 (66)	19 (66)	19 (66)	17 (63)	16 (61)	15 (59)	17 (63)
Average precipitation mm (inches)	35 (1.4)	46 (1.8)	63 (2.5)	117 (4.6)	402 (15.8)	400 (15.7)	441 (17.4)	471 (18.5)	440 (17.3)	258 (10.2)	94 (3.7)	68 (2.7)	2,835 (111.6)
Average rainy days	9.9	11.1	13.9	18.9	26.0	27.3	28.9	28.5	26.1	19.7	14.5	12.8	237.6
Source: Meteoblue

== Demographics ==
Population census of Kiangan
Year	Pop.	±% p.a.
1918	37,161	—
1939	16,146	−3.89%
1948	10,534	−4.63%
1960	12,689	+1.56%
1970	15,123	+1.77%
1975	15,935	+1.05%
1980	17,481	+1.87%
1990	21,329	+2.01%
1995	13,514	−8.20%
2000	14,099	+0.91%
2007	15,448	+1.27%
2010	15,837	+0.91%
2015	17,048	+1.41%
2020	17,691	+0.78%
2024	17,849	+0.21%
Source: Philippine Statistics Authority

In the 2024 census, the population of Kiangan was 17,849 people, with a density of 89 inhabitants per square kilometre or 230 inhabitants per square mile.

=== Languages ===
Dialects spoken in Kiangan include Ifugao, Tuwali, Ayangan, Ilocano, Tagalog, and English.

== Economy ==
Poverty incidence of Kiangan (%)

Source: Philippine Statistics Authority

Agriculture and tourism are the main sources of local economic activities which supports commerce and trade among townsfolk. Its terraced rice fields do not only provide produce for the farmers but attract tourists as well.

== Government ==
=== Local government ===
Kiangan, belonging to the lone congressional district of the province of Ifugao, is governed by a mayor designated as its local chief executive and by a municipal council as its legislative body in accordance with the Local Government Code. The mayor, vice mayor, and the councilors are elected directly by the people through an election which is being held every three years.

=== Elected officials ===
Members of the Municipal Council (2025–2028)
Position	Name
Congressman	Solomon R. Chungalao
Mayor	Raldis Andrei A. Bulayungan
Vice-Mayor	Michelle Alice B. Baguilat
Councilors	Clarence B. Buyuccan
Councilors	Lawrence A. Dulnuan Jr.
Councilors	Angelito D. Dulinayan
Councilors	Kimmayong D. Uyan
Councilors	Manuel T. Buhong Sr.
Councilors	Roel Francis A. Dulnuan
Councilors	Raiza D. Gawi
Councilors	Carol I. Talib

== Culture ==
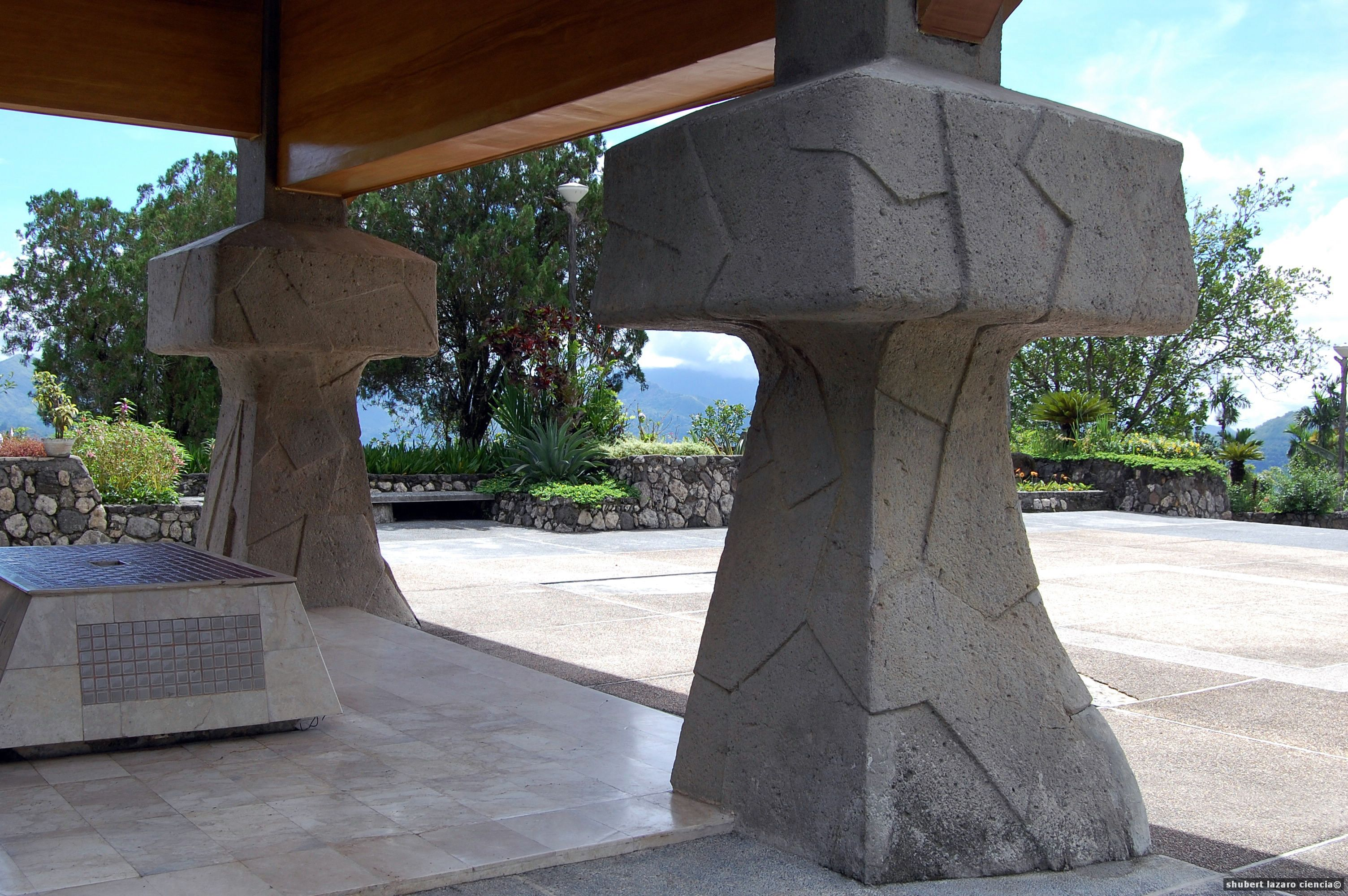
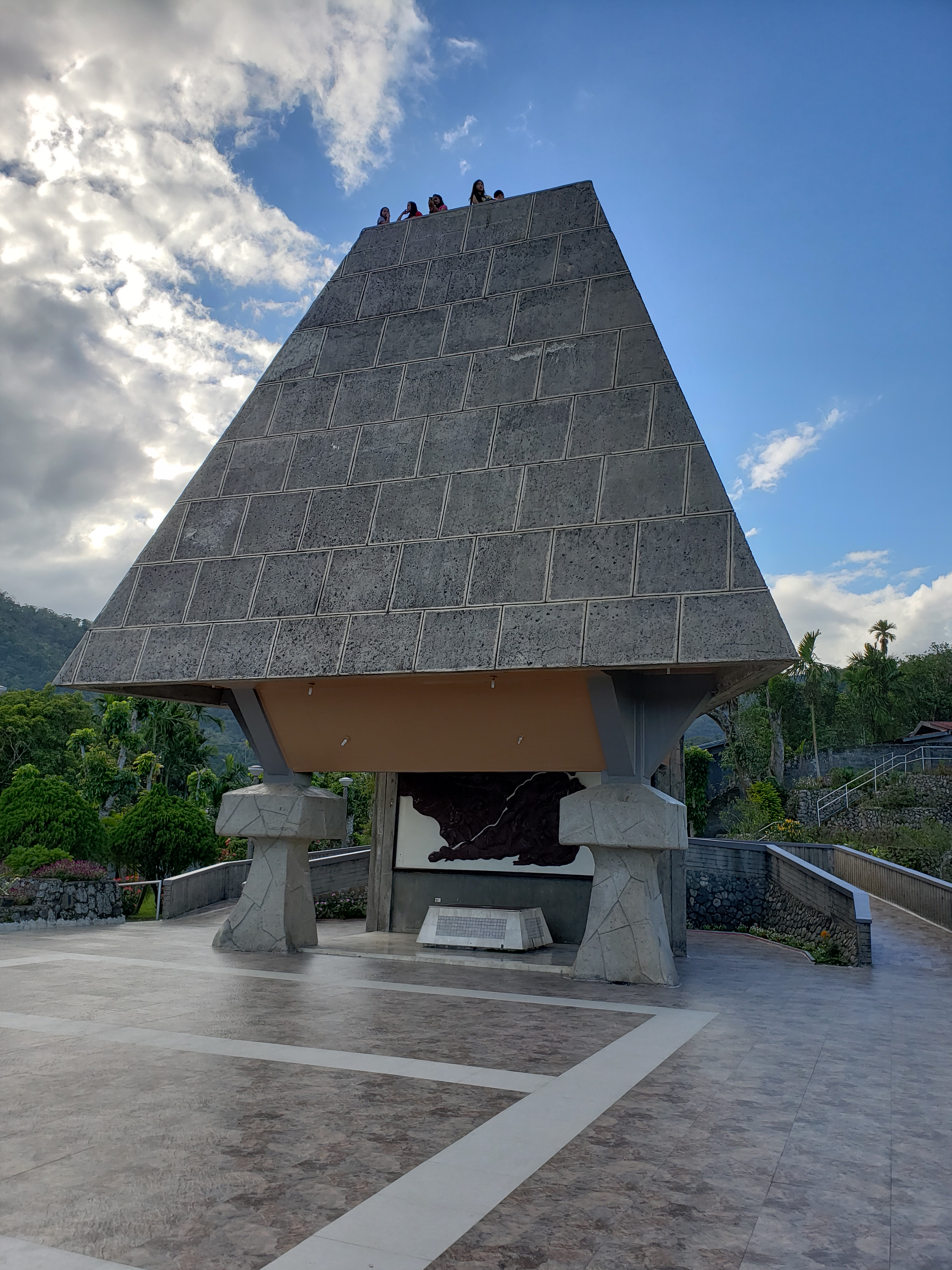
War memorial
- Nagacadan Rice Terraces

The Nagacadan Rice Terraces is a UNESCO Heritage Site and one of the many rice terraces in the province of Ifugao. The rice terraces cluster manifest a distinct feature - the fields are in ascending rows of terraces bisected by a river.

- Kiangan Shrine

Located in Kiangan is the Kiangan Central School old home economics building, which marks the spot where the highest Commander of the Japanese Imperial Army, General Tomoyuki Yamashita (also known as the Tiger of Malaya), surrendered to the Filipino & American Forces on 2 September 1945.

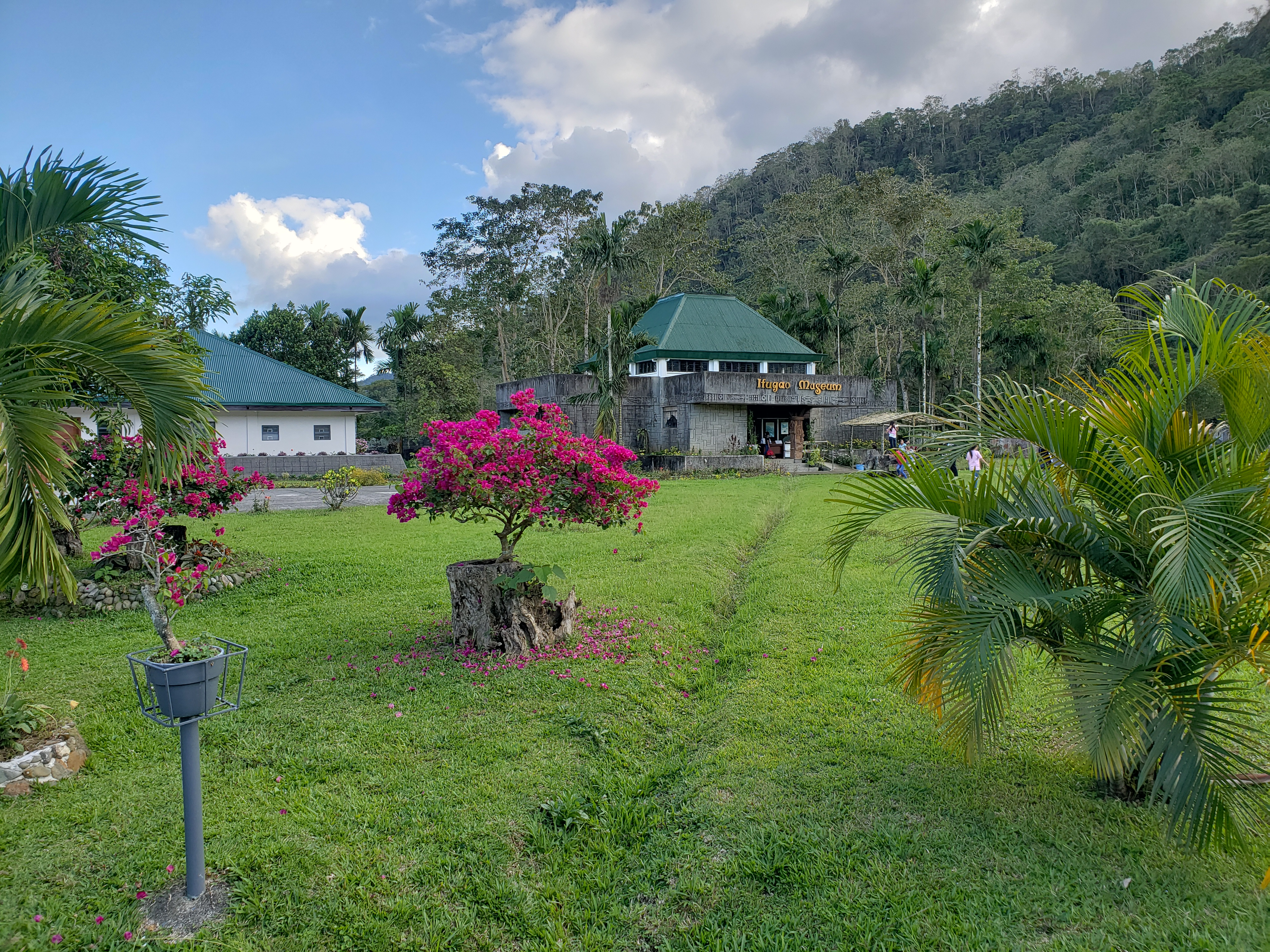
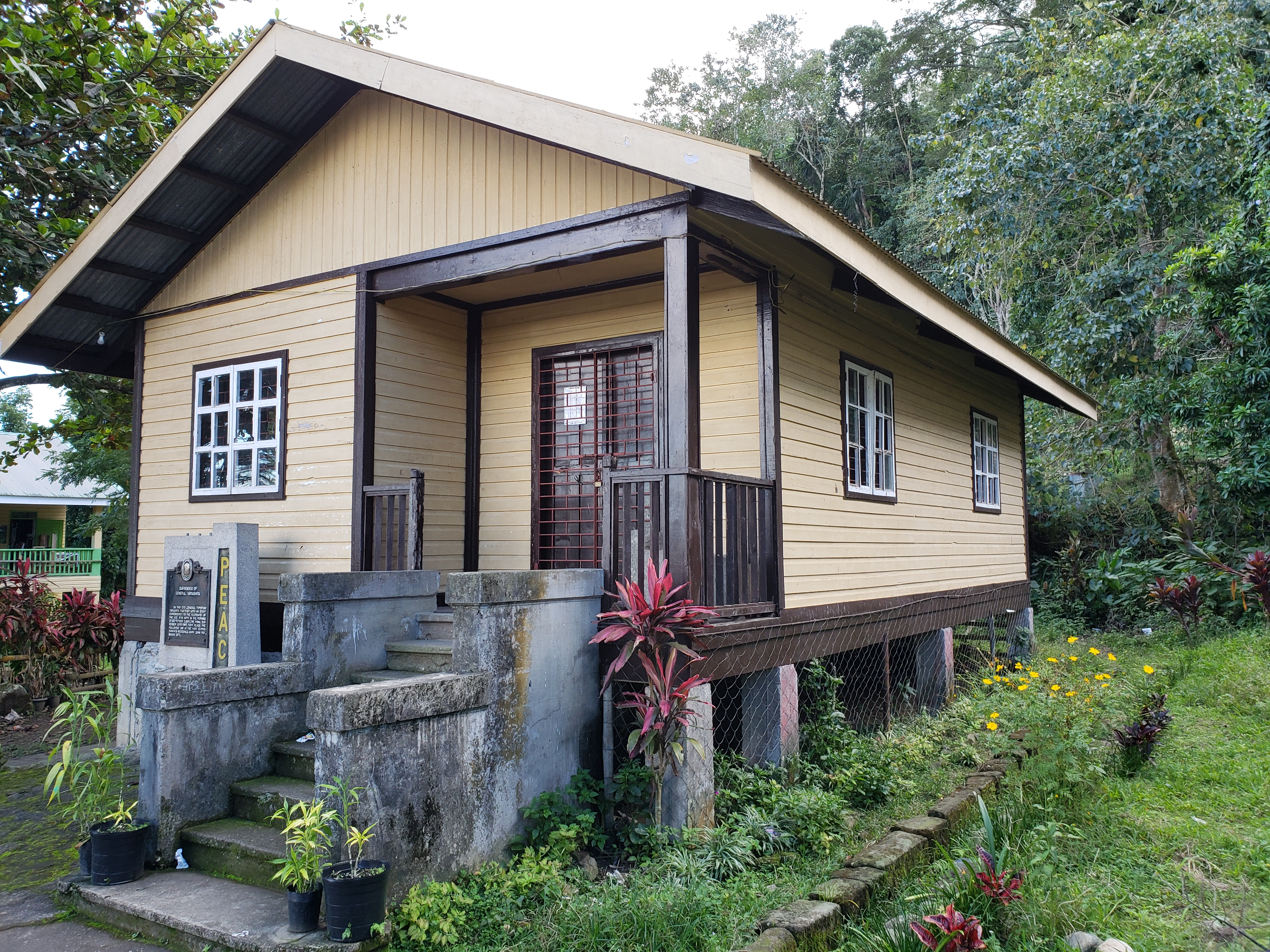
Ifugao Museum (left) and Yamashita surrender site (right)

== Education ==
The Kiangan Schools District Office governs all educational institutions within the municipality. It oversees the management and operations of all private and public, from primary to secondary schools.

=== Primary and elementary schools ===
- Alimit Elementary School
- Baguinge Elementary School
- Bokiawan Elementary School
- Bolog Elementary School
- Dalligan Elementary School
- Duit Elementary School
- Hucab Elementary School
- Julongan Elementary School
- Kiangan Central School
- Mappit Elementary School
- Mungayang Elementary School
- Nagacadan Elementary School
- Nungkigadan Elementary School
- Pindongan Elementary School
- Tuplac Elementary School

=== Secondary schools ===
- Kiangan National High School
- Mungayang National High School
- St. Joseph's School
- The Ifugao Academy
- Riverview Polytechnic and Academic School, Inc
