= Euro College =

Coordinates: 42.1390°N 21.7188°E

- Other names: Higher Education Professional Institution for Business Studies "Euro College" Kumanovo
- Type: Private
- Location: Kumanovo, North Macedonia
- Website: eurocollege.edu.mk

Euro College was founded in 2003 in the city of Kumanovo, North Macedonia. The college immediately signed an agreement with North European Studies from Greece, which allowed it to deliver Business Administration courses under the program of Chartered Management Institute, UK. In the period between 2004 and 2008, the college has been cooperating with a number of foreign universities and colleges, the most notable being University of London, University of Wales, Kensington College of Business and London City College. On 26 February 2008, Euro College got accredited by the Accreditation Board of the Ministry of Education of the Republic of North Macedonia.

In 2011, Euro College was accredited by IDEAL (International Distance Education Accreditation League) — a renowned international accrediting agency consisted of academic professionals from Asia, USA and Europe.

In 2015, Euro College became a holder of Erasmus Charter for Higher Education. As part of the charter projects, Euro College partnered with various universities from Italy, Portugal, Croatia, Albania, Lithuania, Russia, Japan, Malaysia, Mexico, Indonesia, Nepal, Sri Lanka, Philippines, Brazil and USA.

In 2018 Euro College became a validated partner of London Metropolitan University (a UK public university) offering Bachelor and Master courses in the area of Business Administration, Music Business, Computer Networking and Cybersecurity and International Event, Leisure and Tourism.

In 2024, Euro College became a partner institution of Charisma University (nationally accredited university by the Ministry of Education of Turks and Caicos and Transnational Association of Christian Colleges and Schools (TRACS), USA).

In 2024, Euro College became an approved center of ICM (Institute of Commercial Management, UK) offering short courses in the area of business and tourism and hospitality.
