= Lamut, Ifugao =

Lamut
- Municipality
- Municipality of Lamut
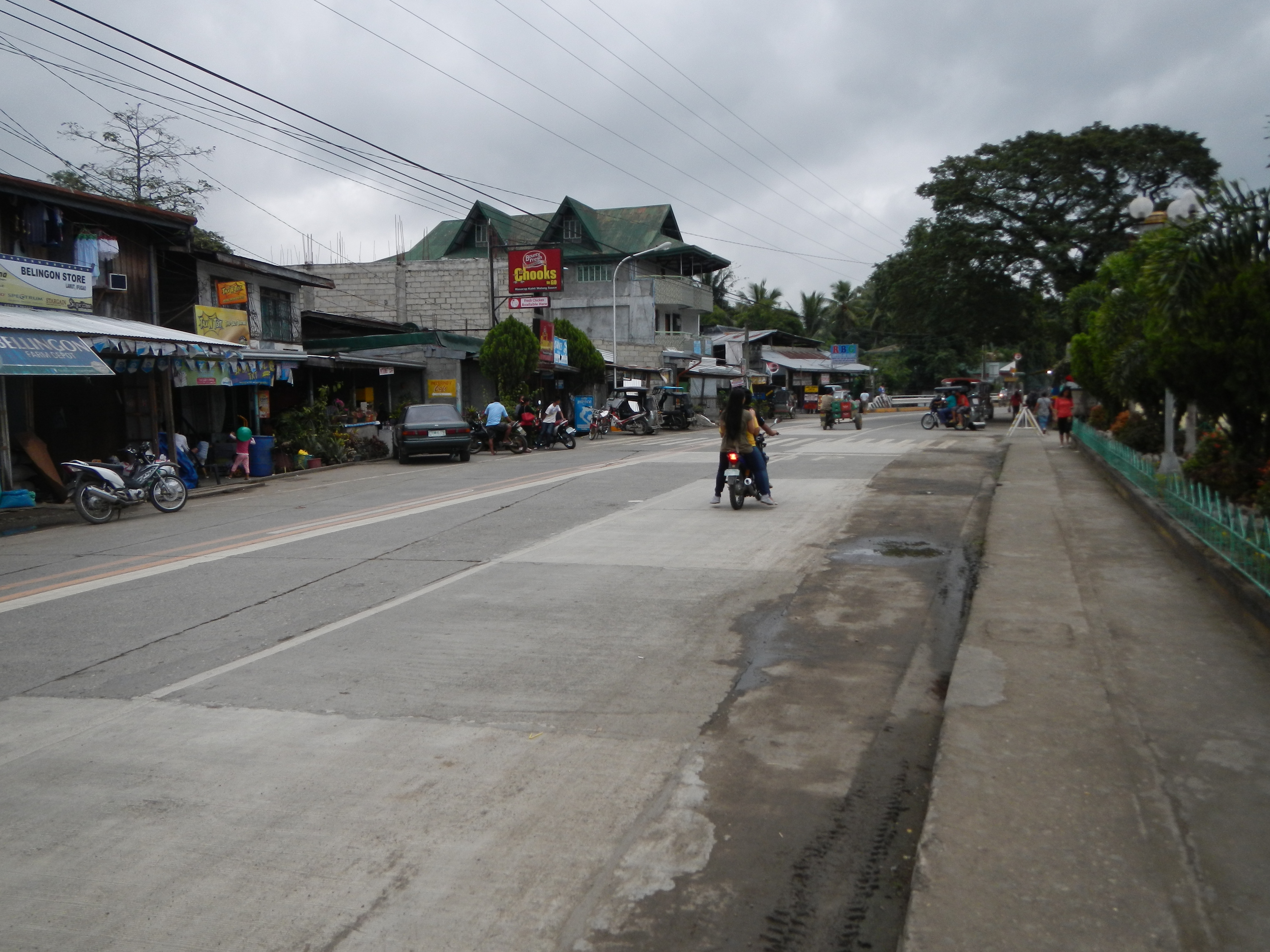
- Downtown area

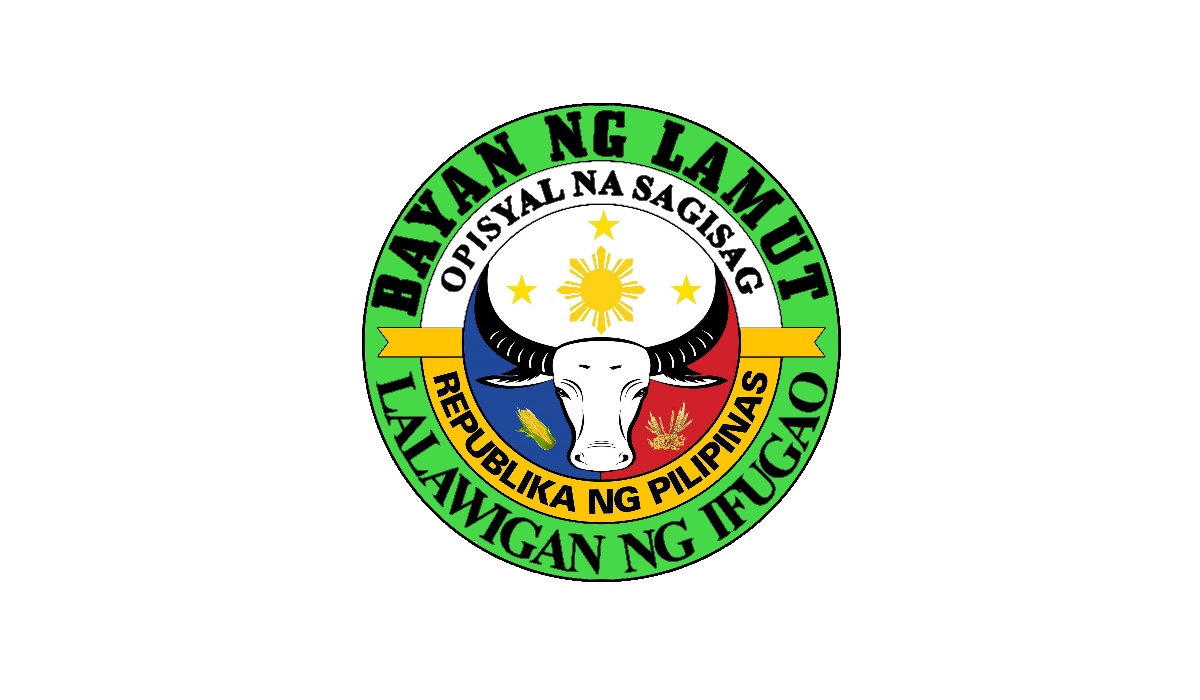
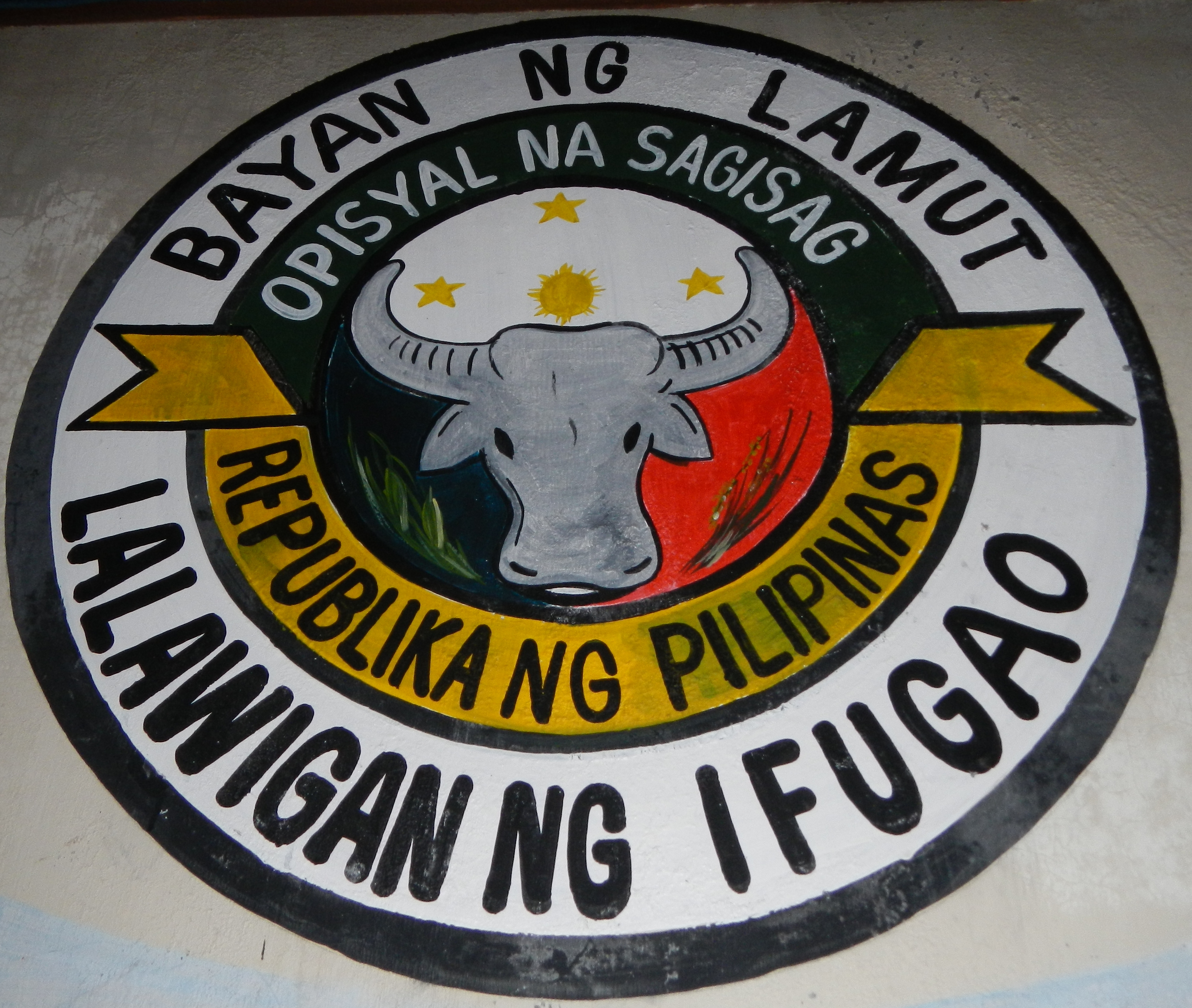
- Flag Seal

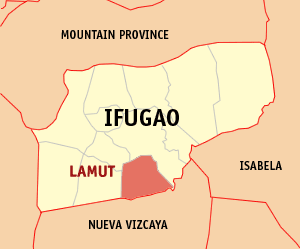
- Map of Ifugao with Lamut highlighted
- Interactive map of Lamut
- Location within the Philippines
- Coordinates: 16°39′06″N 121°13′04″E
- Country: Philippines
- Region: Cordillera Administrative Region
- Province: Ifugao
- District: Lone district
- Founded: 1959
- Barangays: 18 (see Barangays)

Government
  - Type: Sangguniang Bayan
  - Mayor: Atty. Mariano B. Buyagawan Jr.
  - Vice Mayor: Atty. Brix Paul B. Chaguile
  - Representative: Solomon Chungalao
  - Municipal Council: Members: Edgar L. Tapo; Condrado T. Buccat; John P. Dulinayan; Doreen N. Banhan; Kerajie Ryne D. Bimmulog; Jaime B. Bantiyan; Rosendo T. Antonio; Manuel B. Kalahi Jr.
  - Electorate: 18,352 voters (2025)

Area
  - Total: 159.65 km^{2} (61.64 sq mi)
- Elevation: 246 m (807 ft)
- Highest elevation: 415 m (1,362 ft)
- Lowest elevation: 203 m (666 ft)

Population (2024 census)
  - Total: 26,520
  - Density: 166.1/km^{2} (430.2/sq mi)
  - Households: 6,224

Economy
  - Income class: 2nd municipal income class
  - Poverty incidence: 6.03% (2023)
  - Revenue: ₱ 195 million (2024)
  - Assets: ₱ 415.6 million (2024)
  - Expenditure: ₱ 164.2 million (2024)
  - Liabilities: ₱ 41.27 million (2024)

Service provider
  - Electricity: Ifugao Electric Cooperative (IFELCO)
- Time zone: UTC+8 (PST)
- ZIP code: 3605
- PSGC: 1402705000
- IDD : area code: +63 (0)74
- Native languages: Ifugao; Tuwali; Ilocano; Tagalog
- Website: lamut.gov.ph

Lamut, officially the Municipality of Lamut is a municipality in the province of Ifugao, Philippines. According to the 2024 census, it has a population of 26,520 people.

The town is the gateway to Ifugao. IFSU Main Campus is located in Nayon and IPSHS is located in Mabato-bato.

== History ==
In 1959, the barrios of Lamut, Mabatobato, Lawig, Panopdopan, Magulon, Peiza, Payawan, Nayon, Halog, Pulaan, Dilan, Pangka, Hapid, Bulao, Allupapan, Pugol and Salamagui of the municipal district of Kiangan were separated from the said municipal district and constituted into the municipal district of Lamut. It was then composed of 4 barangays, namely: Mabatobato, Payawan, Nayon and Panopdopan.

The first appointed municipal mayor was Guinid Tuguinay who was later replaced by Alberto Puguon through a formal election held in November 1967, to December 1963. From January 1964 to December 1967, the municipal mayor was Alberto Bunoan, Sr. He was succeeded by Angelito Guinid from January 1968 to November 24, 1976, who was in turn succeeded by Gregorio Kitong who was appointed as municipal mayor. Kitong served until January 1986. When Corazon C. Aquino became president, she appointed lawyer Lynda Bongyo-Chaguile as the O.I.C. mayor of Lamut and continued to serve until 1998. Chaguile was the first woman to serve as mayor in Lamut and in the province.

== Geography ==
Lamut is situated 25.63 kilometres (15.93 mi) from the provincial capital Lagawe, and 320.61 kilometres (199.22 mi) from the country's capital city of Manila.

=== Barangays ===
Lamut is politically subdivided into 18 barangays. Each barangay consists of puroks and some have sitios.

- Ambasa
- Bimpal
- Hapid
- Holowon
- Lawig
- Lucban
- Mabatobato
- Magulon
- Nayon
- Panopdopan
- Payawan
- Pieza
- Poblacion East (Lamut)
- Poblacion West (Lamut)
- Pugol (Ifugao Reservation)
- Salamague
- Sanafe
- Umilag

=== Climate ===
Climate data for Lamut, Ifugao
Month	Jan	Feb	Mar	Apr	May	Jun	Jul	Aug	Sep	Oct	Nov	Dec	Year
Mean daily maximum °C (°F)	24 (75)	26 (79)	28 (82)	31 (88)	31 (88)	31 (88)	30 (86)	30 (86)	29 (84)	28 (82)	27 (81)	24 (75)	28 (83)
Mean daily minimum °C (°F)	19 (66)	19 (66)	20 (68)	22 (72)	23 (73)	24 (75)	23 (73)	23 (73)	23 (73)	22 (72)	21 (70)	20 (68)	22 (71)
Average precipitation mm (inches)	119 (4.7)	83 (3.3)	54 (2.1)	37 (1.5)	133 (5.2)	132 (5.2)	161 (6.3)	163 (6.4)	153 (6.0)	142 (5.6)	160 (6.3)	224 (8.8)	1,561 (61.4)
Average rainy days	18.4	13.6	11.6	9.4	19.3	21.9	23.9	23.4	21.1	16.3	18.1	21.4	218.4
Source: Meteoblue

== Demographics ==
Population census of Lamut
Year	Pop.	±% p.a.
1960	5,554	—
1970	8,068	+3.80%
1975	9,416	+3.15%
1980	11,017	+3.19%
1990	14,101	+2.50%
1995	17,081	+3.66%
2000	18,731	+2.00%
2007	22,109	+2.31%
2010	23,088	+1.59%
2015	25,279	+1.74%
2020	26,235	+0.78%
2024	26,520	+0.26%
Source: Philippine Statistics Authority

In the 2024 census, the population of Lamut was 26,520 people, with a density of 170 inhabitants per square kilometre or 440 inhabitants per square mile.

== Economy ==
Poverty incidence of Lamut (%)

Source: Philippine Statistics Authority

Agriculture serves as the primary economic sector in Lamut, producing crops like rice and corn. Commercial activities concentrate in the Lamut Trading Post by celebrating trade fairs during the Rambakan Festival.

== Government ==
=== Local government ===
Lamut, belonging to the lone congressional district of the province of Ifugao, is governed by a mayor designated as its local chief executive and by a municipal council as its legislative body in accordance with the Local Government Code. The mayor, vice mayor, and the councilors are elected directly by the people through an election which is being held every three years.

=== Elected officials ===
Members of the Municipal Council (2025–2028)
Position	Name
Congressman	Solomon R. Chungalao
Mayor	Atty. Mariano B. Buyagawan Jr.
Vice-Mayor	Atty. Brix Paul B. Chaguile
Councilors	Edgar L. Tapo
Councilors	Condrado T. Buccat
Councilors	John P. Dulinayan
Councilors	Doreen N. Banhan
Councilors	Kerajie Ryne D. Bimmulog
Councilors	Jaime B. Bantiyan
Councilors	Rosendo T. Antonio
Councilors	Manuel B. Kalahi Jr.
ABC President Lamut Chapter	Ronald J. Daulayan
SK Federation President	Meaghan H. Luis
Indigenous Peoples Mandatory Representatives	Nestor K. Taguiling

== Education ==
The Lamut Schools District Office governs all educational institutions within the municipality. It oversees the management and operations of all private and public, from primary to secondary schools.

=== Primary and elementary schools ===
- Bliss Elementary School
- Dunuan Elementary School
- Hapid Elementary School
- Ilap Elementary School
- Jolowon Elementary School
- Lamut Central School
- Lawig Elementary School
- Lucban Elementary School
- Mabatobato Elementary School
- Magulon Elementary School
- Mawanini Primary School
- Mongilit Ligmayo Memorial Elementary School
- Nayon Elementary School
- Nunhabatan Elementary School
- Panopdopan Elementary School
- Pieza Elementary School
- Precious Ones Learning Center
- Pugol Elementary School
- Pulaan Primary School
- Regimental Elementary School
- Salamague Elementary School
- Sanafe Elementary School
- Umilag Elementary School
- UCCP Christian Learning Center
- Westville Christian Academy

=== Secondary schools ===
- Alupapan Integrated School
- Hapid National High School
- Ifugao Provincial Science High School
- Lawig National High School (Main)
- Lawig National High School (Extension)
- Mongilit Ligmayo National High School
- San Francisco High School

=== Technical and vocational school ===
- Ifugao Technical Vocational School
