= Lagawe =

Capital of Ifugao, Philippines

- Municipality
- Municipality of Lagawe
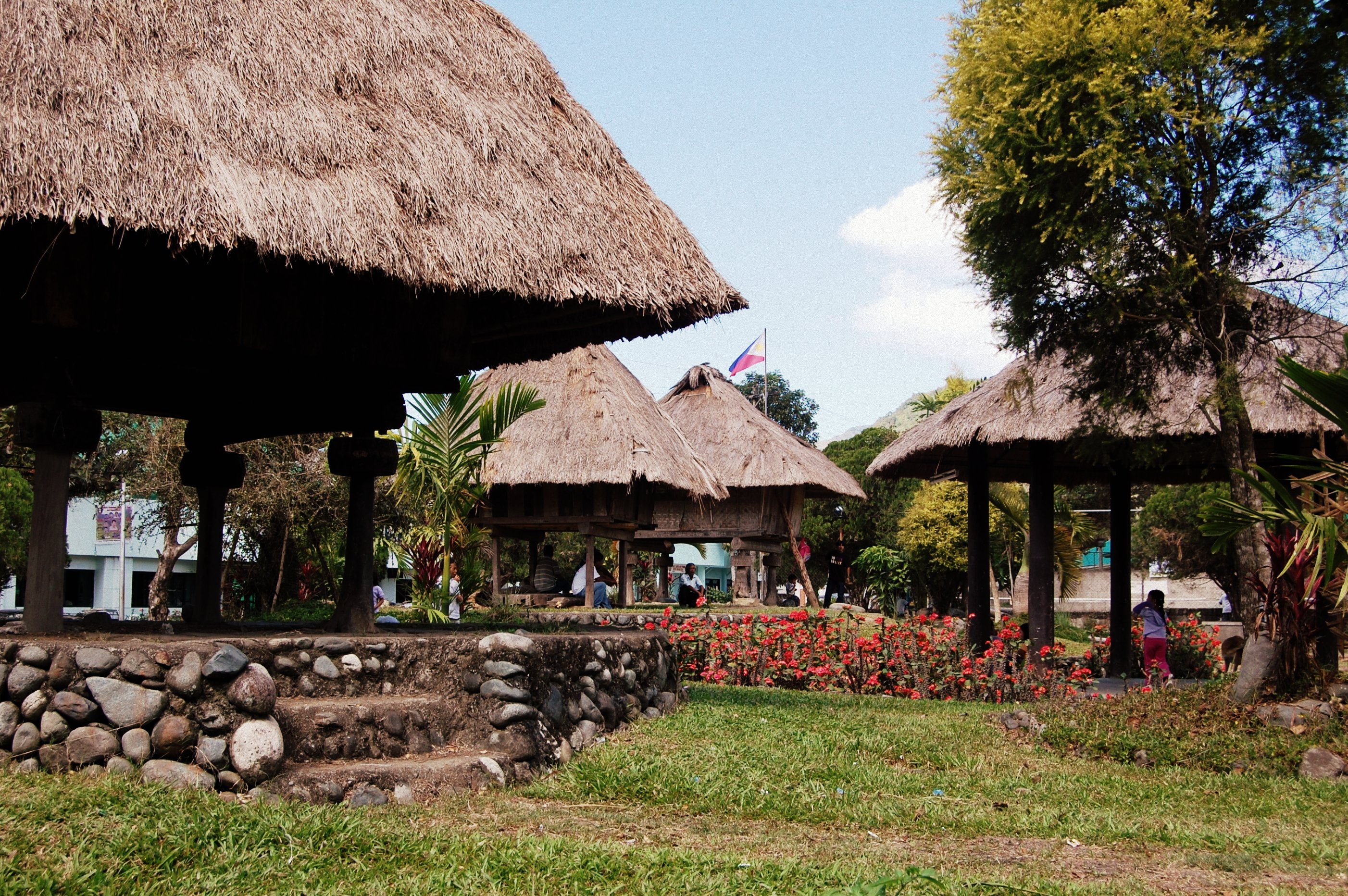
- Ifugao House on Ifugao Capitol grounds

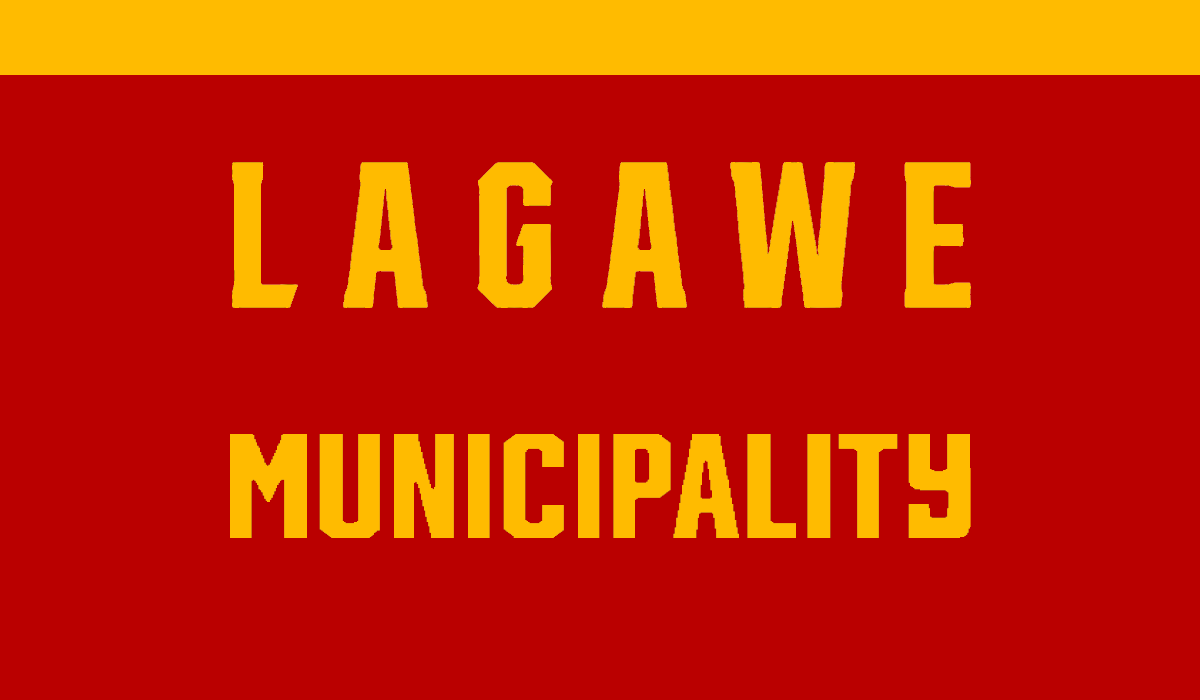
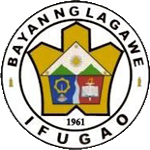
- Flag Seal

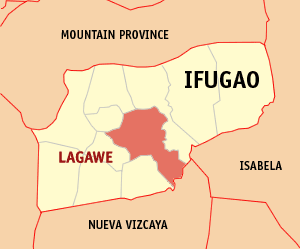
- Map of Ifugao with Lagawe highlighted
- Interactive map of Lagawe
- Location within the Philippines
- Coordinates: 16°47′51″N 121°07′22″E
- Country: Philippines
- Region: Cordillera Administrative Region
- Province: Ifugao
- District: Lone district
- Founded: 1961
- Barangays: 20 (see Barangays)

Government
  - Type: Sangguniang Bayan
  - Mayor: Leslie Roy H. Nayahangan
  - Vice Mayor: Gregorio G. Dangayo Jr.
  - Representative: Solomon Chungalao
  - Municipal Council: Members: Marlon B. Bandao; Clarence D. Buhong; Jan Gulf B. Luglug; Eric Jason B. Dugyon; Reynold A. Kimayong; Neil L. Wangiwang; Jansen G. Roldan; Vilma T. Alcayna
  - Electorate: 13,775 voters (2025)

Area
  - Total: 208.91 km^{2} (80.66 sq mi)
- Elevation: 667 m (2,188 ft)
- Highest elevation: 1,206 m (3,957 ft)
- Lowest elevation: 366 m (1,201 ft)

Population (2024 census)
  - Total: 19,124
  - Density: 91.542/km^{2} (237.09/sq mi)
  - Households: 4,426

Economy
  - Income class: 3rd municipal income class
  - Poverty incidence: 3.4% (2023)
  - Revenue: ₱ 166.1 million (2024)
  - Assets: ₱ 321.7 million (2024)
  - Expenditure: ₱ 159.7 million (2024)
  - Liabilities: ₱ 59.2 million (2024)

Service provider
  - Electricity: Ifugao Electric Cooperative (IFELCO)
- Time zone: UTC+8 (PST)
- ZIP code: 3600
- PSGC: 1402704000
- IDD : area code: +63 (0)74
- Native languages: Ifugao; Tuwali; Ilocano; Tagalog
- Website: www.lagawe.gov.ph

Lagawe [lɐˈgawe], officially the Municipality of Lagawe (Ilocano: Ili ti Lagawe), is a municipality and capital of the province of Ifugao, Philippines. According to the 2024 census, it has a population of 19,124 people.

== Geography ==
Lagawe is situated 350.57 kilometres (217.83 mi) from the country's capital city of Manila.

=== Barangays ===
Lagawe is politically subdivided into 20 barangays. Each barangay consists of puroks and some have sitios.

- Abinuan
- Banga
- Boliwong
- Burnay
- Buyabuyan
- Caba
- Cudog
- Dulao
- Jucbong
- Luta
- Montabiong
- Olilicon
- Poblacion East
- Poblacion North
- Poblacion South
- Poblacion West
- Ponghal
- Pullaan
- Tungngod
- Tupaya

=== Climate ===
Climate data for Lagawe, Ifugao
Month	Jan	Feb	Mar	Apr	May	Jun	Jul	Aug	Sep	Oct	Nov	Dec	Year
Mean daily maximum °C (°F)	25 (77)	26 (79)	28 (82)	30 (86)	29 (84)	29 (84)	28 (82)	28 (82)	28 (82)	28 (82)	27 (81)	26 (79)	28 (82)
Mean daily minimum °C (°F)	18 (64)	19 (66)	20 (68)	22 (72)	23 (73)	23 (73)	23 (73)	23 (73)	23 (73)	21 (70)	20 (68)	19 (66)	21 (70)
Average precipitation mm (inches)	38 (1.5)	57 (2.2)	77 (3.0)	141 (5.6)	390 (15.4)	355 (14.0)	426 (16.8)	441 (17.4)	426 (16.8)	259 (10.2)	97 (3.8)	57 (2.2)	2,764 (108.9)
Average rainy days	10.4	12.1	15.4	20.4	26.7	27.1	28.7	28.0	26.4	19.9	14.1	12.3	241.5
Source: Meteoblue

== Demographics ==
Population census of Lagawe
Year	Pop.	±% p.a.
1939	13,204	—
1948	12,424	−0.67%
1960	13,694	+0.81%
1970	14,085	+0.28%
1975	13,948	−0.20%
1980	15,075	+1.57%
1990	12,437	−1.91%
1995	14,898	+3.44%
2000	15,269	+0.53%
2007	17,477	+1.88%
2010	18,077	+1.24%
2015	19,333	+1.29%
2020	18,876	−0.50%
2024	19,124	+0.31%
Source: Philippine Statistics Authority

In the 2024 census, the population of Lagawe was 19,124 people, with a density of 92 inhabitants per square kilometre or 240 inhabitants per square mile.

=== Language ===
Ifugao and Ilocano are the dominant dialects of Lagawe.

== Economy ==
Poverty incidence of Lagawe (%)

Source: Philippine Statistics Authority

Lagawe serves as the institutional and commercial center of Ifugao. Its economy relies on government services, agriculture, and micro-enterprises. As the provincial capital, Lagawe centers employment, government offices, and retail trade as the primary sectors of economy. Lagawe's agriculture produces crops and coffee for local consumption and trade.

== Government ==
=== Local government ===
Lagawe, belonging to the lone congressional district of the province of Ifugao, is governed by a mayor designated as its local chief executive and by a municipal council as its legislative body in accordance with the Local Government Code. The mayor, vice mayor, and the councilors are elected directly by the people through an election which is being held every three years.

=== Elected officials ===
Members of the Municipal Council (2025–2028)
Position	Name
Congressman	Solomon R. Chungalao
Mayor	Leslie Roy H. Nayahangan
Vice-Mayor	Gregorio G. Dangayo Jr.
Councilors	Jan Gulf B. Luglug
Councilors	Clarence D. Buhong
Councilors	Eric Jason B. Dugyon
Councilors	Neil L. Wangiwang
Councilors	Marlon B. Bandao
Councilors	Reynold A. Kimayong
Councilors	Vilma T. Alcayna
Councilors	Jansen G. Roldan

== Education ==
The Lagawe Schools District Office governs all educational institutions within the municipality. It oversees the management and operations of all private and public, from primary to secondary schools.

=== Primary and elementary schools ===
- Abinuan Elementary School
- Banga Elementary School
- Boliwong Elementary School
- Burnay Elementary School
- Buyabuyan Elementary School
- Caba Elementary School
- Cudog Elementary School
- Dulao Elementary School
- Hope Christian School of Ifugao
- Ifugao SPED Center
- Jucbong Elementary School
- Lagawe Central School
- Luta Primary School
- Montabiong Elementary School
- Olilicon Elementary School
- Ponghal Elementary School
- Pullaan Elementary School
- Tungngod Elementary School
- Tungngod Elementary School

=== Secondary schools ===
- Ayangan National Agricultural & Vocational High School
- Caba National High School
- CITAC Christian School
- Don Bosco High School
- Lagawe National High School
