= Solomon Chungalao =

Filipino lawyer and politician (born 1955)

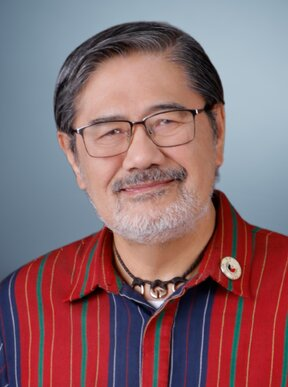
- Official portrait, 2026

Member of Philippine House of Representatives for Ifugao's at-large district
- Incumbent
- Assumed office June 30, 2019
- Preceded by: Teddy Baguilat
- In office June 30, 2001 – June 30, 2010
- Preceded by: Benjamin Cappleman
- Succeeded by: Teddy Baguilat
House positions
Member of the House Electoral Tribunal
Incumbent
Assumed office August 11, 2025
Chair of the House Agrarian Reform Committee
In office September 30, 2019 – June 30, 2025
Preceded by	Rene Relampagos
Succeeded by	Eleanor Begtang
Chair of the House National Cultural Communities Committee
In office August 3, 2004 – June 30, 2007
Preceded by	Laurence Wacnang
Succeeded by	Samuel Dangwa

Personal details
- Born: Solomon Ramirez Chungalao; December 4, 1955 (age 70) Banaue, Ifugao, Philippines
- Party: NPC (2018–present)
- Other political affiliations: Independent (2010–2018); Lakas (2007–2010); Liberal (2001–2007)
- Spouse: Grace Hora
- Profession: Lawyer

Solomon "Sol" Ramirez Chungalao (Filipino: [soloˈmon ˈtʃʊŋɡalaʊ]; born December 4, 1955) is a Filipino lawyer and politician who has served as the representative for the Ifugao's at-large congressional district in the Philippine House of Representatives since 2019, and previously from 2001 to 2010. He is currently a member of the Nationalist People's Coalition.

== Early life and education ==
Solomon Ramirez Chungalao was born on December 4, 1955, in Banaue, Ifugao, to Rufino Chungalao Sr. and Cesaria Ramirez. He attended the Baguio Colleges Foundation (now the University of the Cordilleras) where he earned a Bachelor of Laws degree.

== House of Representatives (2001–2010) ==
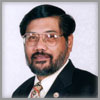
Chungalao in the 13th Congress

Chungalao was first elected to the House of Representatives in 2001, under the Liberal Party, representing Ifugao's lone district, succeeding former governor Benjamin Cappleman. By the end of his first term, he authored 52 bills and resolutions and co-authored 89 bills and resolutions.

He was re-elected in 2004 and served as the chairperson of the House National Cultural Communities Committee in the 13th Congress.

In 2007, Chungalao joined the ruling party Lakas–CMD and was re-elected to a third term. It was during his final term as congressman that House Bill No. 4409, which he principally authored and which became Republic Act No. 9720, was signed into law by President Gloria Macapagal Arroyo, converting Ifugao State College of Agriculture and Forestry into the Ifugao State University. Chungalao also supported charter change measures during the Arroyo administration that sought to convene the House as a constituent assembly to amend the 1987 Constitution.

== Gubernatorial and congressional bids (2010–2016) ==
After the end of his congressional tenure, having been term-limited, Chungalao ran for governor of Ifugao in the 2010 elections, but lost to the Liberal Party candidate Eugene Balitang.

He made a bid to return to the House in 2013 as an independent candidate, but lost to incumbent representative Teddy Baguilat. Chungalao ran against Baguilat for a second time in 2016, but again lost.

== Return to House of Representatives (2019–present) ==
Chungalao successfully ran in 2019 for Ifugao's lone district in the House of Representatives under the Nationalist People's Coalition. In the 18th Congress, he was elected chairman of the House Agrarian Reform Committee. He principally authored 106 bills and co-authored 46 bills in his fourth legislative term, at least 16 of which were enacted into law.

Chungalao was re-elected in 2022, serving in the 19th Congress as the Agrarian Reform Committee chairman for a second time. He supported a third proposal to create a Cordillera Autonomous Region in 2020, but stated that “time was running out” as interest in the region's establishment had been declining. He also denounced the erroneous portrayals of Igorots in learning modules distributed by the Department of Education in February 2021, prompting Chungalao and fellow Cordillera lawmakers to file House Resolution No. 1552. He was one of the 215 House members who signed the impeachment complaint against Vice President Sara Duterte that led to her first impeachment in February 2025.

In 2025, Chungalao ran for a third and final term, winning against civil engineer and Partido Federal ng Pilipinas candidate Francis Cuyop. On August 11, 2025, he was elected member of the House of Representatives Electoral Tribunal. He voted in favor of Duterte's second impeachment in May 2026.

=== Committee membership ===
==== 20th Congress ====
- Committee on Agriculture and Food
- Committee on Games and Amusements
- Committee on Health
- Committee on Housing and Urban Development
- Committee on Indigenous Cultural Communities and Indigenous Peoples
- Committee on National Defense and Security
- Committee on Natural Resources
- Committee on the North Luzon Growth Quadrangle
- Committee on People's Participation
- Committee on Public Works and Highways
- Committee on Suffrage and Electoral Reforms
- Committee on Veterans Affairs and Welfare
- Committee on Ways and Means

== Personal life ==
Chungalao is a member of the United Church of Christ in the Philippines. He is married to Grace Hora.

== Electoral history ==
Electoral history of Solomon Chungalao
Year	Office	Party	Votes received				Result
Year	Office	Party	Total	%	P.	Swing	Result
2001	Representative (Ifugao)	Liberal	—N/a	—N/a	1st	—N/a	Won
2004	Representative (Ifugao)	Liberal	—N/a	—N/a	1st	—N/a	Won
2007	Representative (Ifugao)	Lakas	—N/a	—N/a	1st	—N/a	Won
2013	Representative (Ifugao)	Independent	41,664	49.73%	2nd	—N/a	Lost
2016	Representative (Ifugao)	Independent	39,847	44.53%	2nd	−5.20	Lost
2019	Representative (Ifugao)	NPC	27,398	—N/a	1st	—N/a	Won
2022	Representative (Ifugao)	NPC	48,231	43.94%	1st	—N/a	Won
2025	Representative (Ifugao)	NPC	63,771	54.70%	1st	+10.76	Won
2010	Governor of Ifugao	Lakas	35,389	46.56%	2nd	—N/a	Lost

House of Representatives of the Philippines
Preceded by Teddy Baguilat	Member of Philippine House of Representatives for Ifugao's at-large district 2019–present	Incumbent
Preceded by Benjamin Cappleman	Member of Philippine House of Representatives for Ifugao's at-large district 2001–2010	Succeeded by Teddy Baguilat
