= OKV =

OKV may refer to:

- Old Kiyyangan Village, a Philippine archeological site
- Openbaar Kunstbezit Vlaanderen, a Belgian cultural organisation and the magazine it publishes
- okv, the ISO 639-3 code for Orokaiva, a variant of Orokaiva language
- Winchester Regional Airport, the FAA LID code OKV
