= Archaeology of the post-1500s Philippines =

The post-1500s Philippines is defined by colonial powers occupying the land. Whether it be the Spanish, the Americans, or the Japanese, the Philippines were subjugated and shaped by the presence of a hegemonic power enacting dominance over the people, the land, and the culture itself. The respective field of the archaeology of the post-1500s Philippines is a particularly growing and revolutionary field, particularly seen in the archaeology of Stephen Acabado in Ifugao and Grace Barretto-Tesoro in Manila. There were also many important events that had happened during this period. In 1521, Portuguese explorer, Ferdinand Magellan discovered Homonhon Island and called it "Arcigelago de San Lazaro." Magellan became the first European to cross over the Pacific Ocean.

The Post-1500s Philippines is an era of Philippine history defined by complex relationships between various ethnic groups underneath the umbrella of colonialism. Of particular note regarding the archaeology of the time period is Spanish colonialism and indigenous responses, particularly those of the Ifugao people. Recent scholarship has debunked preexistent narratives regarding the era of Spanish colonialism, particular considering indigenous responses and the complexities of ethnic diversity in the Spanish colony and its respective effects on the multicultural identity that defined the era.

== Context ==
The Post-1500s Philippines and the respective archaeology of the time period are inextricably connected to Spanish colonialism. One of their main purposes of Spanish occupation of the Philippine Archipelago was founded upon the conceived notion that it was a land of spices, which it was not. The Spaniards also came to the Philippines in the search for God, gold, and glory. In their desire to spread God, they found plenty of indigenous peoples who had not yet been introduced to Christianity. Bankoff and Boomgard further state that "glory was less certain; there were a few opportunities for gallant feats of arms and no mighty empires to topple," displaying that there was a lack of all three Gs. Instead, they looked at the trees that the forest provided and used the huge amounts of timber to reconstruct churches and build ships, which led to Spain’s establishment of a colony in the Philippines.

During this time Spain was leading in the race in European colonial endeavors. The Philippines was one of many places that Spain traveled to in order to build political ties and benefit economically. After the Spanish officially arrived in the Philippines, it took many years and several expeditions in order to achieve a piece of the lucrative spice trade, create political connections with China and Japan, and convert of local populations to Christianity. The Spanish foreign power invasion began with the establishment of settlements in Cebu in 1565 followed by the establishment of their capital in Manila in 1571. During this time the Spanish began converting local populations to Christianity via traditional local leaders that ruled in a traditional tribal organization, all indirectly for Spanish gain. It was upon this new political organization foundation that Spain worked to convert and exploit locals all for Spanish political and economic benefit. With them, they brought their religion, political organization, and thus the birth of a new cultural community. As Spanish foreign trade in the Philippines developed, so did Christian communities while Muslim and highland tribal communities retreated to the hills to avoid foreign invasion.

== Indigenous responses to Spanish colonialism ==
When discussing indigenous responses of Spanish colonialism in the Philippines and how it affected the social organization, politics, economics, and trade, it has become increasingly important to analyze the narratives surrounding the study. Much of the Philippines’ archaeological and historical narratives for a long time came from a largely Spanish-colonialist and Western perspective. Advances in archaeological studies in the Philippines are in the process of creating a more holistic and accurate historical narrative free from ethnocentric views. There is a persisting narrative that the Spanish colonized and controlled the entirety of the Philippines with indigenous people retaining no autonomy. This narrative is similar to the narrative of Spanish colonizing South America, with millions of indigenous people being forced to submit to the governance and cultures of people they may have never seen before.

Pericolonial archeology works to combat this preexisting narrative. Pioneered by Stephen Acabado, pericolonial archeology is the investigation of areas where European military efforts failed to conquer an area but did succeed to influence an area politically and economically through their influence in surrounding areas (Acabado 2016 p. 3). In the Philippines specifically, pericolonial archeology is the method of uncovering the history of Philippine groups that were able to counteract and resist Spanish colonization. By uncovering the archeological remains of the Philippine people that were actually not conquered by the Spanish (the Ifugao people), the current historical narrative with a sense of strong false differentiation can be refuted. False differentiation is a false sense of superiority, and in the case of the Philippines is reflected as a persisting idea that the Spanish completely conquered the Philippines, changing everything about them with indigenous peoples characterized as passive figures in their own history [3][8]. Archaeological remains in the Banaue rice fields, the Ifugao Old Kiyyangan Village, and lowland Magat Valley historical sites debunked present narratives in academia. Contrary to a popular belief that indigenous peoples were passive in their resistance to Spanish colonialism, pericolonial perspectives subvert this notion. In the Philippines, indigenous responses to Spanish colonialism were predicated on political and economic intensification as well as strengthened social organization and trading systems.

=== Magat Valley ===
Through relative dating techniques and exact dating techniques, archeologists have been able to study soil and faunal records, beads, pots, and architectural wonders from the lowlands of the Magat Valley and the upland Cordillera. It is through these findings that archeologists determined that the Ifugao people who ended up in the upland Cordillera had originally lived in the lowlands of the Magat Valley. Through archeological findings it has been determined that this migration occurred around the same time as the first Spanish colonialist endeavors. Archeologists believe that these people relocated to the highlands to maintain their autonomy and avoid Spanish rule. Archeological proof of this migration theory is seen through the Banaue rice terraces constructed by the Ifugao people around the time of Spanish colonialism. The idea is that in the face of Spanish invasion, the Ifugao people retreated to the mountains to strengthen their economic, political, and social ties to maintain autonomy via wet rice cultivation. Through the narrative constructed by the archaeological record, the Spanish are not the guiding force for the development of Ifugao society, they are simply the plight that drove indigenous peoples to band together to protect their independence.

Cultivation of wet-rice in the rice terraces required a newly strengthened social organization because of the intense labor it took to cultivate. The Ifugao people had to band together like never before to grow wet-rice in a region it was not typically grown. At the same time that wet-rice was being cultivated in the Ifugao region, there was an increase in earthenware pottery that had been used to house the Ifugao Banaue wet-rice, found in the uplands and lowlands. This indicates that the highland people were trading their wet-rice with the lowland regions that had come under Spanish control. Evidence of this trading system speaks to the strength of the Ifugao people to resist Spanish conquering through economic intensification of wet-rice as a resource that the Spanish wanted desperately (Acabado 2016 p. 8 & 21). Maintaining a strong trade system between the lowland people/Spanish also speaks to political intensification of Ifugao leadership. Thus, there is a direct connection between an increase in wet-rice production, earthenware pottery production, and trade to Spanish settlement in surrounding lowlands.

=== Old Kiyyangan Village ===
Discoveries in Old Kiyyangan Village site also speak to Ifugao autonomy. In both the Old Kiyyangan Village site and the lowland Magat Valley, porcelain pottery and fine exotic beads were unearthed. Since similar goods were found in both regions, archeologists can conclude that there was a continuous relationship and interaction between lowland and highland groups. Archeologists can also conclude that there was a strong trade system in the Philippines during Spanish colonialism that brought foreign luxury goods to groups that the Spanish had gained political control over and also to groups they had not gained political control over. This interaction through the trade of luxury foreign goods highlights a continuous interaction with lowland groups and highland groups (Acabado 2016 p. 17 & 21). A continued interaction between highland and lowland groups even in the face of Spanish colonialism defines the political and economic strength of the highland people during this time.

Another similarity between archeological findings from the same time period in the highlands and lowlands are faunal records. In both areas remains of pigs and water buffalo were found, which further proves the origins of the Ifugao people to be in the lowland valley. However, since water buffalo were of no help in agricultural practices in the mountain region, archeologists have come to the conclusion that groups in the Old Kiyyangan Village were consuming game-like water buffalo in feast ceremonies. Feasts of animals such as water buffalo, pig, and deer increased in the archeological record during Spanish colonial advances most likely to consolidate the economic and political strength of the people as well as to strengthen within-group ties (Acabado 2016 p. 17).

Through these pericolonial archeological findings, archeologists have concluded that not all people in the Philippines were directly conquered, though those who were not conquered still dealt with the effects of colonialism. This new evidence that Acabado highlights has helped conclude that some indigenous people resist colonialism through agricultural developments that intensified their economic, social, and political strength.

The persistent narrative regarding Spanish colonialism in the Philippines is one where indigenous people lacked the ability to withstand colonial influence and power. The pericolonial archaeology of Stephen Acabado and others who study Ifugao serve the purpose of redefining a narrative by depicting indigenous peoples’ agency in the midst of Spanish colonialism.

== Multicultural identity in Manila ==
=== Reduccion in San Juan ===
Manila, the modern-day capital of the Philippines, played an essential role as a political stronghold amidst the Spanish colonial era in the Philippines. The archaeological record has proven insightful in illuminating the complexity of Filipino identity during this era. Spanish colonialism had a considerable effect upon the indigenous peoples living in the Philippines, as the colonial rule enacted laws that forced indigenous life to completely transform. Laws of the Indies ordinances predicated on the spread of Christianity were established by the Spanish Colonial Government. These enforced laws were seen in the discovery of two stone ruins in Batangas, a locality in modern-day Metro Manila. Thus, forced resettlement of villages, also known as reduccion, accelerated the spread of Christianity as the hegemonic Spanish managed to place the church at the center of the colonial establishment, establishing a hierarchy in which the indigenous people were placed at the bottom. This enacting of the Laws of the Indies is reflected in the municipality of San Juan, where the archaeological record provides evidence of a plaza complex in the Philippines, with households, a church, a municipal hall, and household units constructed from tuff blocks, mortar, roof tiles, galvanized iron sheets, and wooden boards. Excavations in the area found that all of the necessary aspects and elements of a colonial town were archaeologically present in Barangay Pinagbayanan, the specific location in San Juan that included the aforementioned remains. The lack of any cultural materials dated before the 1800s is revelatory in that it illuminates the fact that the region was a forced reduccion area. Of note is the respective discovery of both Chinese ceramics and Western medicines in the region, reflective of the complex diversity at the heart of the Spanish colonial capital of Manila.

=== Complexity in Parian ===
Also notable during Manila’s period of Spanish colonialism is the presence of the Chinese in Manila, many of whom were attracted to Manila due to the trans-Pacific Galleon trade route. In this sense, Manila was a truly global city. From the Spanish walled city of Intramuros to the Chinese hub of Parian, Manila was a diverse realm of cultures that was a microcosm of the complex Philippine identity. The respective regions that were created are a systemic byproduct of the hegemonic Spanish colonial forces, and Parian is exemplary of this. Parian is noted as the first Chinatown in world history and had two specific roles. The two roles it fulfilled were as a residential area for ethnic Chinese and as the commercial center for the colony itself. Fujian is the homeland of many of the many diasporic Chinese, specifically the southern province known as Minnan. Though there was a connection to their homeland as seen in the porcelain found in Parian, the diasporic Chinese had significant connections to the localities and peoples in Manila. Colonial-style earthenware and indigenous decorative earthenware were all found in Parian, evidence of the Chinese diaspora’s potential networking with other ethnic groups. The Chinese controlled much of the domestic trade, and they were subsequently able to negotiate with the Spanish, allowing the Spanish to strengthen their connections with domestic markets, increasing the potential for trade. Ceramics with a Pampangan-origin Pulong Bakaw tradition were also found in excavations in Parian, potential evidence of a connection between the Chinese and Pampangan people. This contrasts pervasive narratives in the history of the Chinese and indigenous peoples’ relationships, particularly when considering the Pampangans substantial role in the Spanish massacre of the Chinese. Other forms of indigenous earthenware and vessels of Spanish colonialism found in Parian illuminate the potential interactions the Chinese had with other ethnic groups through marriage and incorporation of Spanish and indigenous material culture.

=== Boxer Codex ===
Giving further insight into the effects of Spanish colonialism is the Boxer Codex. A manuscript containing illustrations of various ethnic groups in the Philippines, the Boxer codex can be perceived as a mechanism to justify Spanish colonialism in the Philippines and promote the propagation of a particular investment global trade network stretching across multiple nations. This codex also carries a particular symbolism in that its influences aren’t merely predicated on the authorship of the codex itself. Though it was crafted by the Spanish, this doesn’t necessarily mean that it is purely reflective of Spanish hegemonic colonialism. The codex itself is a synthesis of European, Chinese, and even potentially Tagalog traditions, all of which are representative of the colonial experience in Spanish Manila. It literally has both Spanish text and Chinese characters. The codex is symbolic of the cultural convergence that was present in Manila, evidence of particular hybridity that was present. There are two ways to observe hybridity in the archaeological record, the first being an object that is observed to have characteristics from multiple origins and the second being a particular assemblage of materials from different areas. The Boxer Codex is exemplary of the first form of hybridity, as the numerous influences shape one object, in this case, the manuscript itself.

=== Hybridity in Manila ===
Early Spanish colonial Manila was the perfect location for the process of multiethnic hybridization. The respective place of the Philippines as a center of trade in Island Southeast Asia combined with the Galleon and East and Southeast Asian trade route directions allowed for Manila to truly be a cultural hub. Also allowing this was the respective histories of each of the Spanish, Chinese, and Indigenous Filipinos prior to the conception of Manila as a capital city. There are further complexities in the midst of ethnic identity that are overlooked in scholarship, particularly that of the non-elite Spanish and the Chinese who were not converted to Christianity. This concept of hybridity does not equate that the diversity in ethnic backgrounds with equality and even similar circumstances. Hybridity is merely a lens to view cultural developments and human actions in the context of colonialism.

== Galleon trade system ==
The Manila-Acapulco Trade system was an important aspect in the Philippines that was in place for about 200 years between 1600-1800. This trade network connected China, Southeast Asia, Mexico (New Spain), and Europe. Many goods were passed from the East to the West and vice versa during this time period. One of the most prominent goods that were traded from east to west was porcelain trade ware produced in China.

=== Trade post locations ===
Both China and Southeast Asia were rich with exotic goods that were in high demand in European countries between 1600-1800. Those wealthy enough to afford foreign luxury goods from the East sought out products such as Chinese porcelain, silk, and spices. This demand for foreign luxury goods, such as porcelain, was what led to the development of the Manila-Acapulco Trade. The Manila-Acapulco Trade was a trade network in which goods from China traveled down to trading ports in Manila, that then moved from Manila to Acapulco, and finally traveled from Acapulco to Spain where the goods made their way throughout Europe all via Spanish trade ships. This connection between the East and the West is what fueled porcelain trade ware production in China because there was finally a way to transport the porcelain in high quantities from China to Europe.

=== Exotic goods on demand ===
Prior to this trade network, foreign luxury goods such as Chinese porcelain were hard to come by in Europe because it was hard to get porcelain to Europe. The demand was always high for these goods, and the Manila- Acapulco Trade was simply the key to satisfying it. With the high demand for porcelain in Europe, and the Manila-Acapulco Trade established as a way to transport high quantities of it, the production of trade ware in China sky-rocketed. The Chinese produced high quantities of porcelain to be sent to Europe via the Manila-Acapulco Trade, and in return, they received European silver. Thus, I could also argue that the Manila-Acapulco Trade system fueled higher production of porcelain trade ware in China because of the Chinese demand for European silver. With the Manila-Acapulco Trade system as a way to finally meet the high demands for silver in China, the porcelain trade ware production increased to have more to trade in exchange for silver.

The Manila-Acapulco Trade system served as a way to connect the East and the West in many ways. However, it mostly served as a way for the East to acquire silver from the West and for the West to acquire porcelain from the East. This new system of access between worlds is what made satisfying these demands a reality and as a result, porcelain trade wear production in China increased to meet these demands.

== Redefining narratives ==
Studies of colonial history often paint a narrative that is predicated on two myths. The first would be the Spanish establishment of trade networks and the second would be the passive victimization of those affected by colonialism. What the post-1500s archaeology of the Philippines manages to do is redefine those narratives. The pervasive narratives that paint the Spanish as a singular force with no resistance are fictional in nature, as pericolonial responses by the Ifugao and the hybridity seen in Manila depict. The Spanish did not establish the complex networks of trade but rather inserted themselves within a complex multicultural network that had already been established. The archaeological work done regarding the post-1500s Philippines works to craft a new narrative that departs from the colonial underpinnings of Philippine archaeology as a whole. Through giving a voice to those marginalized in historical contexts, the archaeology of the post-1500s Philippines redefines the history of the Philippines itself.
