= Emergence of agriculture in the Philippines =

The means by which agriculture expanded into the Philippines is argued by many different anthropologists and the exact date of its origin is unknown. However, there are proxy indicators and other pieces of evidence that allow anthropologists to get an idea of when different crops reached the Philippines and how they may have originated. Rice is an important agricultural crop today in the Philippines and many countries throughout the world import rice and other products from the Philippines.

== Factors that led to farming ==
Until the end of the Pleistocene, most people inhabiting the planet were hunter-gatherers. Between 8500 and 2500 AD, people transitioned to farming at different times and places around the world.

=== Climate change ===
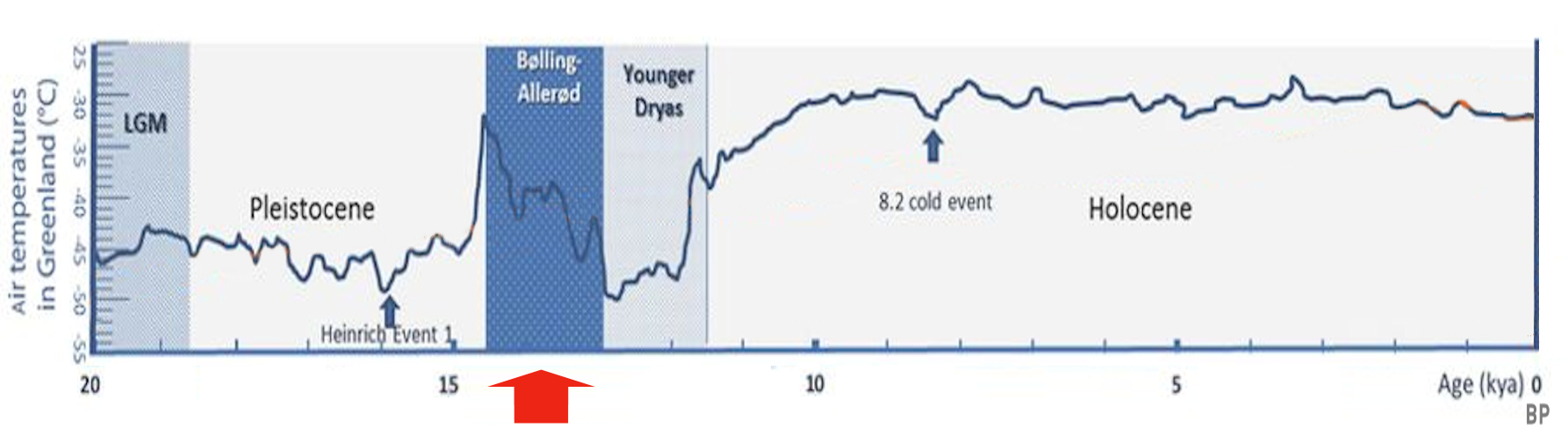
Chart indicating the change in temperature conditions after the Pleistocene

After 15,000 years ago, the post-glacial climate change at the end of the Pleistocene made the climate much warmer and more humid. This led to an increase in the productivity of the tropical layers of the earth. In addition, the climate change led to severe cold periods that were not conducive for hunter-gathering. Areas like China and the Levant, for example, began selecting for certain features in their crops that would allow them to persist through the sporadic cold periods.

=== Advantages of farming ===
Agricultural expansions were a result of several advantages that farming had over hunting and gathering. One advantage was that farming yielded more food per area of land meaning that farmers could grow enough food to support larger populations of people. Another advantage of the farming lifestyle is that it is largely sedentary, unlike the mobility of hunter-gathering. This allowed for surpluses to be stocked up in case of difficult growing periods to curb starvation. Lastly, the large and crowded farming societies brought about epidemic infectious diseases that farmers became resistant to. However, these diseases affected hunter-gatherers because they were not immune to them.

== Farming-language dispersal hypothesis ==
=== Austronesian language family ===
The Austronesian language family is a group of languages spoken throughout parts of Southeast Asia including Taiwan, Malaysia, and the Philippines. The history of this language family covers the time of Pre-Austronesian and the Austronesian. Pre-Austronesian speaking people were hunter-gatherers. They began in China then colonized Taiwan, then dispersed Southwards toward the Philippines and into Northern Indonesia. In an ethnolinguistic sense, Austronesian speaking people began 5,500 years ago in Taiwan and they were presumed to be farmers.

=== Bellwood and Renfrew's proposal ===
With the Austronesian language family and its dispersal in mind, Peter Bellwood and Colin Renfrew proposed one of the first ideas highlighting the origin of agriculture in Island Southeast Asia. Bellwood and Renfrew argued that, because of agriculture, the Austronesian speaking people migrated from their homeland in Taiwan to the Philippines and Indo-Malaysia then reached the Pacific after passing New Guinea. Proto-Austronesian, a reconstruction of the Austronesian languages, shows evidence of repetition in many of the same vocabulary terms for agriculture. The vocabulary is used as evidence for agriculture being the driving force behind the migration because it includes words like rice, millet, and pigs that are very similar across languages in Island Southeast Asia. It is believed that rice-based agriculture allowed Austronesian speaking people to migrate to regions inhabited by hunter-gatherers and populate the area or replace them to a degree. The approximate date of when Austronesian-speaking people began migrating from Taiwan to the Philippines is between ca. 4,500 to 4,000 years ago.

== Opposing views on the farming-language dispersal hypothesis ==
Despite the prevalence of Bellwood's farming-language dispersal hypothesis, different scholars have disagreed with the farming-language dispersal hypothesis and have put forward different possible factors to consider when thinking about the emergence of agriculture in ISEA (Island Southeast Asia).

=== Lack of archaeological evidence ===
Tim Denham, a university professor of anthropology, author, and research fellow, argued that there is not enough archaeological evidence to support the use of agriculture in ISEA before 3,000 years ago. Using multidisciplinary evidence, including the origin and spread of plant and animal domesticates in Island Southeast Asia, Denham proposed that East Asian crops are found in ISEA, but only after the period of Austronesian-speaking peoples' expansion. He argues for the lateness of the emergence of agriculture in Island Southeast Asia, including the Philippines, and further suggests that Indigenous peoples of Island Southeast Asia were active agents in the utilization of farming techniques during the mid-Holocene. In contrast to the idea that Indigenous peoples of ISEA were hunter-gatherers who were overthrown by farming societies, he claims that Indigenous peoples integrated new plants into former cultivation techniques, as well as adopted new strategies for animal domestication.

=== Population genetics ===
The application of population genetics and its relation to early migration in ISEA was proposed by Tim Denham and Mark Donohue. They disagree with the complete integration of the present hunter-gatherer groups of the region by the Austronesian-speaking migrants from Taiwan. They rebuke the idea of the Austronesian-speaking peoples possessing dominance because of their agricultural practices over their hunter-gatherer counterparts and instead propose integration from both the migrants and the present social groups into complex cultural groups. Evidence disagreeing with the Austronesian dominance of early people are presented in the DNA of ISEA populations. Only a fifth of the population could relate their genes to the out-of-Taiwan hypothesis suggesting that there was no absolute replacement of the preexisting groups of this area by migrants.

=== Neolithic expansion without farming practices ===
The idea that Neolithic expansion in Island Southeast Asia did not involve farming practices was described by Matthew Spriggs, an active voice in this archaeological topic. Material culture of this epoch such as the red-slipped pottery marks the fusion of different social groups including migrants from outside of these islands as well as individuals already situated in the area. Spriggs describes that "subsistence changes were not needed to change identities" showing that although changes did occur in this region it did not necessarily include farming practices.

Roger Blench, supports the idea of the agriculture failure of Austronesian migrants and suggests that migration expansion and cultural assimilation by religious practices was more prevalent rather than agricultural practices. He emphasizes the idea that complex societies did not have to involve sedentary farming practices and that hunting and foraging could have been the main provider for subsistence.

== Archaeological evidence ==
=== Old Kiyyangan Village ===
In an archaeological study conducted at Old Kiyyangan Village in Ifugao, archaeologists analyzed charred organic residue from two earthenware sherds were analyzed in order to evaluate when rice agriculture, as well as cooking rice, occurred in the Philippines. The results of the examination were that the earthenware sherds were not from rice pots used to cook rice, instead they were used for cooking starchy vegetables such as taro, yams, and more. It shows that during pre-colonial times, the Ifugao people used a wide range of food resources that did not include rice. They cultivated starchy vegetables and domesticated animals like pigs, water buffalo, and chicken. They most likely kept a relationship between neighboring communities to hunt in order to obtain their protein, while at the same time clearing land to grow their crops. These pieces of evidence support the idea that early people in Ifuago were able to thrive without rice agriculture or intensive agriculture in general up until the point of colonization when population densities heightened, suggesting a later model for the emergence of intensive agriculture.

=== Taro and rice ===
Stephen Acabado argues that taro preceded wet-rice agriculture in the Ifugao terraces and that taro is indigenous to the Philippine archipelago. Taro brings a different perspective to the emergence and spread of agriculture in that it moves away from the general idea that domestication occurred through a sequence of events that began with root vegetable cultivation and came to a peak with intensive wet-rice agriculture. Previous models about the emergence of agriculture in ISEA credit the Austronesian dispersal for the introduction of taro and rice in those regions. However, new evidence exhibits that taro has pan-Southeast Asian origins and can be traced much earlier than the spread of Austronesian-speaking peoples in the region of Luzon in the Philippines. If this evidence is approved and taro is shown to have been present much earlier, it changes the perspective on how agriculture spread.

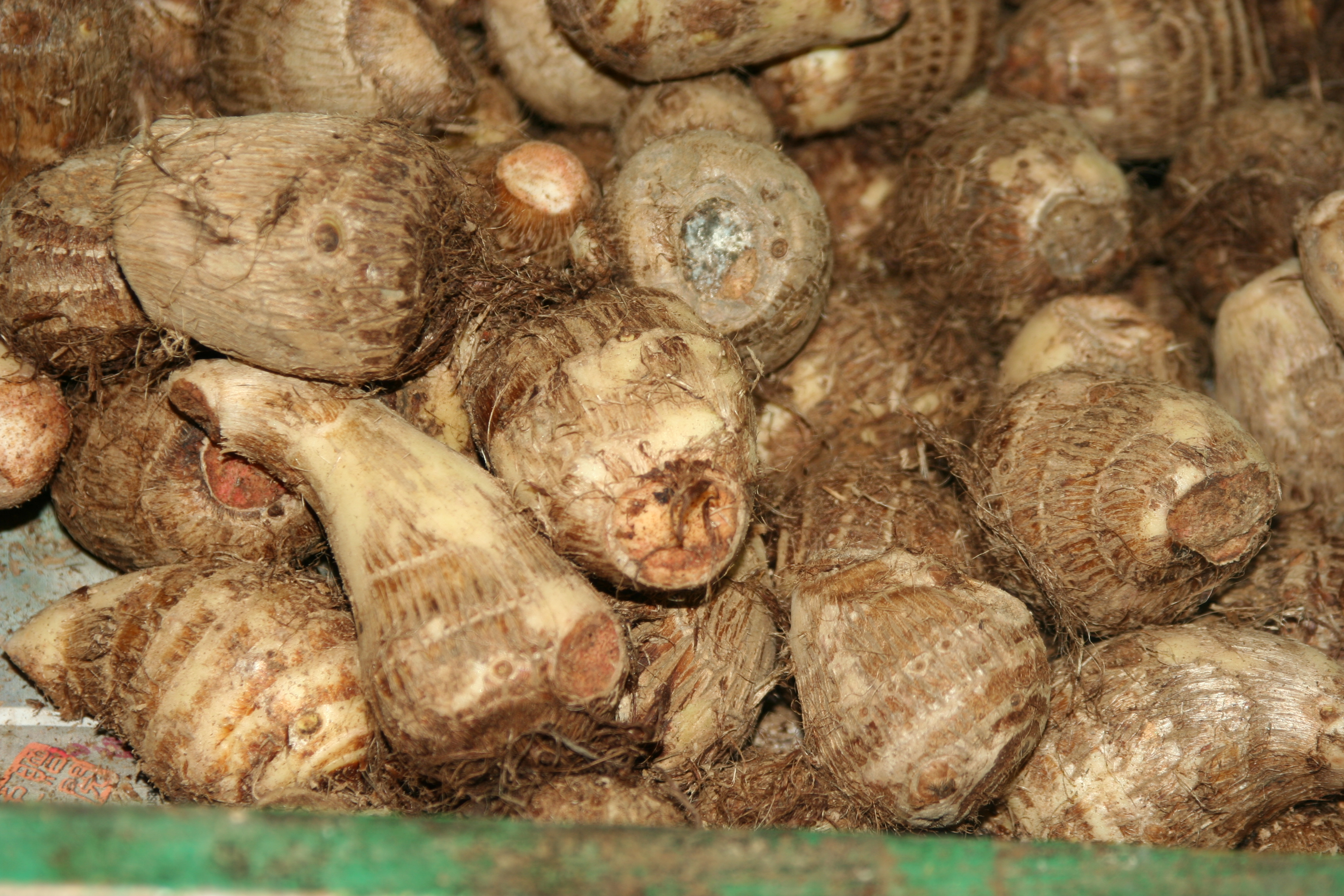
Taro roots

Anthropologist Martin Tsang found taro tissue in Cagayan dating between 3940 BC- 3379 BC suggesting that taro may have existed in the Philippines during a time that was much earlier than when taro agriculturalists began spreading to mainland Southeast Asia. The first evidence of rice found in the Philippines dates to between 2025 BC and 1432 BC. This taro-first model is only indirect evidence in favor of the cultivation of taro before the Austronesian-speaking people arrived in Southeast Asia and for the lateness of wet-rice agriculture in the Philippines and other parts of Island Southeast Asia.

The process of growing taro is not labor intensive and could have easily replaced rice as a main carbohydrate. Planting and farming Taro is a ceremonial process and has religious significance. In the Central Cordillera region, taro was a favored crop because of its low-population destiny. It is possible that there was not much population pressure in the Cordillera before the rise of colonialism and that taro and other root vegetables like sweet potato could have supported the populations present at the time. It is a possibility that as population density increased as a result of the Spanish arrival or after the arrival of lowland groups, there was a change to wet-rice agriculture.

=== Andarayan rice inclusion pottery ===
According to anthropologist Victor Paz, among the archaeological research done in the Philippines there has not been enough concrete evidence to point towards an early presence of rice agriculture. There is, however, archaeological evidence for the presence of rice remains in the Andarayan site located in northern Luzon which raises discussion on whether or not rice was cultivated at an earlier time than once thought.

Excavations have revealed carbonized rice inclusions such as rice husks and stems in earthenware. This discovery represents dry-rice cropping instead of the most common wet-rice agriculture seen in Luzon. Even with this archaeological find, the lack of rice samples make it difficult to attain a "comprehensive study". Tim Denham and Mark Donohue dismiss the idea that this evidence could be related to early intensive agriculture and instead conclude that the carbonized rice inclusions could be associated with foreign trade.

== Agriculture today ==
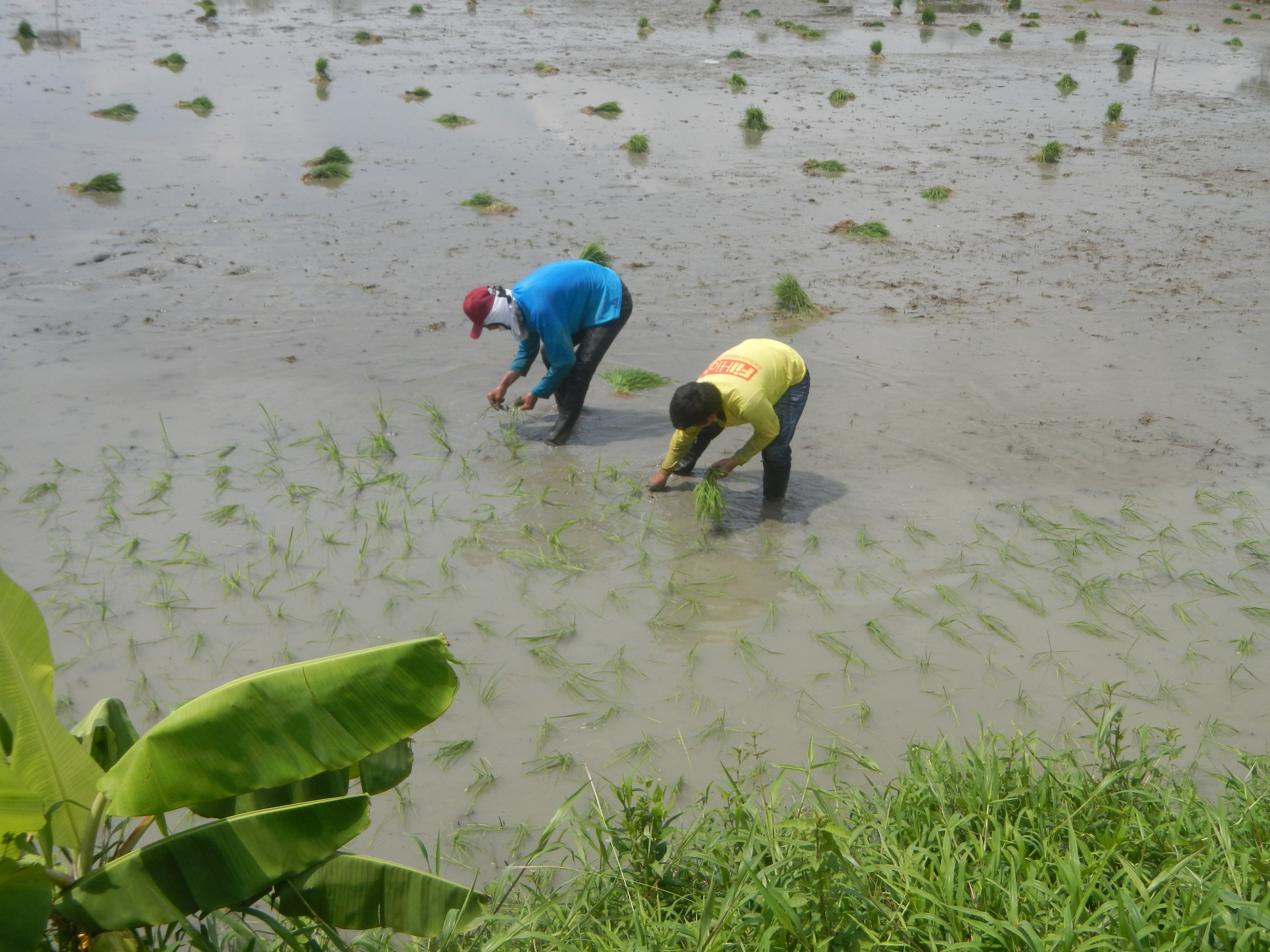
Present day rice cultivation in the Philippines

Currently, the Philippines remains the second-largest rice importer in the world. However, there is not much land left for rice agriculture and challenges to growing rice include unpredictable and unfavorable weather conditions as well as population density. A typhoon known as Yolanda that struck in 2013 damaged 2 percent of rice crops in the Philippines. Adverse weather conditions continue to threaten rice cultivation.

=== Cultural significance ===
Rice continues to hold important cultural value in the Philippines today. Folk legends about rice, including the story "Alamat ng Palay", depict how rice is cherished as a gift of life that keeps Filipinos grounded, healthy, and fed. In the past, rice was thought of as a prestige food and was only made in small quantities for spiritual rituals. Because of this, it is believed that rice was reserved for only the chiefs or elite members of the tribe and was a main factor in establishing social stratification and geographic differentiation. After the arrival of the Spanish and the plow technology they brought with them, agricultural development occurred and rice was being cultivated in larger volumes. Eventually, rice was no longer a prestige product or a seasonal offering, and instead was grown all year round and by the 19th century rice surpluses allowed for the product to be exported.

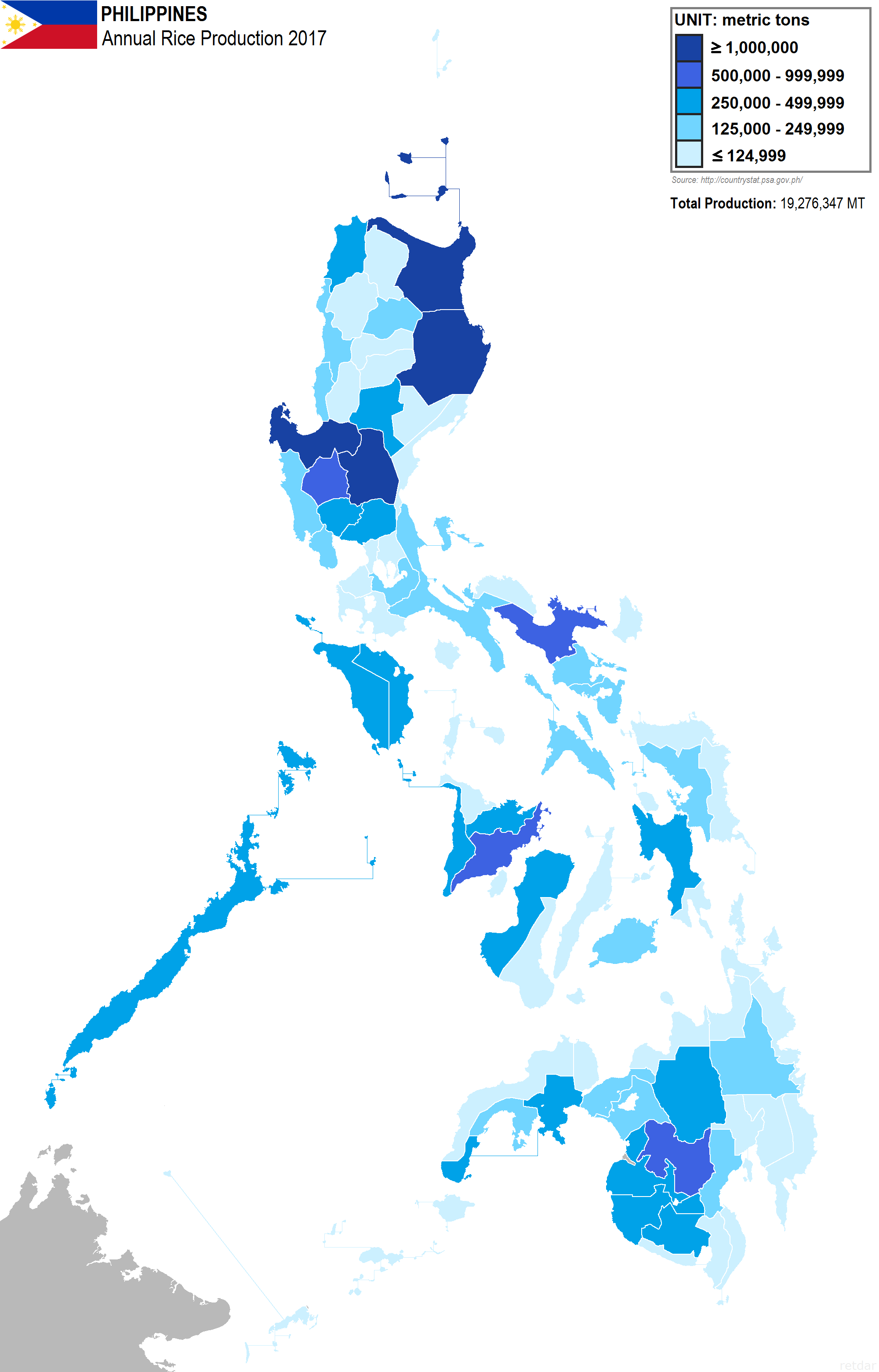
Rice production in the Philippines by region as of 2015
