= Openbaar Kunstbezit Vlaanderen =

Openbaar Kunstbezit Vlaanderen, abbreviated OKV, is a subsidised nonprofit organisation established to promote popular engagement with publicly owned art in the Flemish Region of Belgium. It publishes a magazine, six issues per year, about artists, artworks, and museums, under the title Openbaar Kunstbezit Vlaanderen, abbreviated OKV.

== History ==
First founded in 1963 as Openbaar Kunstbezit in Vlaanderen, it was folded into the Interprovinciale Cultuurraad voor Vlaanderen in 1976, but regained independent existence in 1985 under the leadership of Etienne De Cuyper. In the 1960s and 1970s it collaborated with the public-service broadcaster BRT (now VRT) in producing television programming on art.
