= Old Kiyyangan Village =

Archeological site in Ifugao, Philippines

- Location in Luzon Location in the Philippines
- 16°47′26″N 121°06′45″E
- Type: Settlement
- Cultures: Ifugao
- Location: Ifugao, Philippines
- Region: Cordillera

Old Kiyyangan Village (OKV) is an archeological site in the Lazo highlands in the province of Ifugao in the Cordillera Administrative Region of the Philippines. The importance of this site is the presence of the Ifugao people and culture as the first inhabitants in the valley, who also represent one of the major indigenous Filipino societies for rice cultivation. This site is surrounded by rice terraces used for agricultural practices and remain heavily debated as to when and how recent these terraces formed. Artifacts found at this site suggest a strong influence of Christianity, mortuary rituals, and a system that defined social status according to the accumulation of various beads and ceramics.

== Ifugao people and culture ==
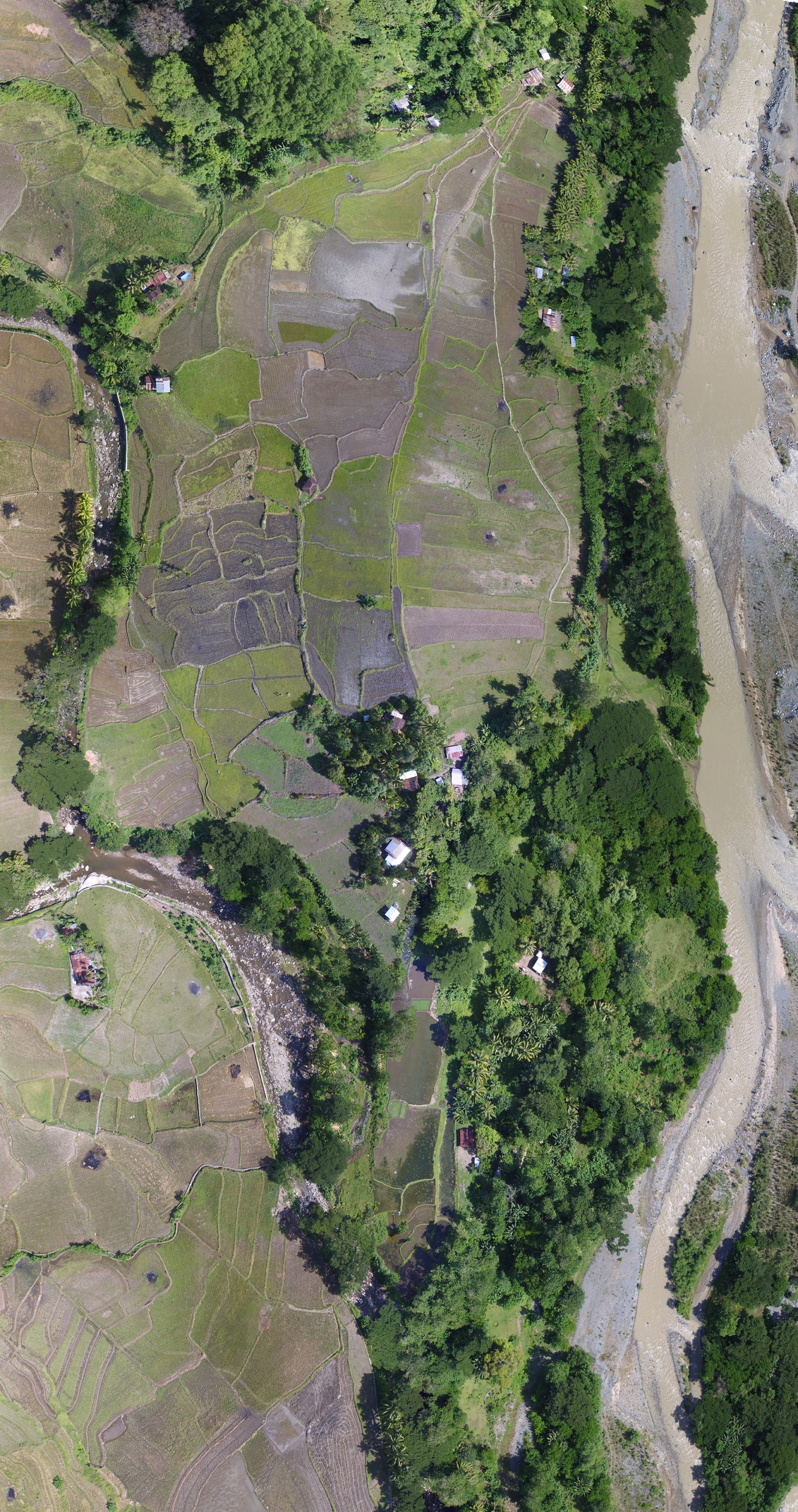
OKV Aerial

The Old Kiyyangan Village (OKV) dates back to as early as 810 Before Present (B.P) to 750 B.P. according to new research. This site is associated with the Ifugao culture and where the Ifugao Indigenous group presided for a few hundred years. The Ifugao Filipino Indigenous society are the main and only known community to occupy the Old Kiyyangan Village site from about 700 B.P. to 170 B.P. until the Spanish burned their land in 1832 AD during Spanish colonization. The Ifugao people are thought to have been one of the first Indigenous groups and rice cultivators of the Philippines, thus making them and their history an integral part to Filipino culture. As evident in various studies conducted at the Old Kiyyangan Village site and on the Ifugao people themselves, they were believed to have strong relationships with the dead, believed in several Deities with the Sun God as one of the main ones they worshipped, were a socially stratified and centralized society based on agricultural practices, and are known for being successfully resilient after Spanish colonization not only for maintaining the ability to preserve and develop their culture, but for establishing and developing a strong intra- and inter-regional trade of luxury items, trade ware, ceramics, and raw materials. The Ifugao are also the center of a highly contested debate defining the Ifugao that consequently defines the Ifugao and ancient Filipino culture as a whole, which is whether they created their rice terraces over two thousand years ago as first accounts suggest, or if they were created more recently. Though despite available comprehensive data and research, there is still very little information known about the site and Ifugao people during this time due to little funding in research projects, the extracted items being difficult to date, and disruptive colonial narratives of their origins.

== Religion ==
For research on the Ifugao and their religion, there have been a mix of accounts showing the Ifugao did not form a clear concept or system of moral teachings of the universe in a religious sense, but they did believe in a large variety of Deities, small specialized spirits, the presence of dead ancestors, as well as the universe being separated into five regions where all Deities and spirits resided: the Skyworld (Kabunian), the Underworld (Dalom), the Upstream Region (Daya), the Downstream Region (Lagud), and Earth (Pugao). Some of their most important deities include the Thunderer who lived in the Skyworld with his family and controlled weather patterns, and the Sun and Moon Gods who controlled untimely deaths such as men who died suddenly, and maternal and infant mortality rates; smaller deities include forest, ghost, or omen spirits that appear in the form of animals. The Deities were also split into categories such as nature gods who controlled weather and other natural events, culture gods who were believed to have taught the Ifugao certain skills (God of weaving, God of farming, etc.), and gods of reproduction for specifically rice cultivation due to rice being an integral social, religious, and political part of Ifugao culture. The Ifugao's relationship with their Deities was mainly fear-based worship and worked on a process of sacrificial rituals where the Ifugao would make specific offerings their Deities may want in order to keep their lives free of evil; they would perform similar actions with dead ancestors, but were less fearful of their ancestors and performed rituals and sacrifices in veneration to keep a close connection to them and to guarantee their peace on earth and in afterlife. The Ifugao also had evil spirits, where the most notorious were the Pinading that steal souls of the living, which the Ifugao could avoid if more offerings were made or divorce dowries were paid, and other higher or small, more limited spirits were sourced to the Ifugao's fevers, stomach pains, diseases, etc. Dreams were an essential part in the Ifugao's relationship to Deities and the process of deification where the Ifugao believed Deities could only speak to them in dreams through fear-filled images or predictions of what is to come, so the Ifugao often lived in fear and were scared of powerful, external spirits. The dependence on dreams and divine communication was important during Spanish colonization because this led the Ifugao to distrust and not believe that the Spanish were Godly creatures because the Ifugao did not see the colonizers in their dreams, therefore could not have any connection to the Ifugao's Deities.

=== Burial orientation ===
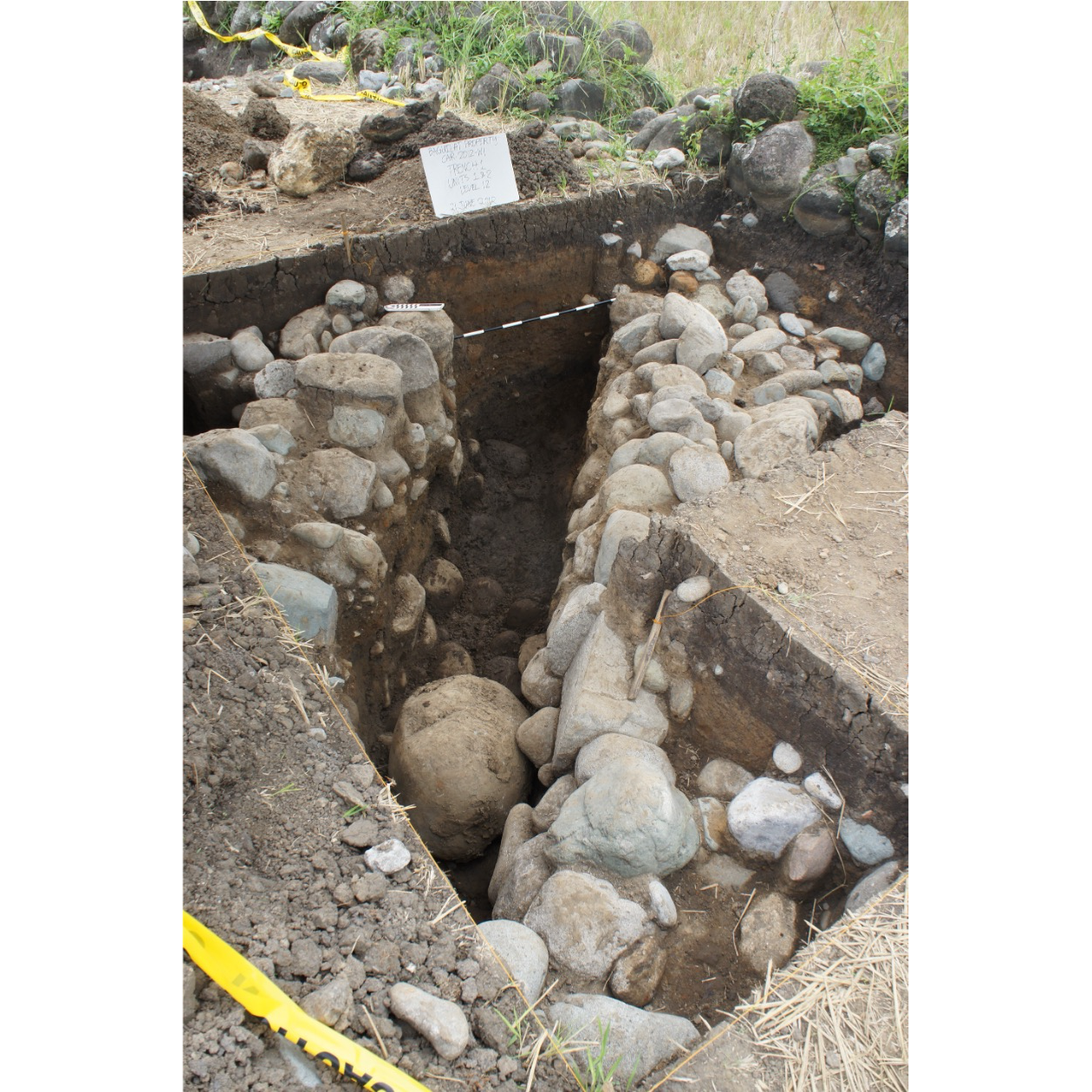
OKV Excavation 1

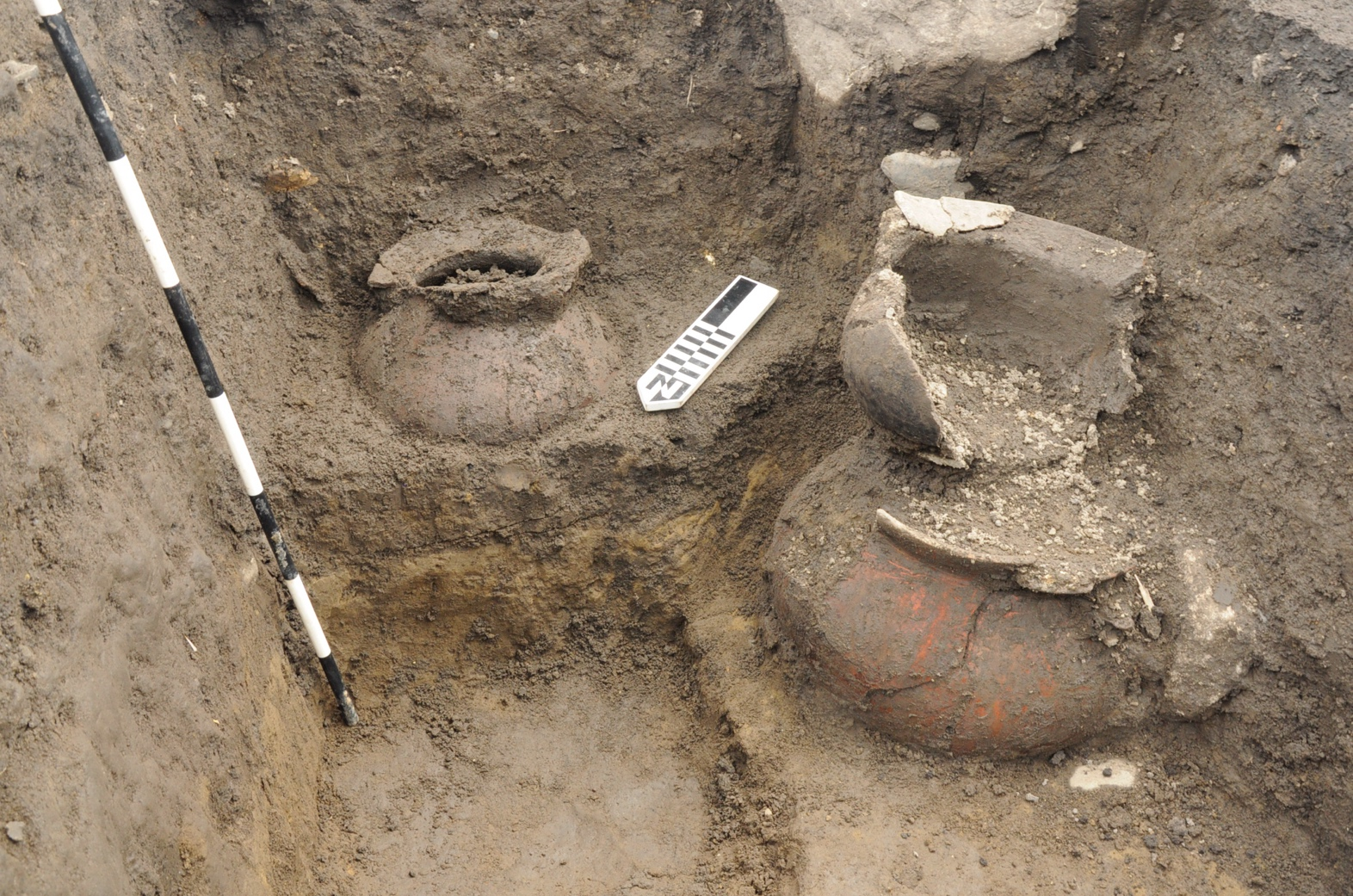
OKV Excavation 2

Burial orientation is one of the significant factors in the way that funerary practices were upheld for multiple generations at this site. The research conducted at the OKV concluded that the orientation of burials was found to have religious affiliations relating to influences of Christianity by Spanish colonizers. The burials that existed before Spanish colonizers arrived tended to contrast with what burials looked like after. The orientation of the burials facing east to west or north to south are significantly in sync with the orientation of homes. Additional findings across six different burials suggest that the inhabitants at this site relied on the celestial alignment with the sun in their mortuary practices as well. The varying directions in which some burials face may also be because of the way that the sun would set and rise across the village throughout the seasons. In addition to the orientation of burials discovered, there are also multiple types of burials that are usually found in the Philippines including jar and coffin burials, unenclosed pits, stone graves, and the option of cremation which was introduced later on. Infant burials followed along with these same patterns of house orientation pointing to a strong terrestrial or cosmological meaning. This evidence as well as an oral historical account of an Ifugao soldier buried facing his enemy's home so in his death he can haunt his murderer, support the study's conclusion that Ifugao buried infants on an east–west axis to face the setting sun to guide them to the Underworld. Though this burial ritual changed to a west–east axis after Spanish colonization because Christian teachings believed the dead should face the rising sun in order to be reborn in a new life.

==== Steps of funerary practices ====
These traditions start with washing the members who become deceased for purity, followed by dressing and wrapping their bodies in cloth materials or textiles, and including any of the individual's personal possessions like ceramics, glass or stone beads upon the grave. After the burial process begins the period of mourning which can vary having a role in the social status of such members. The grave is placed under a newly constructed protection which may consist of roofs or fences filled with offerings from the community such as food.

=== Beliefs in the afterlife ===
Remembrance and respectful relationships with the dead are a major custom and daily practice to the Ifugao culture. A study conducted by the Ifugao Archaeological Project (IAP) researched sixteen trenches of neonate burials where children were typically buried directly underneath homes. The IAP found several ornaments and grave goods set within the strata as well as on top of the strata, indicating that families in these homes interacted with the dead as an everyday ritual for veneration. The study concluded children were buried under homes not just because they were less valued than adults, but were buried there in order for their spirits to be integrated into the family, culture, and community. This was in part due to homes symbolizing a connection between the living and the dead as understood through the land in the Ifugao culture. Another reason for children being buried underneath homes was for families to cope with the increased infant mortality rates during this period. The study proved how important the treatment of ancestors through respectful interactions everyday was vital to the Ifugao people.

== Social structure ==
There is evidence to suggest that the Ifugao people did have a social hierarchy based on kinship ties and agriculture, in contrast to other Filipino polities during this period that were more commonly hierarchical chiefdoms. Evidence was found at this site to establish social status was determined by the beads that were found in many of the infant burials. The goods that were discovered in these burials consisted of either utilitarian or luxury goods. The concept of a kinship-based society is supported by the documented trade between lowland communities leading to the way society maintained organized in the OKV. Stone beads found in the excavations at this site imply that the more stone beads that were found in the burials, the more wealthy that person was among other villagers. The absence of these stone beads may be because of how valuable and unattainable they were by many inhabitants. The prevalence of glass beads that were excavated at this site among various burials suggests that these were more common among the average member of the OKV, relating to the social status of men, women, and children. Most stone beads excavated were agate or carnelian and not local to the Philippines, thus were highly culturally valued for being "foreign," and were found in drastically smaller quantities than glass beads, indicating that glass beads were more common and for poorer families. An IAP study concluded that because trenches harbored stone beads and others did not, that stone beads were significantly rarer than other bead types, and that stone beads were major indicators of wealth and status, that this is enough evidence to support social stratification.

Research conducted by Stephen Acabado indicates that the Ifugao's complex agricultural and irrigation system contributed to their social structure that led to them having more centralized power rather than a chiefdom or kingdom. He explains how the physical intensity of rice cultivation in the terraces led to needing a more cooperative working and lifestyle for the Ifugao, arguing that their agricultural system actually became the basis of how they socialized and structured themselves. A study initially searching for the when, why, and how rice was cultivated at OKV, also found that rice tremendously affected social stratification in Ifugao society where rice landholdings and the type of rice grown were indicators of a wealthy or poor family; dry land rice cultivation was found to be used by poorer families, and families with large rice landholdings used wet rice cultivation and had a greater ability to provide large feasts. More research by Acabado also found the massive rice terraces to have been built within a two-to-three hundred-year period, suggesting the Ifugao had already established a complex socio-political structure.

== Agriculture ==
=== Rice cultivation ===
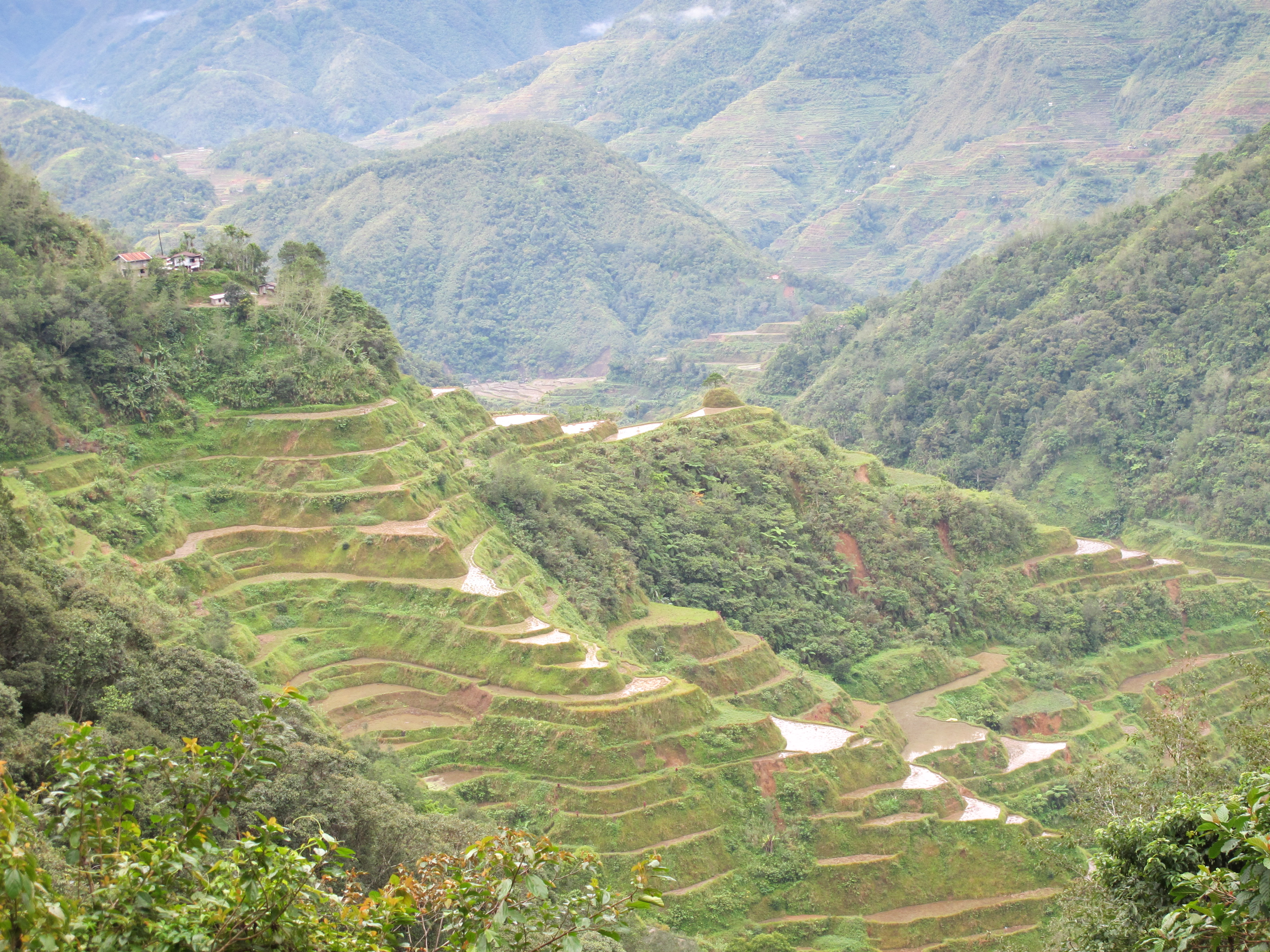
Ifugao rice terraces.

The time of rice cultivation for the Ifugao people has been the center of a largely contested debate that consequently defines the Ifugao culture, deciding whether the rice terraces are actually over two thousand years old as first accounts argue from Western sources, or were made more recently as argued by local sources. A study as mentioned before conducted research on if rice cultivation existed during the Ifugao's occupation of OKV, when it began, how it began, what methods were used, and what symbol may rice have represented in their culture. The study analyzed presence of pollen, phytolith, and starch in the terraces, concluding that rice was present during the Ifugao's occupation of the site and was cultivated around 810-750 cal. B.P. (supporting the argument that the terraces were made more recently than two thousand years ago). During research, there was also debate on how rice cultivation came to the Cordillera Province because evidence of dry land rice was found at the Andarayan site somewhat near the Ifugao, yet pollen evidence found at OKV indicated a wet rice cultivation, the soil and weather patterns were better suited for wet rice, and ethnolinguistic analyses found that the Ifugao had their own terms for rice as well that were only developed within the Cordillera region. However, more evidence at OKV also suggested dry land rice practices, leading an assumption that the Ifugao learned dry land rice methods over time from neighboring societies. Research conducted by Acabado that worked on dating these terraces also support that the Ifugao created them more recently and in response to the Spanish Empire.

Health status and diets of the villagers were affected by the Spanish colonization as discovered through the change in substance practices by paleoethnobotanical data. As taro originated in the rice terraces of the OKV, rice eventually became the main source of food as the population intensified with communication between highland and lowland communities working together upon the invasion of Spaniards. This switch to rice was compared to the previous food sources of taro along with sweet potato to evaluate the nutritional quality of food in terms of serving new members of the village appropriately to the newly adopted agricultural practices. It was apparent that low class communities opted for swidden farming and higher class communities practiced wet-terraced farming. Rice proved to be a more valuable food source to support a growing village, which further provides evidence for the shift to rice.

== Trade and economics ==
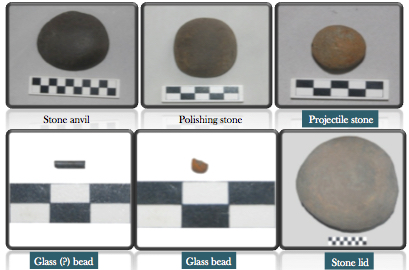
OKV Artifacts

Before and after Spanish colonization, the Ifugao people surprisingly flourished in an unexpected rise in economic intensification and position in regional and global trade. Due to local and Indigenous history being erased and overshadowed by colonization and the cosmopolitan history of urban Manila, several researchers and archaeologists have attempted to seek out answers to how the Ifugao became economically, socially, and culturally successful after Spanish colonization, and to analyze and present this to the public in a way that puts Indigenous voices at the forefront of their findings and conclusions. One study conducted analyzed various trenches across OKV observing the existence of trade ware due to this being an important tool indicating wealth, trade access and influence, and cultural practices where stoneware and ceramics were specifically studied for being non local materials and indicators of trade activity. The trade goods were dated between the 1200s and 1800s where rarer, more valuable stoneware and ceramics were found to increase over time, indicating that despite Spanish colonizers increasing economic intensification in surrounding regions of the Philippines, the Ifugao did not succumb and fall behind to foreign wealth and power, but re-situated themselves in the Lazo highlands from Spain's direct control and continued preserving and developing their own culture and increasing their own economic intensification through establishing separate trade networks. There is, however, little information found on exactly who the Ifugao traded with, but some excavated trade ware and prestige goods suggest they were trading inter- and intra-regionally. But nonetheless, due to the Ifugao's success in economic intensification and building an extensive trade network, this positioned them as one of the foundational pieces in establishing the Philippines as a major trading hub on the global scale for Southeast Asia.

== Significance ==
The Old Kiyyangan Village is significant in regards to the history of the Philippines in the opposition to Spanish colonialism to continue the practices of the Ifugao culture and maintain the use of rice terraces for generations to be built upon in strengthening the community. As the site where research is conducted heavily in the Philippines, the OKV and the culture that exists today is ever changing due to the decolonization practices being done by local researchers and the Ifugao Archaeological Project. With educating and engaging with the people who inhabit this area today, researchers are working to enhance the identity that Ifugao people perceive themselves as through learning about the stories of their history through the excavations across the valley that reveal what daily life looked like for the previous inhabitants.
