= Banaue Rice Terraces =

Rice terraces in Ifugao, the Philippines

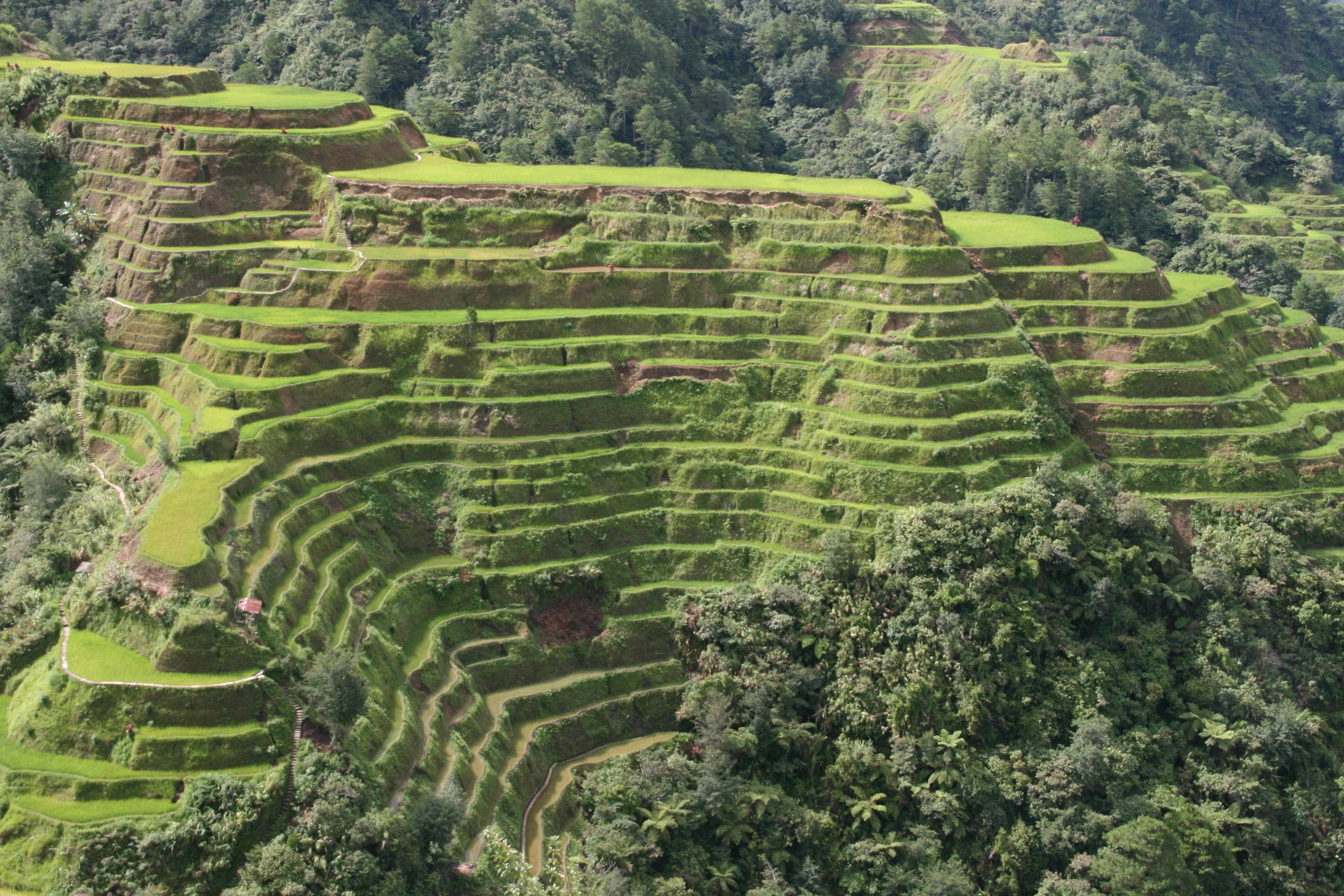
- The Banaue Rice Terraces of Ifugao

- Location within Luzon Location within Philippines
- Location: Ifugao, Philippines
- Coordinates: 16°54′N 121°3′E

The Banaue Rice Terraces (Filipino: Hagdan-hagdang Palayan ng Banawe) [bɐˈnawe] are terraces that were carved into the mountains of Banaue, Ifugao, in the Philippines, by the ancestors of the Igorot people. The terraces were built with minimal equipment, largely by hand. The terraces are located approximately 1,500 meters (4,900 feet) above sea level. These are fed by an ancient irrigation system from the rainforests above the terraces.

Locals up to this day still plant rice and vegetables on the terraces, although conservationists have begun arguing that these are no longer “real” rice terraces due to increasingly higher incidence of planting vegetables in lieu of rice. More and more younger Ifugaos do not find farming appealing, often opting for the more lucrative hospitality industry generated by the terraces. The result is the gradual erosion of the characteristic "steps", which require constant reconstruction and care. In 2010, a further problem encountered was drought, with the terraces drying up completely in March of that year.

Anthropologist Otley Beyer has estimated that the terraces are over 2000 years old, but several researchers dispute this and contend that they were built much later. Nevertheless, rice is an ancient ancestral crop of the Philippines, having been carried by Austronesian migrations into the islands since at least 1500 BCE (3500 years ago).

Current threats to the terraces include the giant earthworms ("olang" in Ifugao) of the genus Pheretima or Polypheretima elongata which are blamed for causing damage to the terraces, as well as rodents of the genus Chrotomys and snails.

== Cultural significance ==
=== Ifugao rice culture ===
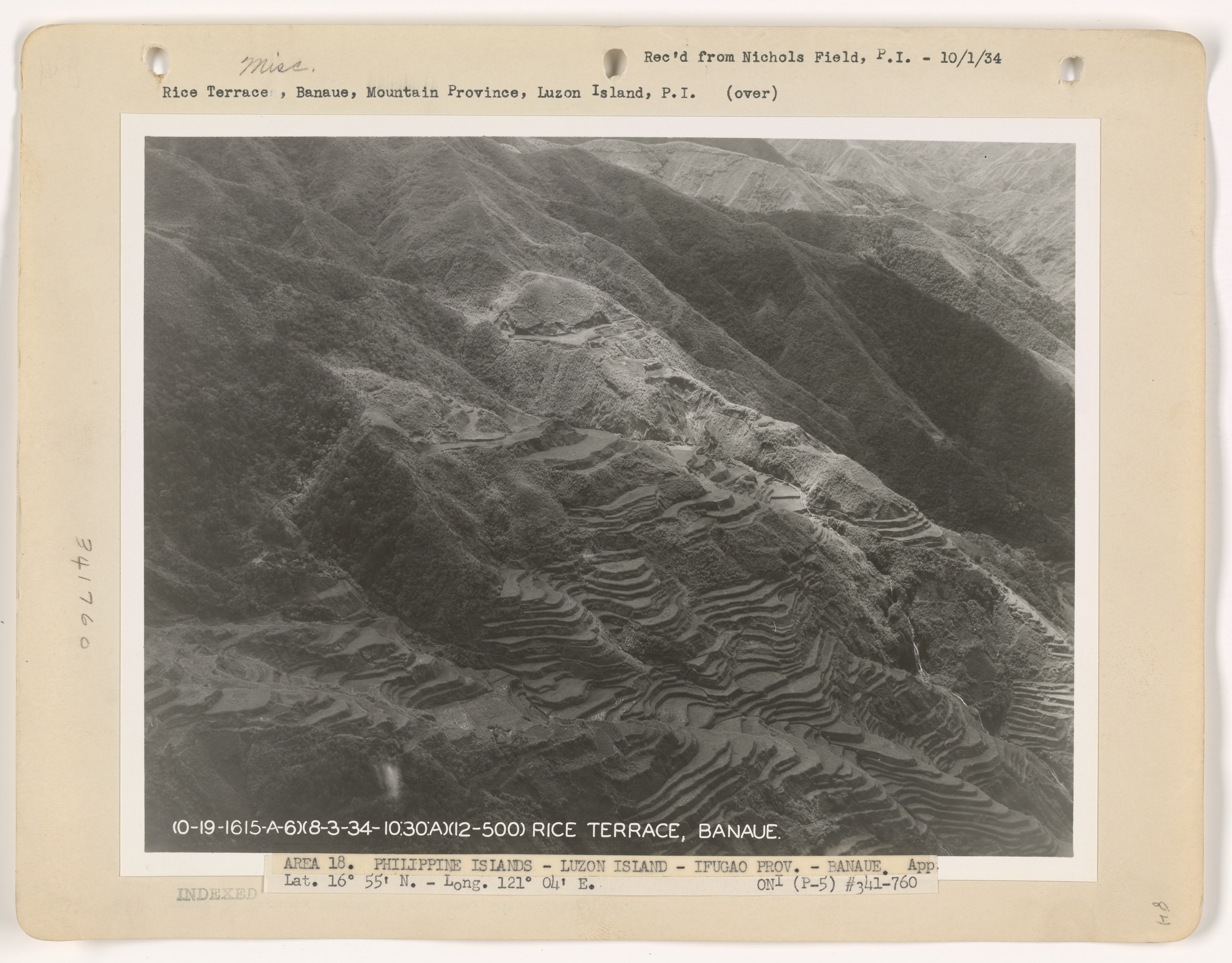
Aerial view of Banaue Rice Terraces, circa 1930s

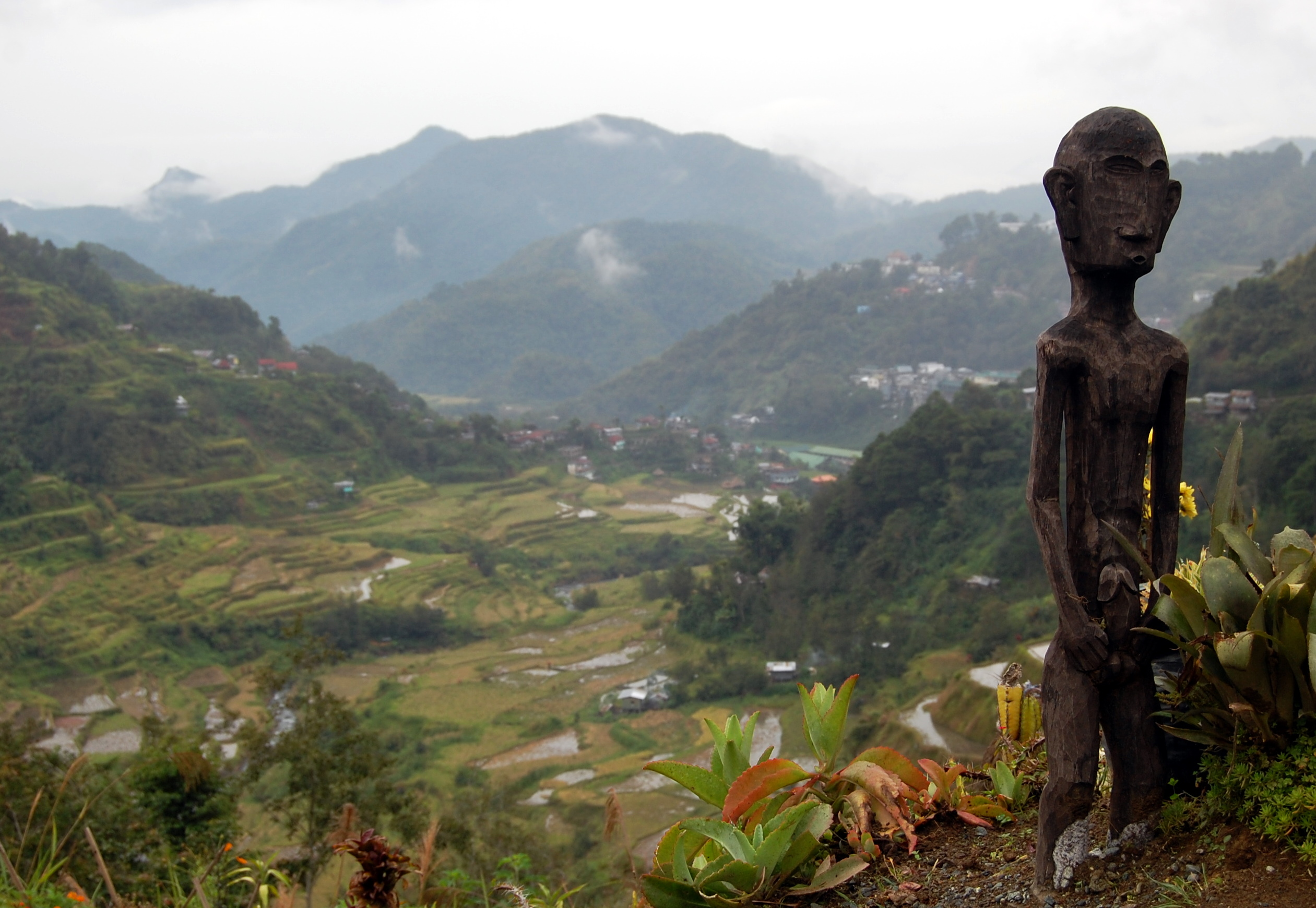
An Ifugao hogang, guardian spirits carved from tree fern trunks usually placed along pathways and in village outskirts

The terraces are found in the province of Ifugao and the Ifugao people have been its caretakers. Ifugao culture revolves around rice, the Black Rice kalinayan, and the culture engenders an elaborate array of celebrations linked with agricultural rites from rice cultivation to rice consumption. The harvest season generally calls for thanksgiving feasts, while the concluding harvest with rites called tango or tungul (a day of rest) which entail a strict taboo on any agricultural work. Bayah (rice wine), rice cakes, and betel nut are also consumed as part of the festivities.

The Ifugao people practice traditional farming spending most of their labour at their terraces and forest lands while occasionally tending to root crop cultivation. The Ifugaos have also been known to culture edible shells, fruit trees, and other vegetables which have been exhibited among Ifugaos for generations. The difficulty of planting kalinayan and other rice varieties with the soil type in these areas leads to the building of the rice terraces entailing construction of retaining walls with stones and rammed earth which are designed to draw water from a main irrigation canal above the terrace clusters. Indigenous rice terracing technologies have been identified with the Ifugao's rice terraces such as their knowledge of water irrigation, stonework, earthwork and terrace maintenance. As their source of life and art, the rice terraces have sustained and shaped the lives of the community members.

=== Organic farming ===
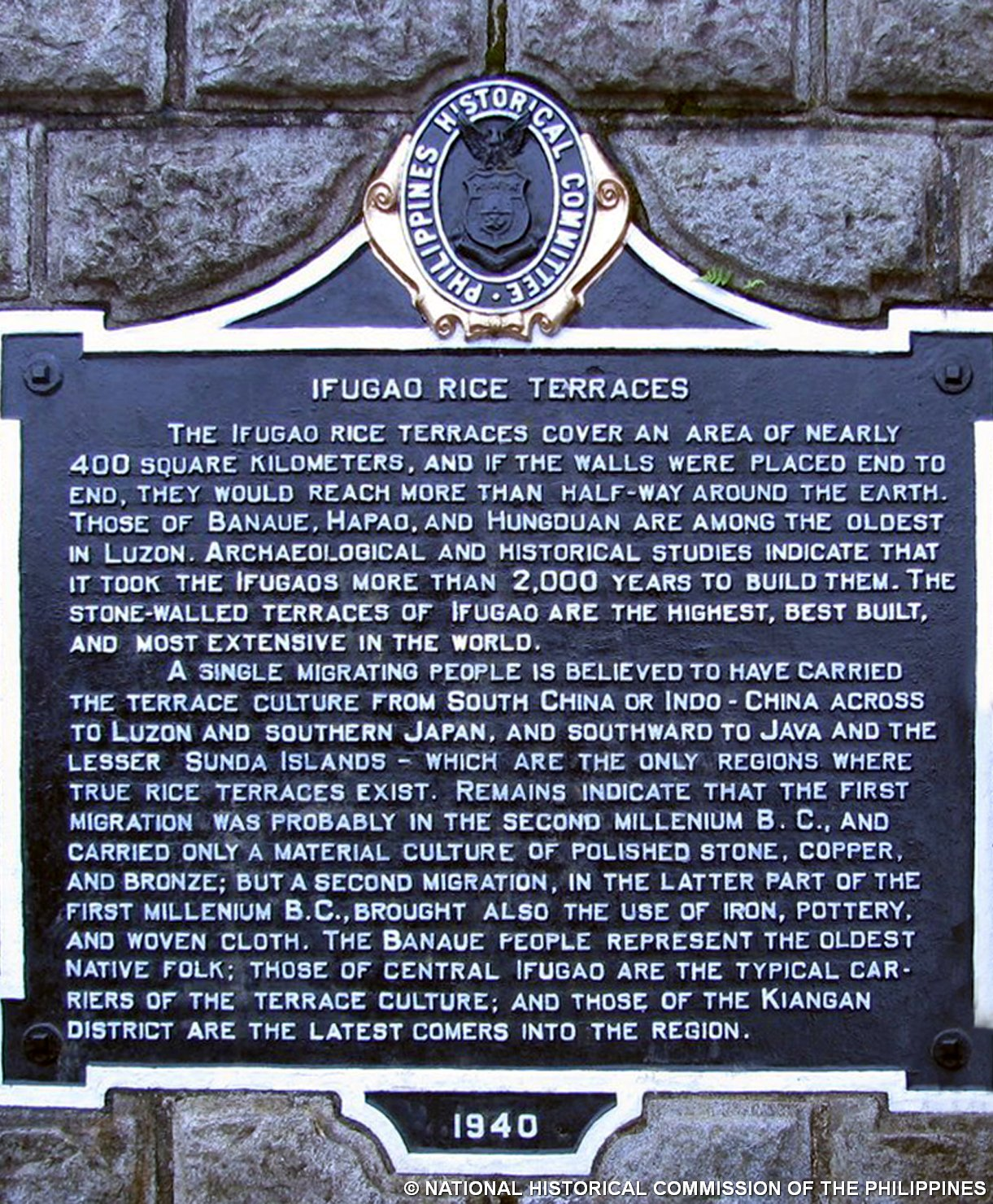
National historical marker installed in Banaue in 1940

In March 2009 the Ifugao rice terraces were declared free from genetically modified organisms (GMO). An event declaring this achievement was organized in Dianara Viewpoint in collaboration with local and municipal government, Greenpeace, and the Miss Earth Foundation.

=== Official heritage designation ===
The Banaue Rice Terraces refer to the cluster close to the Banaue poblacion as seen from the viewpoint. Contrary to popular belief perpetrated by its inclusion on the twenty peso banknote, the Banaue Rice Terraces are not a UNESCO World Heritage Site. They were not included in the UNESCO inscription Rice Terraces of the Philippine Cordilleras due to the presence of numerous modern structures, making it score low in the integrity criterion of UNESCO.

The five clusters inscribed as part of the Rice Terraces of the Philippine Cordilleras are Batad, Bangaan, Hungduan, Mayoyao Central and Nagacadan. Batad and Bangaan are under the jurisdiction of the Municipality of Banaue but are not called the Banaue Rice Terraces.

The Banaue Rice Terraces were declared by the Philippine government as a National Cultural Treasure under Ifugao Rice Terraces through Presidential Decree No. 260 signed by President Ferdinand Marcos in 1973.

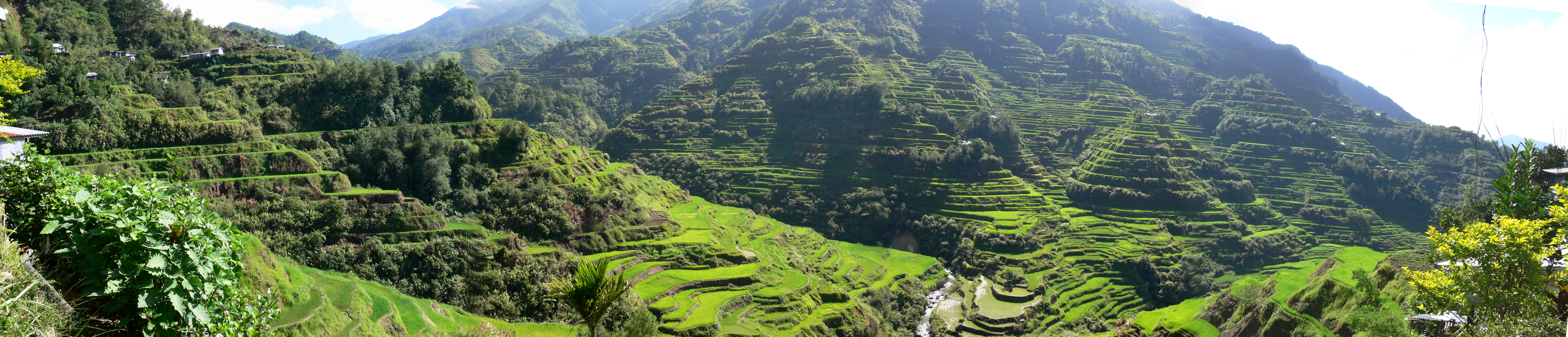
Panoramic view of the Banaue Rice Terraces.

== Tourism ==
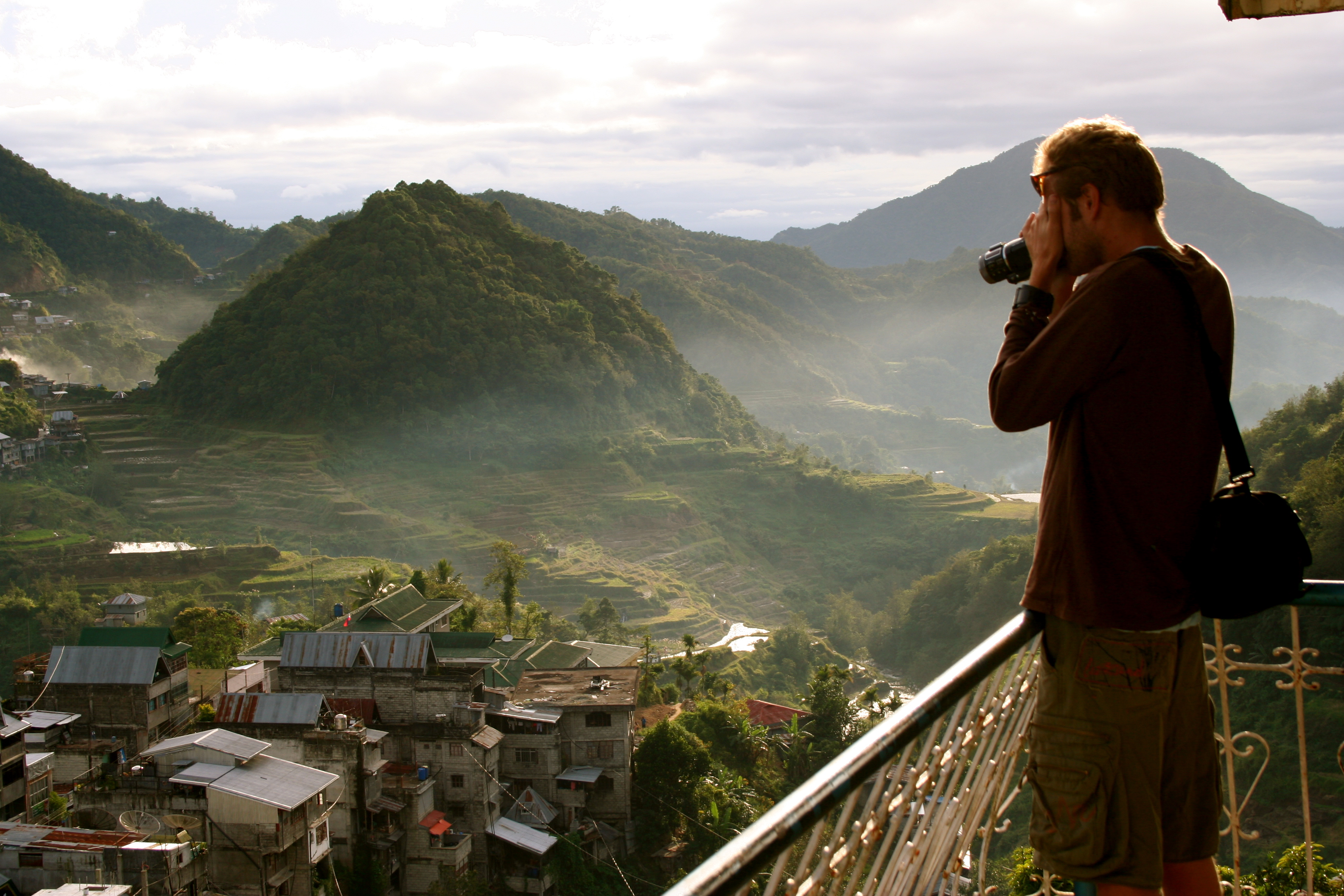
A tourist taking a photograph of the rice terraces.

Another thriving economy in the Banaue Rice Terraces is tourism. The tourism industry has developed a number of activities for visitors which may include traditional sightseeing of the terraces and visits to the tribes at the foot of the terraces. A Mumbaki (traditional Ifugao witch doctor) is also marketed to visitors: these doctors can perform spiritual healing rituals. Domestic tourism however has gone down over the past few years.

The park is featured on the reverse side of the New Design series one thousand peso note that was circulated from December 16, 1991, to January 3, 2018, as well as the reverse side of the New Generation Currency twenty peso note printed from its initial printing batch in November 2010 to 2023.

== Other notable rice terraces in Ifugao ==
Aside from the Banaue Rice terraces there are 4 other similar terraces: the Batad Rice Terraces, Mayoyao Rice Terraces, Hapao Rice Terraces, and Kiangan Rice Terraces. Soil types in this mountainous province are similar to that used to fabricate clay pots or clay jars (also used in construction by firing clay). The Batad Rice Terraces are located in Barangay Batad in Banaue, these terraces resemble an amphitheatre. The Mayoyao Rice Terraces are for a rice variety called "tinawon", a rare type of organic rice which is grown in red and white varieties in these terraces. The Hapao Rice Terraces are located in Hungduan and are stone-walled from Sagada rock formation and date back to 650 AD. The Kiangan Rice Terraces are in Kiangan, on which are grown the rice varieties of nagacadan and julungan.

== See also ==
- Rice Terraces of the Philippine Cordilleras
- Tourism in the Philippines
