= List of barangays in Ifugao =

The Philippine province of Ifugao has 176 barangays comprising its 11 municipalities.

== Barangays ==
Most populous in its respective municipality (as of 2010)

Barangay	Population					Municipality
Barangay	2010	2007	2000	1995	1990	Municipality
Abatan	849	832	757	737	627	Hungduan
Abinuan	518	504	510	637	454	Lagawe
Aduyongan	399	614	528	652	957	Mayoyao
Ahin	1,065	975	707	988	895	Tinoc
Alimit	453	563	561	376	1,008	Mayoyao
Ambabag	837	654	678	727	621	Kiangan
Ambasa	740	714	506	671	488	Lamut
Amduntog	2,124	2,294	1,866	1,075	–	Asipulo
Amganad	1,826	1,740	1,699	1,540	1,451	Banaue
Anaba	632	627	547	573	523	Banaue
Anao	422	425	348	450	403	Hingyon
Antipolo	1,270	1,078	1,144	1,052	–	Asipulo
Ap-apid	997	782	621	585	477	Tinoc
Awayan	1,264	1,204	1,082	762	1,094	Aguinaldo
Ayangan	502	544	502	505	1,041	Mayoyao
Ba-ang	935	885	808	1,002	–	Hungduan
Baguinge	2,217	2,292	1,924	2,025	1,435	Kiangan
Balangbang	1,315	1,266	956	897	1,291	Mayoyao
Balawis	1,018	1,014	880	1,080	869	Banaue
Banao	599	604	636	548	588	Banaue
Banao	485	465	502	540	817	Mayoyao
Banga	113	144	110	116	119	Lagawe
Bangaan	746	714	705	687	649	Banaue
Bangar	461	314	272	277	246	Alfonso Lista (Potia)
Bangbang	832	700	735	754	689	Hungduan
Bangtinon	298	304	308	264	262	Hingyon
Banhal	669	641	551	572	837	Mayoyao
Batad	1,024	1,068	1,150	1,282	1,110	Banaue
Bato-Alatbang	768	716	689	670	–	Mayoyao
Bimpal	1,330	1,363	1,134	850	737	Lamut
Binablayan	1,478	1,369	1,296	1,156	1,195	Tinoc
Bitu	515	478	346	304	261	Hingyon
Bocos	2,820	2,673	2,248	2,398	1,822	Banaue
Bokiawan	1,366	1,155	1,070	956	829	Hungduan
Bokiawan	431	389	470	395	540	Kiangan
Boliwong	1,522	1,521	1,259	1,197	1,027	Lagawe
Bolog	1,528	1,356	1,341	1,155	743	Kiangan
Bongan	608	588	508	537	1,240	Mayoyao
Bunhian	1,013	969	930	653	1,176	Aguinaldo
Buninan	777	719	600	624	935	Mayoyao
Burnay	1,016	961	927	873	720	Lagawe
Busilac	1,422	1,249	1,059	853	990	Alfonso Lista (Potia)
Butac	1,179	1,173	1,062	857	2,382	Aguinaldo
Buwag	414	437	449	379	–	Aguinaldo
Buyabuyan	430	434	463	477	411	Lagawe
Caba	871	846	742	640	586	Lagawe
Cababuyan	738	672	706	–	–	Hingyon
Calimag	623	604	505	535	460	Alfonso Lista (Potia)
Calupaan	798	769	691	554	492	Alfonso Lista (Potia)
Camandag	3,860	3,294	2,979	2,235	–	Asipulo
Cambulo	1,219	1,155	1,229	1,294	1,528	Banaue
Caragasan	1,595	1,402	1,051	809	755	Alfonso Lista (Potia)
Cawayan	1,287	1,114	1,223	1,205	–	Asipulo
Chalalo	1,363	1,307	1,264	1,051	1,557	Aguinaldo
Chaya	870	799	672	516	1,305	Mayoyao
Chumang	977	931	701	506	914	Mayoyao
Cudog	1,514	1,500	1,231	1,033	767	Lagawe
Dalligan	241	349	260	272	292	Kiangan
Damag	986	993	1,030	760	1,160	Aguinaldo
Danggo	1,273	1,107	470	541	469	Tinoc
Dolowog	604	485	424	444	342	Alfonso Lista (Potia)
Ducligan	1,040	1,079	910	1,002	862	Banaue
Duit	2,064	2,057	1,657	1,427	1,072	Kiangan
Dulao	671	614	438	554	279	Lagawe
Eheb	469	459	372	367	328	Tinoc
Epeng	442	465	399	409	–	Mayoyao
Galonogon	1,137	1,111	1,115	798	1,500	Aguinaldo
Gohang	886	716	686	616	463	Banaue
Guinihon	457	527	414	419	939	Mayoyao
Gumhang	984	846	764	735	507	Tinoc
Halag	1,788	1,706	1,882	1,507	2,177	Aguinaldo
Hallap	1,048	1,013	914	703	–	Asipulo
Hapao	2,138	2,218	2,026	2,230	1,975	Hungduan
Hapid	1,504	1,341	1,226	1,338	1,060	Lamut
Holowon	738	689	562	522	453	Lamut
Hucab	1,396	1,277	1,174	1,021	876	Kiangan
Impugong	1,318	1,011	904	843	644	Tinoc
Inwaloy	436	333	300	381	1,447	Mayoyao
Itab	1,125	951	895	579	2,245	Aguinaldo
Jacmal	853	765	604	347	751	Aguinaldo
Jucbong	455	353	388	433	343	Lagawe
Julongan	457	494	410	468	864	Kiangan
Kiling	1,567	1,546	1,175	866	751	Alfonso Lista (Potia)
Kinakin	1,084	837	1,140	1,351	1,100	Banaue
Langayan	516	506	500	350	648	Mayoyao
Lawig	1,458	1,397	1,181	1,048	920	Lamut
Laya	706	631	439	390	–	Alfonso Lista (Potia)
Lingay	372	366	415	441	387	Kiangan
Little Tadian	1,216	881	829	622	422	Alfonso Lista (Potia)
Liwo	421	411	311	523	743	Mayoyao
Lubo-ong	775	966	781	821	534	Hungduan
Lucban	870	686	646	550	482	Lamut
Luhong	1,328	1,100	912	894	775	Tinoc
Luta	233	217	173	223	194	Lagawe
Mabatobato (Lamut)	1,905	1,953	1,587	1,371	1,141	Lamut
Maga	497	463	349	386	847	Mayoyao
Maggok	636	615	687	673	611	Hungduan
Magulon	1,145	1,153	1,020	1,004	732	Lamut
Magulon	433	515	442	588	839	Mayoyao
Majlong	485	521	523	471	782	Aguinaldo
Mapawoy	877	874	683	880	1,015	Mayoyao
Mayoyao Proper	546	530	417	511	739	Mayoyao
Mompolia	1,313	1,319	1,419	1,747	1,528	Hingyon
Mongayang	2,033	1,743	1,512	900	1,010	Aguinaldo
Mongol	313	463	432	536	1,090	Mayoyao
Montabiong	494	464	489	544	506	Lagawe
Mungayang	1,198	1,113	1,044	935	781	Kiangan
Nagacadan	816	768	789	780	722	Kiangan
Nalbu	477	488	412	496	604	Mayoyao
Namal	1,906	1,867	1,576	1,444	–	Asipulo
Namillangan	1,841	1,800	1,689	1,465	1,262	Alfonso Lista (Potia)
Namnama	1,250	1,093	999	912	627	Alfonso Lista (Potia)
Namulditan	1,035	1,048	1,026	1,010	874	Hingyon
Nattum	813	801	741	568	754	Mayoyao
Nayon	1,094	1,126	1,058	979	854	Lamut
Ngileb	1,293	1,119	833	830	638	Alfonso Lista (Potia)
Northern Cababuyan	884	845	859	818	1,387	Hingyon
Nungawa	562	520	634	411	–	Asipulo
Nungulunan	857	744	816	827	717	Hungduan
O-ong	1,439	1,817	1,488	1,149	996	Hingyon
Ohaj	826	879	916	862	589	Banaue
Olilicon	465	513	461	468	419	Lagawe
Palaad	361	349	330	435	672	Mayoyao
Panopdopan	963	987	1,010	997	851	Lamut
Panubtuban	952	923	760	634	–	Asipulo
Payawan	1,473	1,436	1,110	1,164	938	Lamut
Pieza	700	627	695	708	584	Lamut
Pindongan	1,146	1,194	1,134	966	890	Kiangan
Pinto	2,951	2,425	2,260	1,690	1,472	Alfonso Lista (Potia)
Piwong	1,183	1,138	1,097	985	710	Hingyon
Poblacion	1,726	1,474	1,290	1,048	933	Alfonso Lista (Potia)
Poblacion	2,596	2,594	2,312	2,056	1,691	Banaue
Poblacion	1,545	1,486	1,700	1,491	1,272	Hungduan
Poblacion	1,633	1,545	1,596	1,530	1,574	Kiangan
Poblacion	1,047	1,027	880	1,021	1,214	Mayoyao
Poblacion (Hingyon)	842	960	970	993	854	Hingyon
Poblacion East	2,294	2,175	1,892	1,964	–	Lagawe
Poblacion East	1,836	1,985	1,668	1,386	1,154	Lamut
Poblacion North	2,106	1,893	1,686	1,548	–	Lagawe
Poblacion South	1,039	980	778	796	5,075	Lagawe
Poblacion West	2,212	2,202	1,958	1,636	–	Lagawe
Poblacion West	2,637	2,660	2,118	1,648	1,429	Lamut
Poitan	1,808	1,725	1,761	1,456	1,158	Banaue
Ponghal	334	363	271	316	262	Lagawe
Posnaan	1,367	1,201	1,023	868	733	Aguinaldo
Pugol (Ifugao Reservation)	1,885	1,314	1,147	766	794	Lamut
Pula	1,394	1,237	1,198	1,205	–	Asipulo
Pula	582	556	535	616	–	Banaue
Pullaan	325	321	293	278	290	Lagawe
Salamague	769	698	530	574	334	Lamut
San Fernando	726	612	649	766	615	Banaue
San Jose	1,002	904	717	591	580	Alfonso Lista (Potia)
San Juan	997	1,023	997	792	753	Alfonso Lista (Potia)
San Marcos	1,312	1,332	817	610	480	Alfonso Lista (Potia)
San Quintin	1,175	1,065	941	1,048	890	Alfonso Lista (Potia)
Sanafe	1,173	1,071	766	738	595	Lamut
Santa Maria	4,312	3,845	3,002	2,255	1,955	Alfonso Lista (Potia)
Santo Domingo (Cabicalan)	1,559	1,362	1,177	961	768	Alfonso Lista (Potia)
Ta-ang	552	534	546	507	1,058	Aguinaldo
Talboc	514	544	461	455	944	Mayoyao
Talite	724	646	581	571	722	Aguinaldo
Tam-an	1,435	1,449	1,263	1,079	977	Banaue
Tinoc	2,263	1,800	1,609	1,443	1,298	Tinoc
Tukucan	1,157	1,111	1,002	885	721	Tinoc
Tulaed	440	580	350	380	1,102	Mayoyao
Tulludan	850	707	509	417	386	Tinoc
Tungngod	881	853	678	552	399	Lagawe
Tupaya	584	515	522	613	586	Lagawe
Tuplac	1,501	1,594	1,207	1,372	1,024	Kiangan
Ubao	2,327	1,970	1,879	1,613	1,483	Aguinaldo
Ubuag	337	331	456	420	407	Hingyon
Umalbong	789	734	746	755	691	Hingyon
Umilag	868	909	767	767	555	Lamut
View Point	1,498	1,406	1,297	1,308	948	Banaue
Wangwang	965	778	617	650	561	Tinoc
Barangay	2010	2007	2000	1995	1990	Municipality
*Italicized names are former names.; *Dashes (–) in cells indicate unavailable census data.

[top]
