= Ifugao Provincial Board =

Legislative body of the province of Ifugao, Philippines

Ifugao Provincial Board Sangguniang Panlalawigan ng Ifugao

Type
- Type: Unicameral
- Term limits: 3 terms (9 years)

Leadership
- Presiding Officer: Martin L. Habawel Jr., PDP-Laban since June 30, 2025

Structure
- Seats: 13 board members 1 ex officio presiding officer
- Political groups: Lakas-CMD (5) PFP (2) NPC (1) Independent (2) TBD (1) Nonpartisan (2)
- Length of term: 3 years
- Authority: Local Government Code of the Philippines

Elections
- Voting system: Multiple non-transferable vote (regular members); Indirect election (ex officio members)
- Last election: May 12, 2025
- Next election: May 15, 2028

Meeting place
- Ifugao Provincial Capitol, Lagawe

The Ifugao Provincial Board is the Sangguniang Panlalawigan (provincial legislature) of the Philippine province of Ifugao.

The members are elected via plurality-at-large voting: the province is divided into two districts, each having four seats. A voter votes up to four names, with the top four candidates per district being elected. The vice governor is the ex officio presiding officer, and only votes to break ties. The vice governor is elected via the plurality voting system province-wide.

Aside from the regular members, the board also includes the provincial federation presidents of the Liga ng mga Barangay (ABC, from its old name "Association of Barangay Captains"), the Sangguniang Kabataan (SK, youth councils) and the Philippine Councilors League (PCL).

== Apportionment ==
The districts used in appropriation of members is not coextensive with the legislative district of Ifugao; unlike congressional representation which is at-large, Ifugao is divided into two districts for representation in the Sangguniang Panlalawigan.

The first district includes the western side of the province, encompassing the capital, Lagawe, as well as the municipalities of Asipulo, Hingyon, Hungduan, Kiangan, Lamut, and Tinoc. The second district comprises the eastern municipalities of Aguinaldo, Alfonso Lista, Banaue, and Mayoyao.

In 2025, the second district gained 2 additional seats after the Department of Finance upgraded the province's income classification to 2nd class, from 3rd class.

Elections	Seats per district		Ex officio seats	Total seats
Elections	1st	2nd	Ex officio seats	Total seats
2010–2025	4	4	3	11
2025–present	6	4	3	13

== List of members ==
=== Current members ===
These are the members after the 2025 local elections and 2023 barangay and SK elections:

- Vice Governor: Martin L. Habawel Jr. (PDP-Laban)

Seat	Board member	Party	Start of term	End of term
1st district	Jose T. Gullitaw	Independent	June 30, 2022	June 30, 2028
1st district	Pedro G. Mayam-o	PFP	June 30, 2025	June 30, 2028
1st district	Dulnuan D. Habbiling	PFP	June 30, 2022	June 30, 2028
1st district	Joselito G. Guyguyon	Lakas-CMD	June 30, 2019	June 30, 2028
1st district	Alberto D. Binlang	Lakas-CMD	June 30, 2022	June 30, 2028
1st district	Geronimo T. Bimohya	Lakas-CMD	June 30, 2025	June 30, 2028
2nd district	Gasper B. Chilagan Jr.	NPC	June 30, 2025	June 30, 2028
2nd district	Orlando H. Addug	Independent	June 30, 2019	June 30, 2028
2nd district	Joseph J. Odan	Lakas-CMD	June 30, 2022	June 30, 2028
2nd district	Peter B. Bunnag	Lakas-CMD	June 30, 2022	June 30, 2028
ABC	James Buhulon	Nonpartisan	January 15, 2024	January 1, 2026
PCL	TBD			June 30, 2028
SK	Lance Inhumang	Nonpartisan	November 29, 2023	January 1, 2026

=== Vice Governor ===
Election year	Name	Party
2016	Jose Gullitiw	Independent
2019	Glenn Prudenciano	Liberal
2022	Glenn Prudenciano	Liberal
2025	Martin L. Habawel Jr.	PDP–Laban

=== 1st District ===
- Municipalities: Asipulo, Hingyon, Hungduan, Kiangan, Lagawe, Lamut, Tinoc
- Population (2020): 116,036

Election year	Member (party)	Member (party)	Member (party)	Member (party)	Member (party)	Member (party)
2016	Robert Mangyao (Liberal)	Victor Bunnol, Jr. (Liberal)	Geronimo Bimoyha (Independent)	Robert Humiwat (Independent)	—	
2019	Agustin Calya-en (PDP–Laban)	Ceasario Cabbigat (Independent)	Geronimo Bimoyha (Independent)	Joselito Guyguyon (Liberal)	—	
2022	Alberto Binlang, Jr. (Independent)	Ceasario Cabbigat (KBL)	Jordan Gullitiw (Independent)	Joselito Guyguyon (Liberal)	—	
2025	Jose T. Gullitaw (Independent)	Pedro G. Mayam-o (PFP)	Dulnuan D. Habbiling (PFP	Joselito G. Guyguyon (Lakas)	Alberto D. Binlang Jr. (Lakas)	Geronimo T. Bimohya (Lakas)

=== 2nd District ===
- Municipalities: Aguinaldo, Alfonso Lista, Banaue, Mayoyao
- Population (2020): 91,462

Election year	Member (party)	Member (party)	Member (party)	Member (party)
2016	James Frederick Dulnuan (Liberal)	Noli Maguiwe (Liberal)	Federico Juguiad, Jr. (Independent)	Clemente Bongtiwon (Independent)
2019	Orlando Addug (Independent)	Noli Maguiwe (Independent)	Perfecta Dulnuan (Independent)	Clemente Bongtiwon (Independent)
2022	Orlando Addug (Independent)	Peter Bunnag (Independent)	Perfecta Dulnuan (Independent)	Joseph Odan (Liberal)
2025	Gasper B. Chilagan Jr. (NPC)	Orlando H. Addug (Independent)	Joseph J. Odan (Lakas)	Peter B. Bunnag (Lakas)
