= List of vice governors of Ifugao =

Vice Governor of Ifugao
- Incumbent; Martin Omar Habawel since June 30, 2025
- Seat: Ifugao Provincial Capitol
- Nominator: Political party
- Term length: 3 years Up to three terms

The Vice Governor of Ifugao (Filipino: Pangalawang Punong Lalawigan ng Ifugao) is the presiding officer of the Sangguniang Panlalawigan, the legislature of the provincial government of Ifugao, Philippines.

The current vice governor is Martin Omar Habawel, in office since 2025.

== List of Vice Governors ==
No.	Vice Governor	Term
1	Manuel N. Tuguinay, Sr.	1967
2	Carlos D. Luglug, Sr.	1967-1971
3	John C. Langabayan	1972-1975
(2)	Carlos D. Luglug, Sr.	1980-1986
4	Evelyn S. Dunuan	1986-1987
5	Napoleon B. Hangdaan	1987-1988
6	Albert D. Pawingi	1988-1992
7	Herman B. Dinumla	1992-1995
8	Juan B. Dacawe	1995-1996
9	Robert B. Mangyao	1998-2001
10	Dominga Bella G. Takinan	2001-2004
9	Glenn D. Prudenciano	2004-2006
10	Noli G. Maguiwe	2006-2007
11	Nora D. Dinamling	2007-2010
12	Pedro G. Mayam-o	2010-2016
13	Jose T. Gullitiw	2016-2019
(9)	Glenn D. Prudenciano	2019-2025
14	Martin Omar Habawel	2025–present

== See also ==
- Governor of Ifugao
