= Julia Campbell (journalist) =

American journalist

- Born: January 25, 1967; Virginia, United States
- Died: April 8, 2007 (aged 40) near the Banaue Rice Terraces, Ifugao Province, Philippines
- Occupations: Peace Corps volunteer; freelance journalist
- Notable credit(s): The New York Times, People
- Family: Ed Morris (brother-in-law)

Julia Campbell (January 25, 1967 – April 8, 2007) was an American journalist. She disappeared on April 8, 2007, while working as a U.S. Peace Corps volunteer in the Philippines and discovered on April 18 in a shallow grave where she had been buried after being murdered.

The Philippine House of Representatives awarded her with its "Congressional Medal of Achievement" in June 2007. Later, an eco-park in the Philippines was established as a memorial.

== Personal ==
Julia Campbell was the daughter of US Marine Lt. Col. William R. Campbell Jr and Linda Martin Campbell. She graduated with an English degree from James Madison University

== Career ==
She began her journalism career with The Connection, a Virginian newspaper. From there she worked for the Greenwich Time in Connecticut, the Times Herald-Record in New York, and the St. Petersburg Times in Florida. She was based in New York City, working for ABCNews.com and CourtTV and contributing as a freelancer to The New York Times and People magazine, among others.

While working as a freelance reporter with the Times she was arrested while covering the funeral of rapper Notorious B.I.G. She was charged with disorderly conduct for arguing with a police officer. The charge was later dropped.

She covered Typhoon Durian from the Philippines. In 2005, Campbell changed career to become a Peace Corps volunteer in the Philippines.

== Death ==
On April 18, 2007, Campbell's body was found in a shallow grave near the village of Batad in Banaue, Ifugao Province. A search party of Philippine Army soldiers noticed her feet sticking out of a mound of fresh earth in a creek near the remote village. At the time of her death, she had been hiking to the area's rice terraces.

Juan Duntugan confessed to Campbell's death, claiming that it was not premeditated. He stated that he had just finished fighting with his neighbor when Campbell bumped into him, making him drop what he was carrying. In his anger, he hit Campbell with a rock.

In a controversial statement made during the April 20 broadcast of a local news program, Philippine Justice Secretary Raul Gonzalez stated that Campbell herself was partially to blame, that she was "a little irresponsible", that "if she was not alone, it would not have happened.", and that she was "careless".

Duntugan was found guilty of murder ("treachery and use of superior strength" being two of the aggravating circumstances) and sentenced to 40 years imprisonment (reclusion perpetua) without parole. Campbell's elder sister and her American friends were present on June 30, 2008, when Judge Ester Piscoso-Flor ordered Duntugan to pay Campbell's family P 39.67 million ($889,000) in damages, including her funeral expenses.

== Burial ==
Her remains were cremated in Manila on April 25, 2007. Afterwards, a memorial service was held at the Roman Catholic church in Fairfax, Virginia. Her brother-in-law Ed Morris, speaking for the family, said her greatest contribution was her Peace Corps service in the Philippines.

== JCampbell Park ==
JCampbell Park, also known as Julia Campbell Agroforest Memorial Eco-Park, is a 40-hectare (100-acre) eco-park in Asipulo, Ifugao. It was established in June 2007 in Campbell's memory, to advance the causes she had advocated as a community volunteer. Activities include camping, trekking and hiking aside from planting of fruit-bearing trees in the park. The land was donated by the family of Mr. and Mrs. Gerald Puguon Sr.
