= Punnuk =

Tugging ritual and game in the Philippines

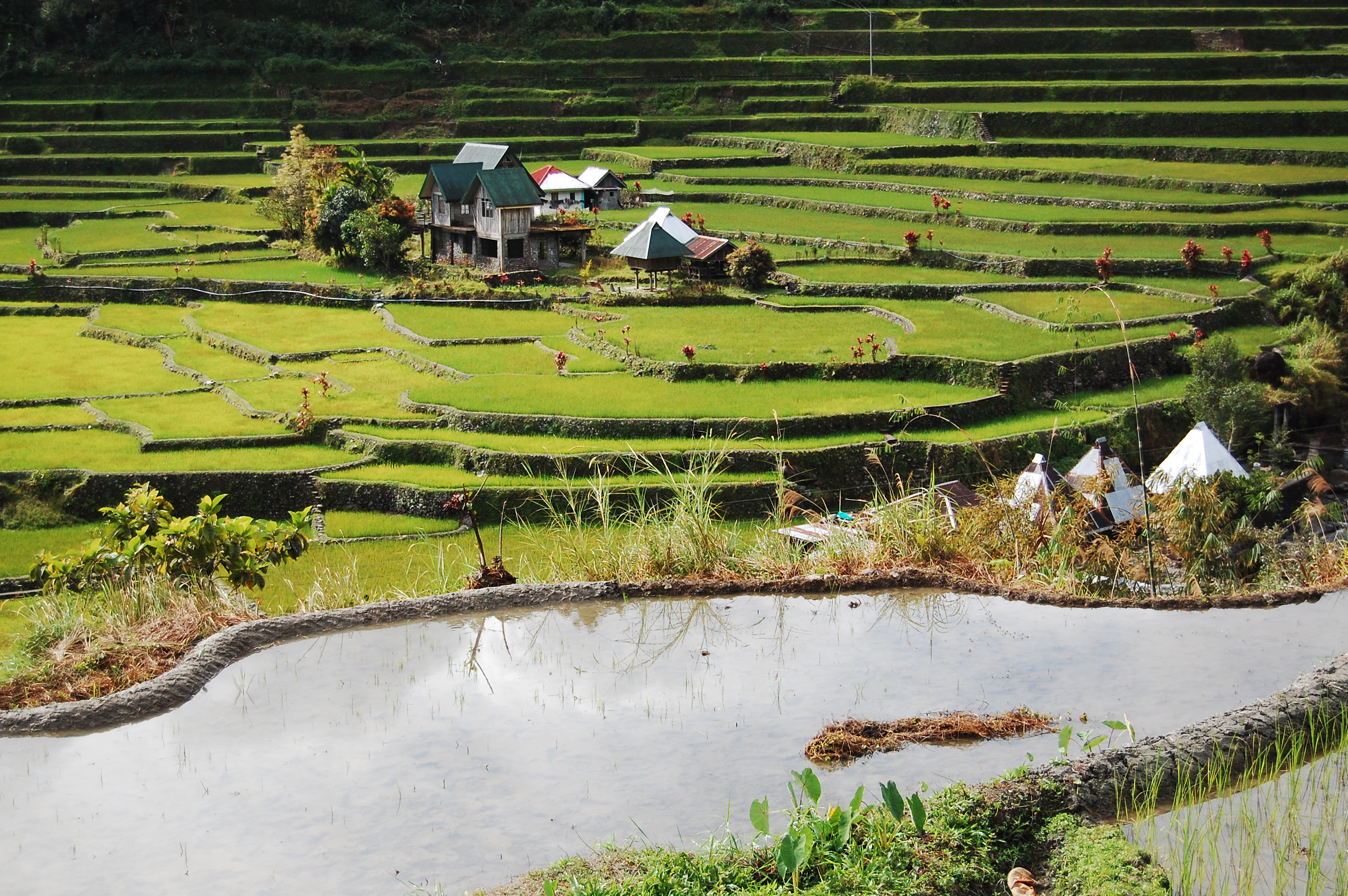
Rice terraces in Hungduan

Punnuk is a traditional tug of war from the Philippines practiced by the Tuwali-speaking people who live in Hungduan, Ifugao. The competition, held in Hapao River, is observed after the completion of harvest. It formally puts to a close the farming cycle, and signals the beginning of a new one.

== Setting ==
The barangays of Hapao Proper, Nungulunan and Baang in Hungduan, Ifugao practice punnuk. The three barangays are distinctive for their terraced ricefields with stone-walling. Hapao River, the setting for punnuk, flow from Mt. Alawitan and Mt. Polis, and is fed by tributaries from Mt Kapiligan.

== Participants ==
Traditionally, only men join punnuk in the river while the women cheer only. In 2012, a tug-of-war exclusively for women was held.

== Game ==
Punnuk needs two elements: a tinaggu (also known as kinaag) and a pakid. The tinaggu is a figure made up of rice stalks and tightly bundled with vines. The figure often resembles a scarecrow or a monitor lizard. It is the object thrown into the middle part of the river and the subject of tugging between two contending groups that are situated on opposite sides of the river across the current. To pull the tinaggu to their side, each of the groups uses a pakid, the stem of an attoba tree with a root that can be firmly hitched on the tinaggu. The first group to pull the tinaggu to their side is the winner.

It is believed that the winning side will always have their rice granary replenished and full. Meanwhile, the losers will have their harvest be easily consumed and thus will not last until the next harvest season.

== UNESCO Recognition ==
Tugging rituals and games
- UNESCO Intangible Cultural Heritage
- Country: Cambodia, Philippines, South Korea, Vietnam
- Reference: 01080
- Region: Asia and the Pacific

Inscription history
- Inscription: 2015 (10th session)
- List: Representative

Punnuk, together with tugging rituals and games in Cambodia, South Korea, and Vietnam, were collectively included in UNESCO's Intangible Cultural Heritage of Humanity List in 2015. The decision was made at the 10th Intergovernmental Committee for the Safeguarding of the Intangible Cultural Heritage meeting held in Windhoek, Namibia.
