= Aguinaldo, Ifugao =

Municipality in Ifugao, Philippines

Aguinaldo
- Municipality
- Municipality of Aguinaldo
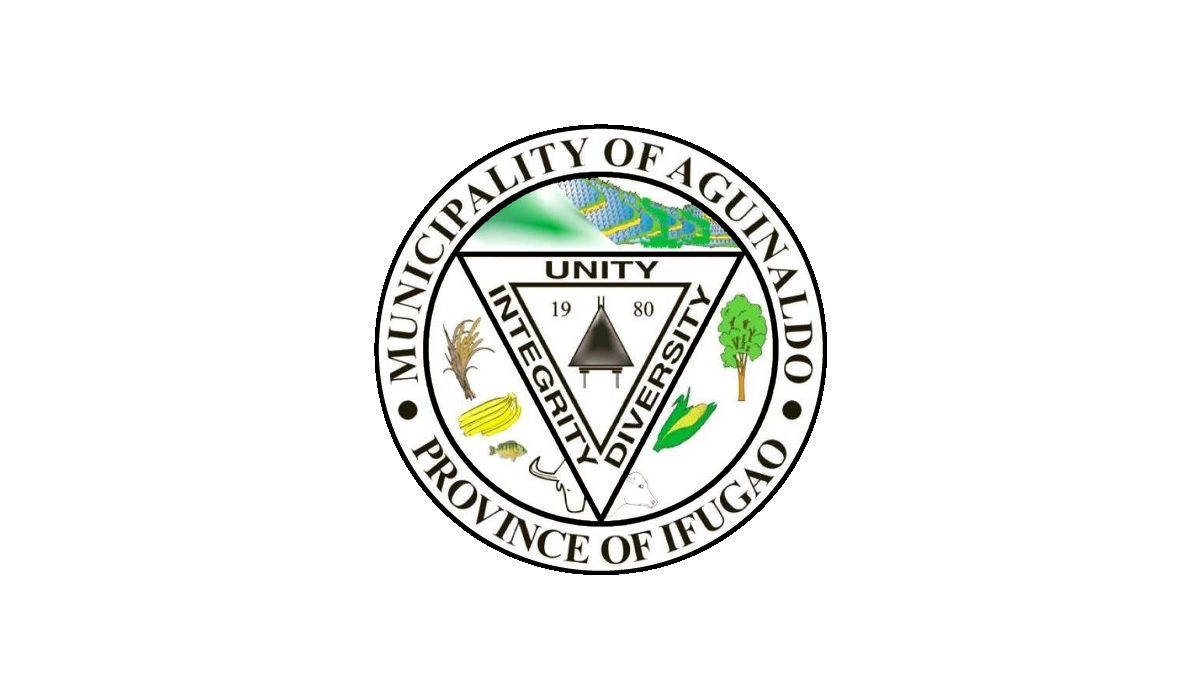
- Flag
- Motto: Integrity, Unity, Diversity
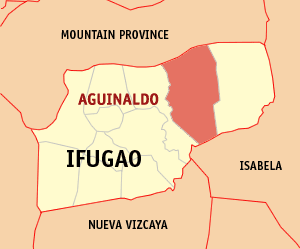
- Map of Ifugao with Aguinaldo highlighted
- Interactive map of Aguinaldo
- Location within the Philippines
- Coordinates: 16°58′44″N 121°19′38″E
- Country: Philippines
- Region: Cordillera Administrative Region
- Province: Ifugao
- District: Lone district
- Founded: September 20, 1980
- Named for: Emilio Aguinaldo
- Barangays: 16 (see Barangays)

Government
  - Type: Sangguniang Bayan
  - Mayor: Clemente S. Talusig
  - Vice Mayor: Ricky B. Uchayan
  - Representative: Solomon Chungalao
  - Municipal Council: Members: Denis B. Padiangan; Nitz Guinay B. Paynohon; Jose C. Halipan; Francis G. Hangdaan Jr.; Glenn B. Bad-angan; Homer B. Cupahan; Chamson M. Chang-goy; Sharon E. Dapuyen
  - Electorate: 12,881 voters (2025)

Area
  - Total: 538.05 km^{2} (207.74 sq mi)
- Elevation: 88 m (289 ft)
- Highest elevation: 1,457 m (4,780 ft)
- Lowest elevation: 431 m (1,414 ft)

Population (2024 census)
  - Total: 20,924
  - Density: 38.889/km^{2} (100.72/sq mi)
  - Households: 5,571

Economy
  - Income class: 1st municipal income class
  - Poverty incidence: 10.65% (2023)
  - Revenue: ₱ 207.2 million (2024)
  - Assets: ₱ 823.2 million (2024)
  - Expenditure: ₱ 195.9 million (2024)
  - Liabilities: ₱ 251.5 million (2024)

Service provider
  - Electricity: Ifugao Electric Cooperative (IFELCO)
- Time zone: UTC+8 (PST)
- ZIP code: 3606
- PSGC: 1402708000
- IDD : area code: +63 (0)74
- Native languages: Ifugao; Tuwali; Ilocano; Tagalog
- Website: www.aguinaldo.gov.ph

Aguinaldo, officially the Municipality of Aguinaldo, is a municipality in the province of Ifugao, Philippines. According to the 2024 census, it has a population of 20,924 people.

== Etymology ==
The town was named Aguinaldo in honor of Emilio Aguinaldo, the first President of the Philippines, who is believed to have passed through the area during the Philippine–American War. Before its creation in 1980, the area was known as Bunhian, then a part of the municipality of Mayoyao.

== History ==
The Municipality of Aguinaldo was officially created through Batas Pambansa Bilang 86, which was approved on September 20, 1980. The law separated several barangays—Bunhian, Damag, Galonogon, Itab, Jacmal, Ta-ang, Talete, and Ubao—from the Municipality of Mayoyao in the province of Ifugao.

Prior to its creation, the area that now comprises Aguinaldo was known collectively as Bunhian, a part of Mayoyao. During the 1970s, local leaders from the aforementioned barangays began advocating for separation and the establishment of their own municipality. This movement was supported by Romulo Lumauig and Gualberto Lumauig, who represented Ifugao in the House of Representatives and the Interim Batasang Pambansa, respectively.

Their efforts culminated in the enactment of Batas Pambansa Blg. 86, signed into law by then-President Ferdinand Marcos, formally establishing the Municipality of Aguinaldo. The municipality was named after Emilio Aguinaldo, the first President of the Philippines, who is believed to have passed through the area while fleeing from American forces during the Philippine-American War.

== Geography ==
Aguinaldo is situated 82.10 kilometres (51.01 mi) from the provincial capital Lagawe, and 409.59 kilometres (254.51 mi) from the country's capital city of Manila.

=== Barangays ===
Aguinaldo is politically subdivided into 16 barangays. Each barangay consists of puroks and some have sitios.

- Awayan
- Bunhian
- Butac
- Buwag
- Chalalo
- Damag
- Galonogon
- Halag
- Itab
- Jacmal
- Majlong
- Mongayang
- Posnaan
- Ta-ang
- Talite
- Ubao

=== Climate ===
Climate data for Aguinaldo, Ifugao
Month	Jan	Feb	Mar	Apr	May	Jun	Jul	Aug	Sep	Oct	Nov	Dec	Year
Mean daily maximum °C (°F)	21 (70)	23 (73)	25 (77)	28 (82)	28 (82)	27 (81)	27 (81)	26 (79)	26 (79)	25 (77)	24 (75)	22 (72)	25 (77)
Mean daily minimum °C (°F)	16 (61)	16 (61)	17 (63)	19 (66)	20 (68)	20 (68)	20 (68)	20 (68)	20 (68)	19 (66)	19 (66)	17 (63)	19 (66)
Average precipitation mm (inches)	103 (4.1)	73 (2.9)	49 (1.9)	38 (1.5)	141 (5.6)	144 (5.7)	172 (6.8)	181 (7.1)	155 (6.1)	148 (5.8)	147 (5.8)	208 (8.2)	1,559 (61.5)
Average rainy days	17.1	12.8	11.0	9.6	18.9	21.5	22.5	24.5	21.7	16.1	17.1	20.5	213.3
Source: Meteoblue

== Demographics ==
Population census of Aguinaldo
Year	Pop.	±% p.a.
1990	19,830	—
1995	12,623	−8.11%
2000	16,377	+5.74%
2007	17,231	+0.70%
2010	18,610	+2.84%
2015	19,408	+0.80%
2020	21,128	+1.80%
2024	20,924	−0.23%
Source: Philippine Statistics Authority

In the 2024 census, the population of Aguinaldo was 20,924 people, with a density of 39 inhabitants per square kilometre or 100 inhabitants per square mile.

== Economy ==
The economy of Aguinaldo is mostly agricultural with palay as the main crop. Aguinaldo's secondary crops include bananas, coffee, cassava, and legumes.

Poverty incidence of Aguinaldo (%)

Source: Philippine Statistics Authority

== Government ==
=== Local government ===
Aguinaldo, belonging to the lone congressional district of the province of Ifugao, is governed by a mayor designated as its local chief executive and by a municipal council as its legislative body in accordance with the Local Government Code. The mayor, vice mayor, and the councilors are elected directly by the people through an election which is being held every three years.

=== Elected officials ===
Members of the Municipal Council (2025–2028)
Position	Name
Congressman	Solomon R. Chungalao
Mayor	Clemente S. Talusig
Vice-Mayor	Ricky B. Uchayan
Councilors	Chamson M. Chang-goy
Councilors	Denis B. Padiangan
Councilors	Glenn B. Bad-angan
Councilors	Homer B. Cupahan
Councilors	Nitz Guinay B. Paynohon
Councilors	Sharon E. Dapuyen
Councilors	Jose C. Halipan
Councilors	Francis G. Hangdaan Jr.

== Education ==
The Aguinaldo Schools District Office governs all educational institutions within the municipality. It oversees the management and operations of all private and public, from primary to secondary schools.

=== Primary and elementary schools ===
- Aguinaldo Central School
- Awayan Elementary School
- Awayan Elementary School - Annex
- Bunag Primary School
- Butac Elementary School
- Buwag Primary School
- Chalalo Elementary School
- Chalalo Elementary School - Annex
- Damag Elementary School
- Galonogon Elementary School
- Haitan Primary School
- Halag Elementary School
- Halag Elementary School - Halag 1
- Halag Elementary School - Halag 3 (Riverside)
- Hulbo Elementary School
- Itab Elementary School
- Maguitawa Elementary School
- Majlong Primary School
- Manaot Elementary School
- Monggayang Elementary School
- Nepojnoc Primary School
- Pojnaan Elementary School
- Ta-ang Primary School
- Talite Primary School
- Ubao Elementary School

=== Secondary schools ===
- Aguinaldo National High School
- Riverview Polytechnic and Academic School
- Rufino I. Chungalao Science High School
- Ubao National High School
- Ubao National High School Extension
