= Hingyon =

Municipality in Ifugao, Philippines

- Municipality
- Municipality of Hingyon
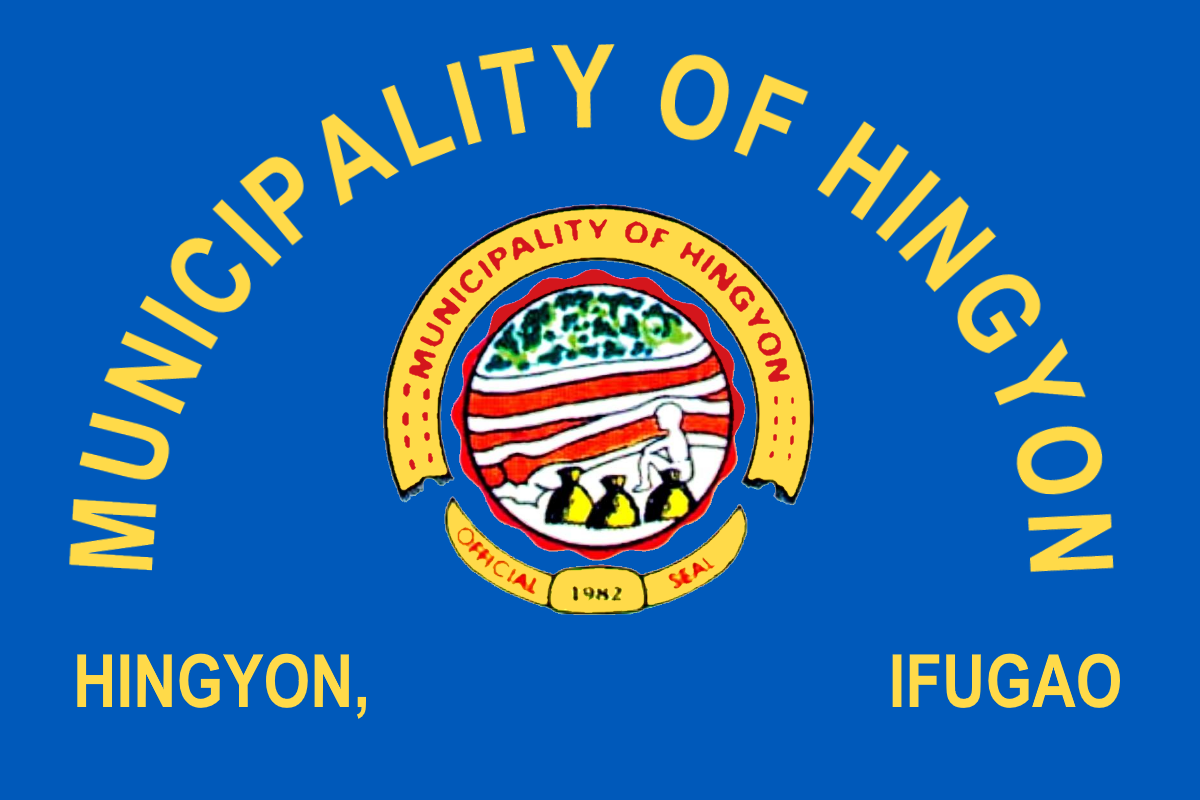
- Flag

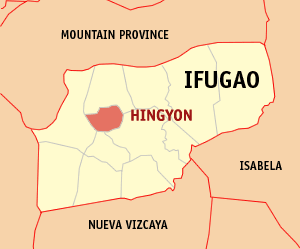
- Map of Ifugao with Hingyon highlighted
- Interactive map of Hingyon
- Location within the Philippines
- Coordinates: 16°51′08″N 121°05′56″E
- Country: Philippines
- Region: Cordillera Administrative Region
- Province: Ifugao
- District: Lone district

Government
  - Mayor: Florencio B. Nalula
  - Vice Mayor: Delfin D. Buligon
  - Representative: Solomon Chungalao
  - Municipal Council: Members: Avelino T. Dinamling; Tony B. Tupong; Romando M. Hewe; Roselyn B. Ballogan; Julian C. Abella; Ronnie K. Gumatin; Wilbert M. Umalco; Nathaniel T. Bunolna

Area
  - Total: 62.02 km^{2} (23.95 sq mi)
- Elevation: 891 m (2,923 ft)
- Highest elevation: 1,499 m (4,918 ft)
- Lowest elevation: 457 m (1,499 ft)

Population (2024 census)
  - Total: 9,966
  - Density: 160.7/km^{2} (416.2/sq mi)
  - Households: 2,346

Economy
  - Income class: 5th municipal income class
  - Poverty incidence: 10.1% (2023)
  - Revenue: ₱ 111.9 million (2024)
  - Assets: ₱ 256.6 million (2024)
  - Expenditure: ₱ 109.6 million (2024)
  - Liabilities: ₱ 17.91 million (2024)

Service provider
  - Electricity: Ifugao Electric Cooperative (IFELCO)
- Time zone: UTC+8 (PST)
- ZIP code: 3607
- PSGC: 1402709000
- IDD : area code: +63 (0)74
- Native languages: Ifugao; Tuwali; Ilocano; Tagalog
- Website: https://hingyon.gov.ph/

Hingyon, officially the Municipality of Hingyon is a municipality in the province of Ifugao, Philippines. According to the 2024 census, it has a population of 9,966 people.

== Geography ==
Hingyon is situated at 16°51’North, 121°6’ East, on the island of Luzon. Positioned at an elevation of approximately 889.4 meters or 2,917.3 feet above mean sea level. It is bounded by the Municipality of Banaue to the North and East, Lagawe, Ifugao to the South, and Kiangan, Ifugao to the West, Hingyon spans a total land area of 6363.07 hectares, organized into 12 barangays.

Hingyon is situated 10.45 kilometres (6.49 mi) from the provincial capital Lagawe, and 360.42 kilometres (223.95 mi) from the country's capital city of Manila.

=== Barangays ===
- Anao
- Bangtinon
- Bitu
- Mompolia
- Namulditan
- Northern Cababuyan
- O-ong
- Piwong
- Poblacion
- Southern Cababuyan
- Ubuag
- Umalbong

=== Climate ===
Climate data for Hingyon, Ifugao
Month	Jan	Feb	Mar	Apr	May	Jun	Jul	Aug	Sep	Oct	Nov	Dec	Year
Mean daily maximum °C (°F)	22 (72)	23 (73)	25 (77)	26 (79)	26 (79)	25 (77)	25 (77)	24 (75)	24 (75)	24 (75)	24 (75)	22 (72)	24 (76)
Mean daily minimum °C (°F)	15 (59)	15 (59)	16 (61)	18 (64)	20 (68)	20 (68)	20 (68)	20 (68)	19 (66)	18 (64)	17 (63)	16 (61)	18 (64)
Average precipitation mm (inches)	35 (1.4)	46 (1.8)	63 (2.5)	117 (4.6)	402 (15.8)	400 (15.7)	441 (17.4)	471 (18.5)	440 (17.3)	258 (10.2)	94 (3.7)	68 (2.7)	2,835 (111.6)
Average rainy days	9.9	11.1	13.9	18.9	26.0	27.3	28.9	28.5	26.1	19.7	14.5	12.8	237.6
Source: Meteoblue

== Demographics ==
Population census of Hingyon
Year	Pop.	±% p.a.
1990	8,373	—
1995	9,724	+2.84%
2000	9,769	+0.10%
2007	10,071	+0.42%
2010	9,795	−1.01%
2015	9,227	−1.13%
2020	9,930	+1.56%
2024	9,966	+0.09%
Source: Philippine Statistics Authority

In the 2024 census, the population of Hingyon was 9,966 people, with a density of 160 inhabitants per square kilometre or 410 inhabitants per square mile.

== Economy ==
Poverty incidence of Hingyon (%)

Source: Philippine Statistics Authority

Hingyon has known for its indigenous rice called tinawon. The major crops of Hingyon include corn, coffee, root crops, and vegetables. Hingyon is notable for weaving, woodcarving, and basketry. Hingyon was promoted as the "Agro-Eco Tourism Hub" of Ifugao.

== Government ==
=== Local government ===
Hingyon, belonging to the lone congressional district of the province of Ifugao, is governed by a mayor designated as its local chief executive and by a municipal council as its legislative body in accordance with the Local Government Code. The mayor, vice mayor, and the councilors are elected directly by the people through an election which is being held every three years.

=== Elected officials ===
Members of the Municipal Council (2025–2028)
Position	Name
Congressman	Solomon R. Chungalao
Mayor	Florencio B. Nalula
Vice-Mayor	Delfin D. Buligon
Councilors	Roselyn B. Ballogan
Councilors	Avelino T. Dinamling
Councilors	Julian C. Abella
Councilors	Ronnie K. Gumatin
Councilors	Wilbert M. Umalco
Councilors	Nathaniel T. Bunolna
Councilors	Tony T. Tupong
Councilors	Romando M. Hewe

== Education ==
The Hingyon Schools District Office governs all educational institutions within the municipality. It oversees the management and operations of all private and public, from primary to secondary schools.

=== Primary and elementary schools ===
- Anao Elementary School
- Bangtinon Elementary School
- Bitu Elementary School
- Cababuyan Elementary School
- Hingyon Central School
- Humalophop Elementary School
- Kayang Primary School
- Mompolia Elementary School
- Namulditan Elementary School
- Northern Cababuyan Elementary School - Annex
- O-ong Elementary School
- Pitawan Elementary School
- Piwong Elementary School
- Ubuag Primary School
- Umalbong Elementary School

=== Secondary schools ===
- Hingyon National High School
- Namulditan Elementary School (Senior High School)
- Southern Hingyon National High School
