= Ifugao =

Province in Cordillera, Philippines

- Province
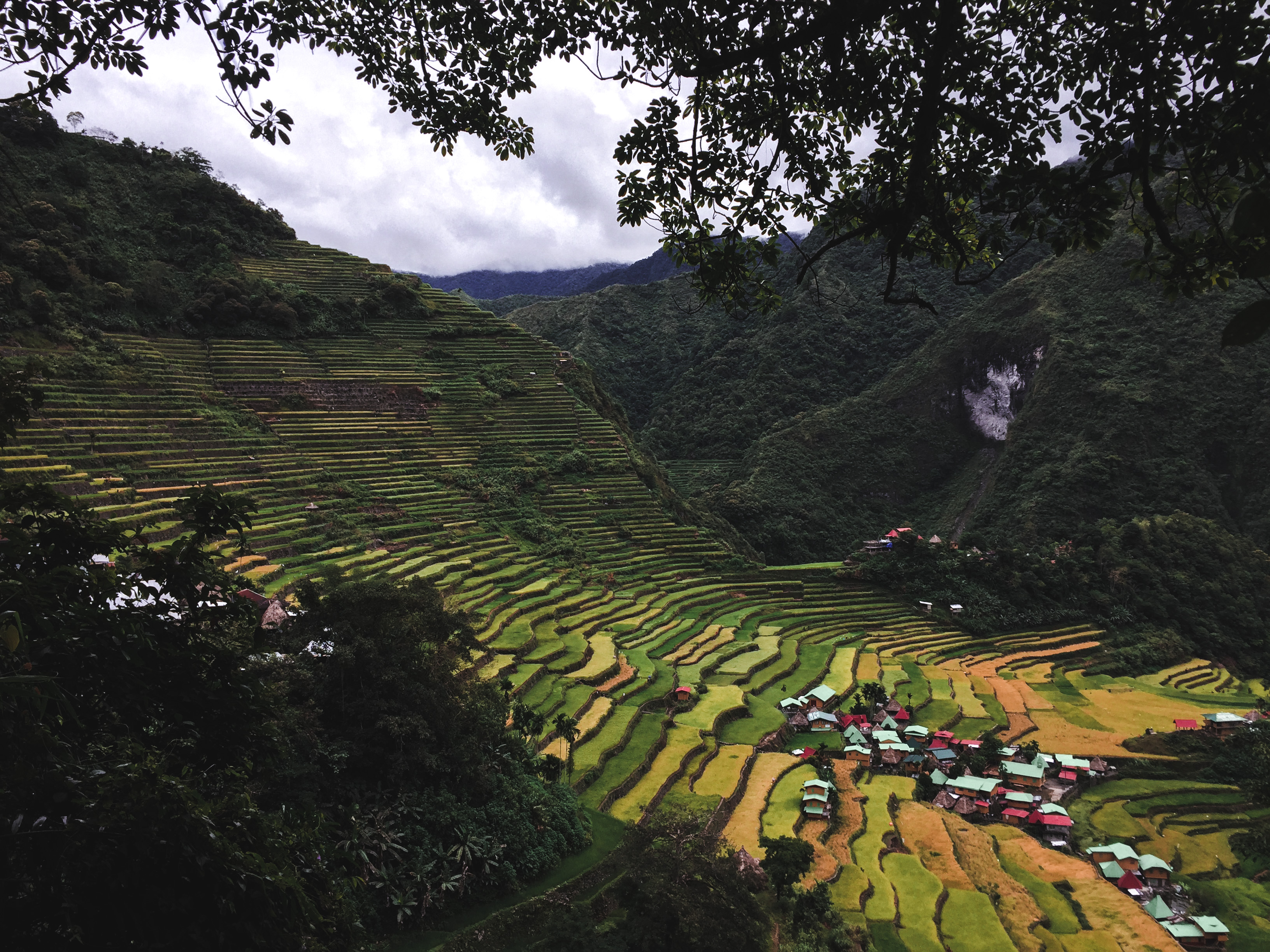
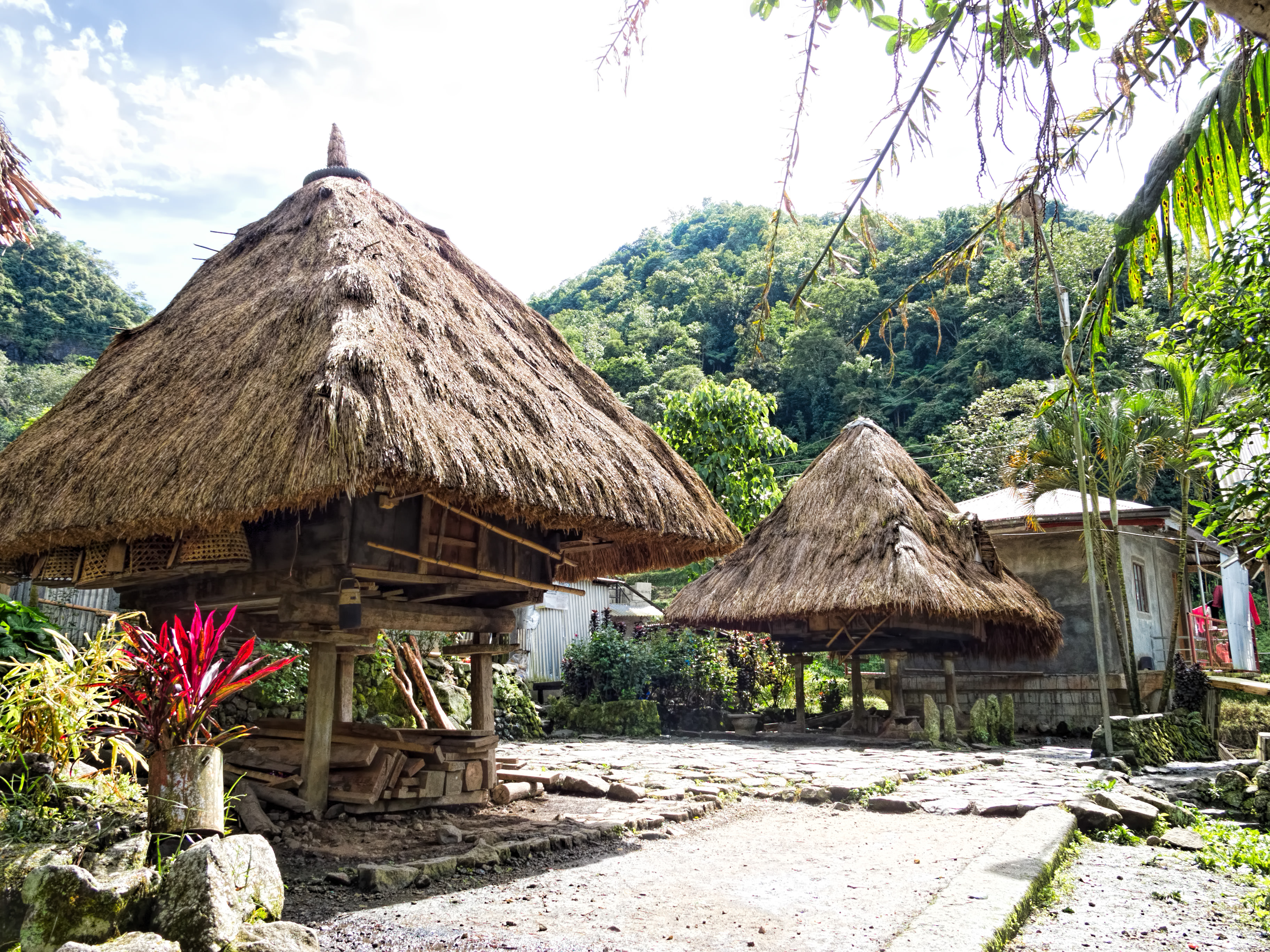
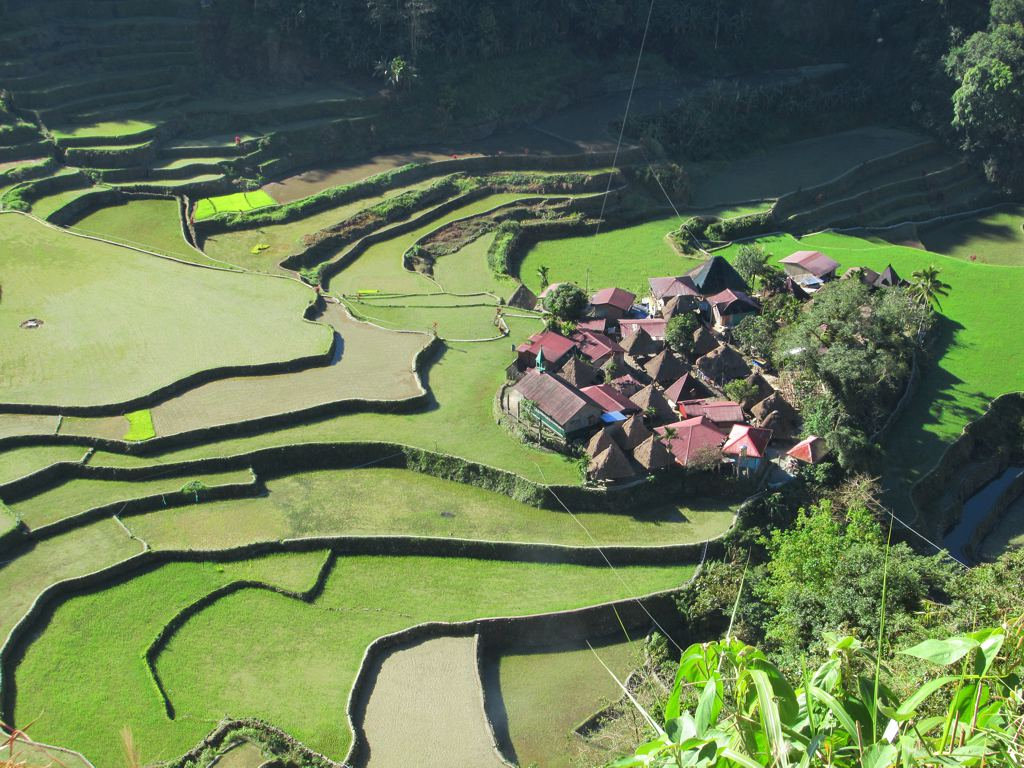
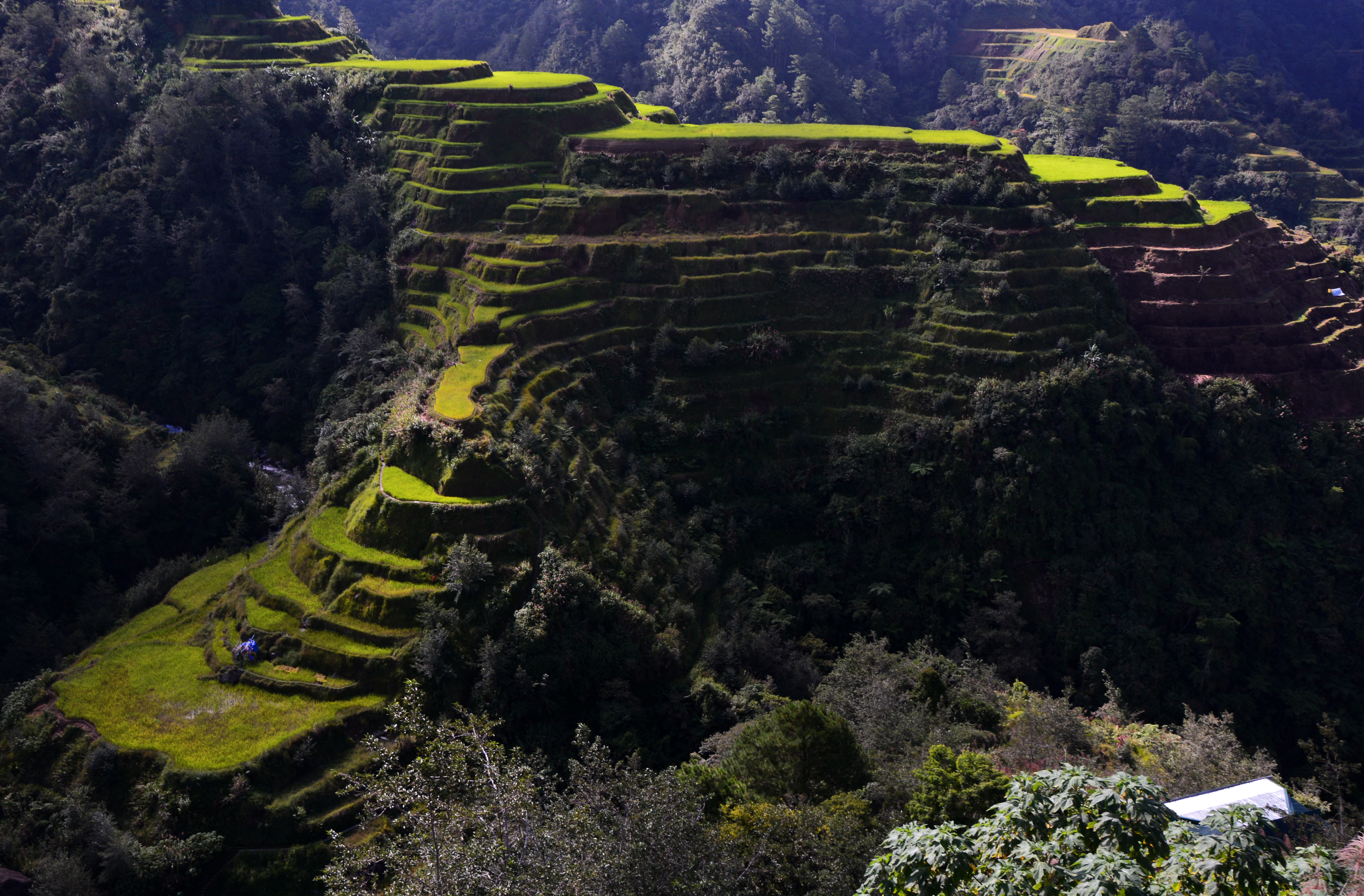
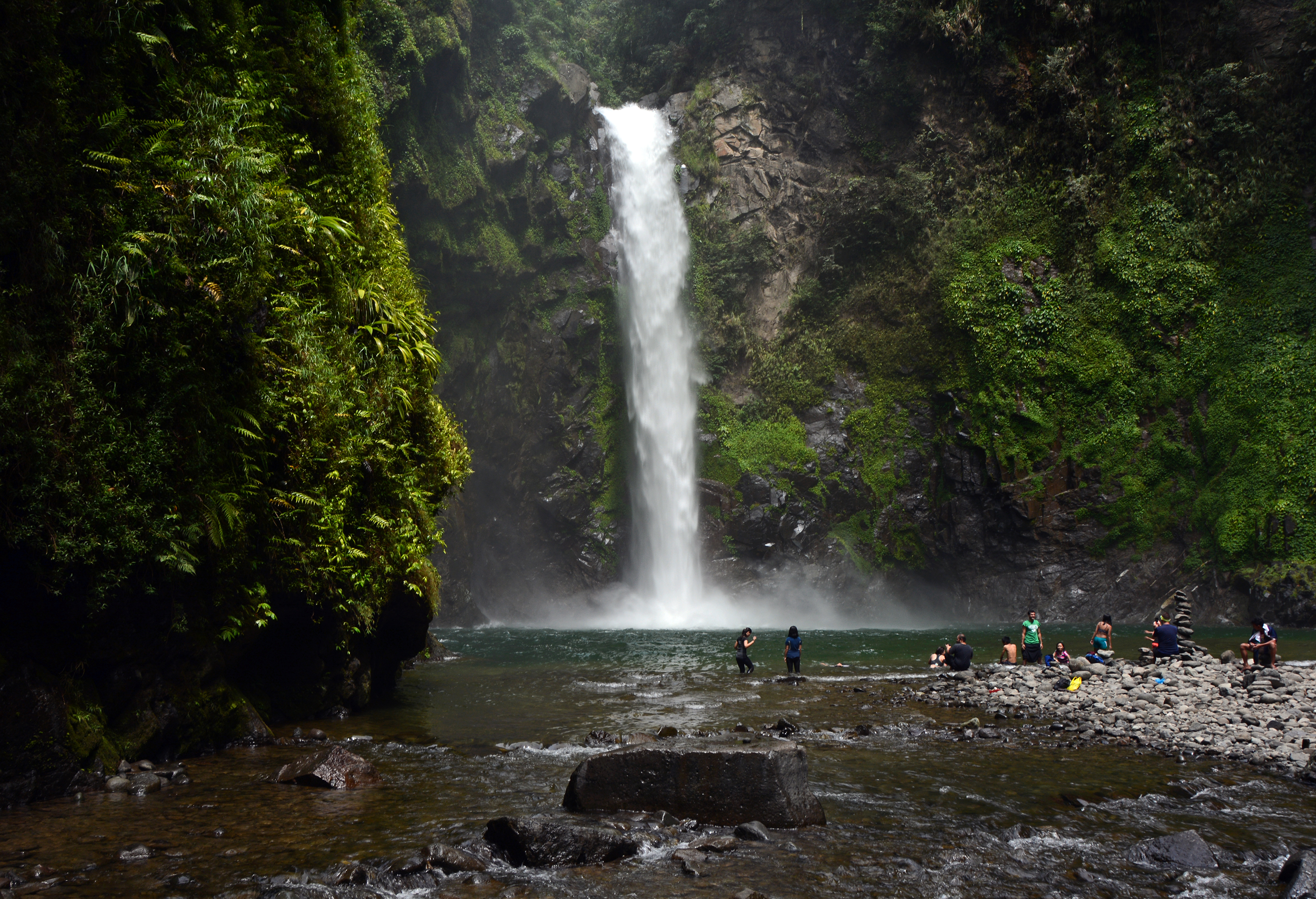
- Clockwise from the top: Batad Rice Terraces, Bangaan Rice Terraces, Tappiya Falls, Banaue Rice Terraces, Ifugao stilt houses

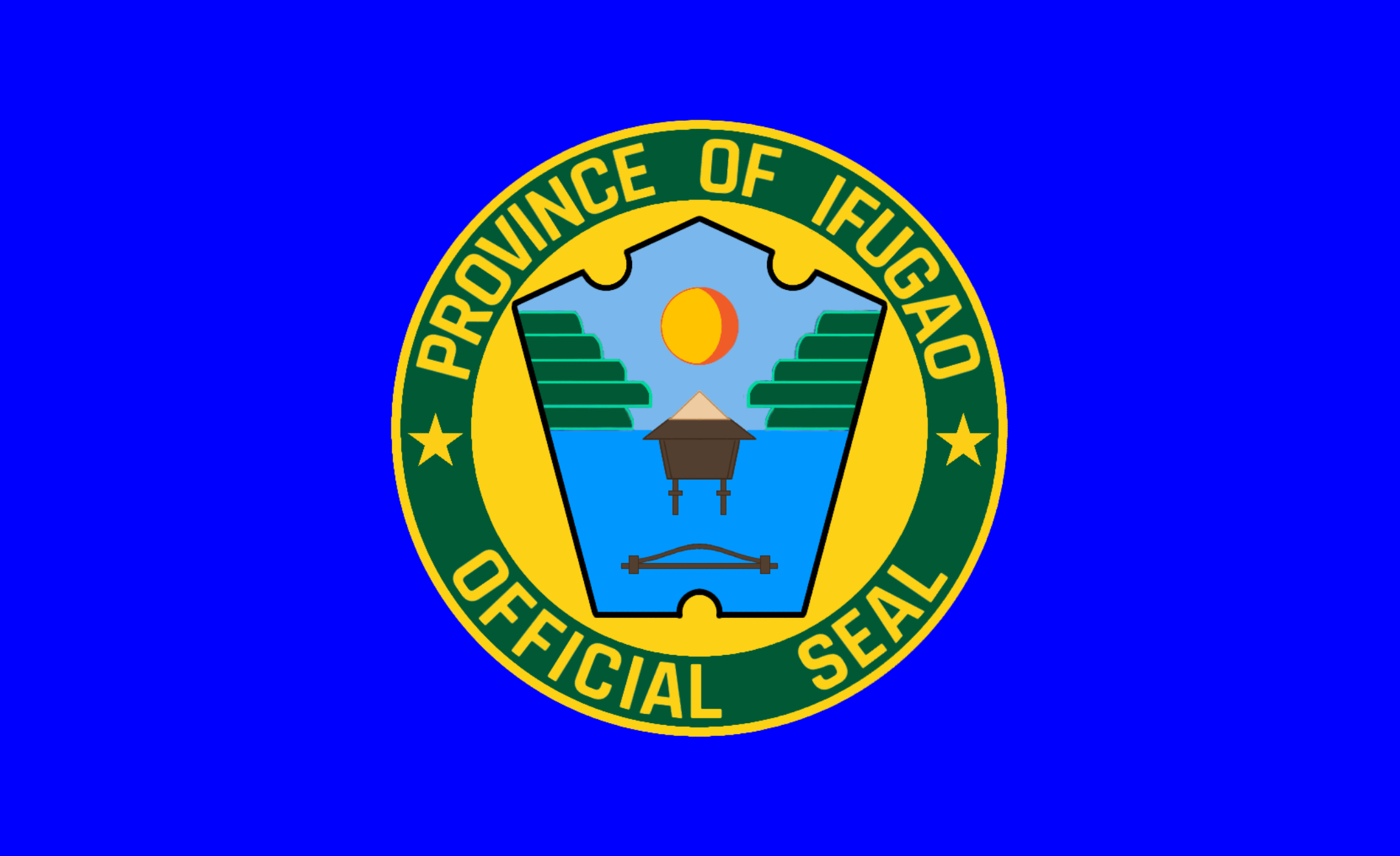
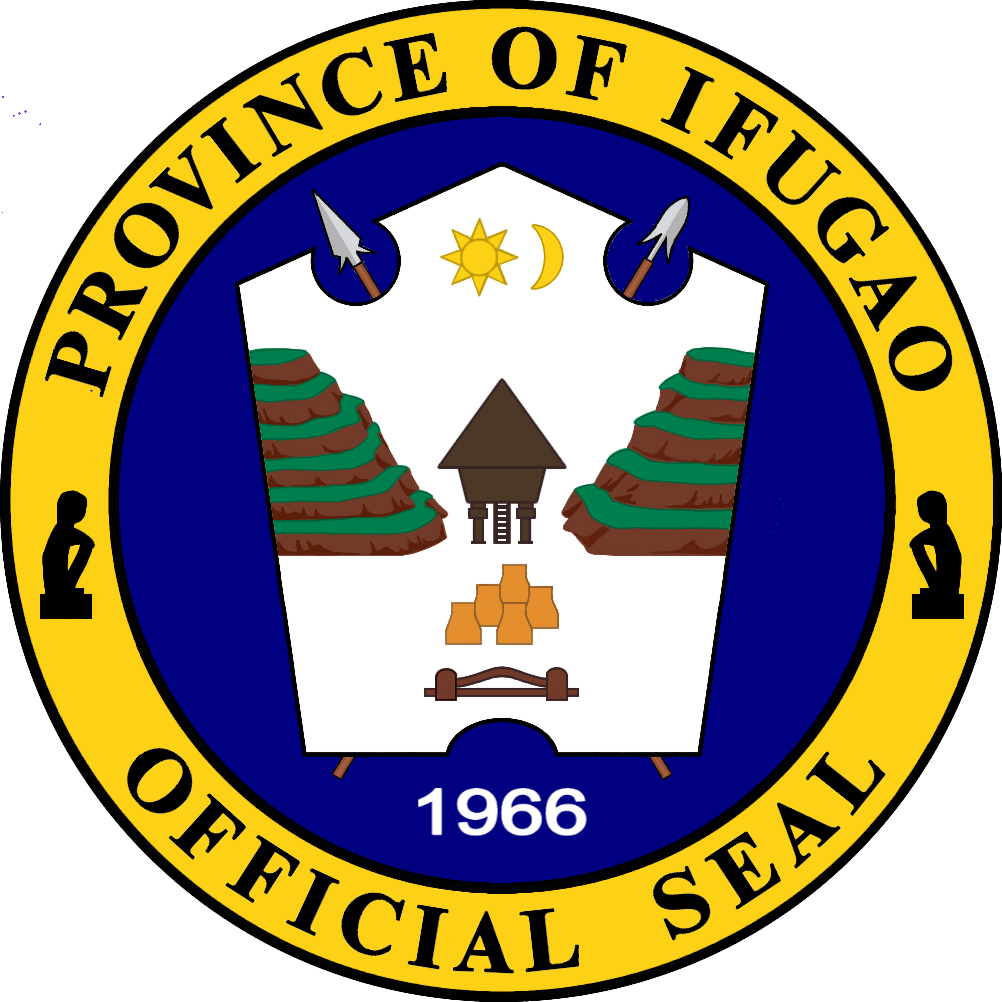
- Flag Seal

- Location in the Philippines
- Interactive map of Ifugao
- Coordinates: 16°50′N 121°10′E
- Country: Philippines
- Region: Cordillera Administrative Region
- Founded: June 18, 1966
- Capital: Lagawe
- Largest Municipality: Alfonso Lista

Government
  - Governor: Jerry U. Dalipog (Lakas)
  - Vice Governor: Martin L. Habawel Jr. (PDP)
  - Representative: Solomon Chungalao
  - Legislature: Ifugao Provincial Board
  - Electorate: 136,318 voters (2025)

Area
  - Total: 2,628.21 km^{2} (1,014.76 sq mi)
  - Rank: 50th out of 82
- Highest elevation (Mount Pulag): 2,928 m (9,606 ft)

Population (2024 census)
  - Total: 208,668
  - Rank: 72nd out of 82
  - Density: 79.3955/km^{2} (205.633/sq mi)
  - Rank: 74th out of 82
  - Households: 48,756
- Demonyms: Ifugao; Ifugaoan

Divisions
  - Independent cities: 0
  - Component cities: 0
  - Municipalities: 11: Aguinaldo; Alfonso Lista; Asipulo; Banaue; Hingyon; Hungduan; Kiangan; Lagawe; Lamut; Mayoyao; Tinoc
  - Barangays: 176
  - Districts: Legislative districts of Ifugao

Economy
  - Income class: 3rd provincial income class, 2nd provincial income class
  - Poverty incidence: 4.6% (2023)
  - Revenue: ₱ 1,528 million (2024)
  - Assets: ₱ 4,269 million (2024)
  - Expenditure: ₱ 1,648 million (2024)
  - Liabilities: ₱ 918.5 million (2024)
- Time zone: UTC+8 (PHT)
- PSGC: 142700000
- IDD : area code: +63 (0)74
- ISO 3166 code: PH-IFU
- Spoken languages: Ifugao; Tuwali; Kalanguya; Ilocano; Tagalog; English

Ifugao, officially the Province of Ifugao (Ilocano: Probinsia ti Ifugao; Tagalog: Lalawigan ng Ifugao), is a landlocked province of the Philippines in the Cordillera Administrative Region in Luzon. Its capital is Lagawe and it borders Benguet to the west, Mountain Province to the north, Isabela to the east, and Nueva Vizcaya to the south.

The Rice Terraces of the Philippine Cordilleras and Banaue Rice Terraces are the main tourist attractions in the province. These terraces are believed to have been hand-carved into the mountains 2,000 years ago to plant rice. However, recent research by carbon dating suggests that they were built much later. In 1995, the Rice Terraces of the Philippine Cordilleras were declared as a UNESCO World Heritage Site. In 2008 and 2015, the Hudhud chants of the Ifugao and the Punnuk (Tugging rituals and games) were inscribed in the UNESCO Intangible Cultural Heritage Lists.

== Etymology ==
Ifugao is named after the term i-pugo ("i" [from/people] and pugo [hill]), which translates to people of the hill. Alternatively, the province's name may have come from the word pugaw, which means "the cosmic earth", ipugaw then referring to "mortals". Finally, the name may have been derived from ipugo, a type of grain in local mythology given to the people by Matungulan, the god of grains.

== History ==
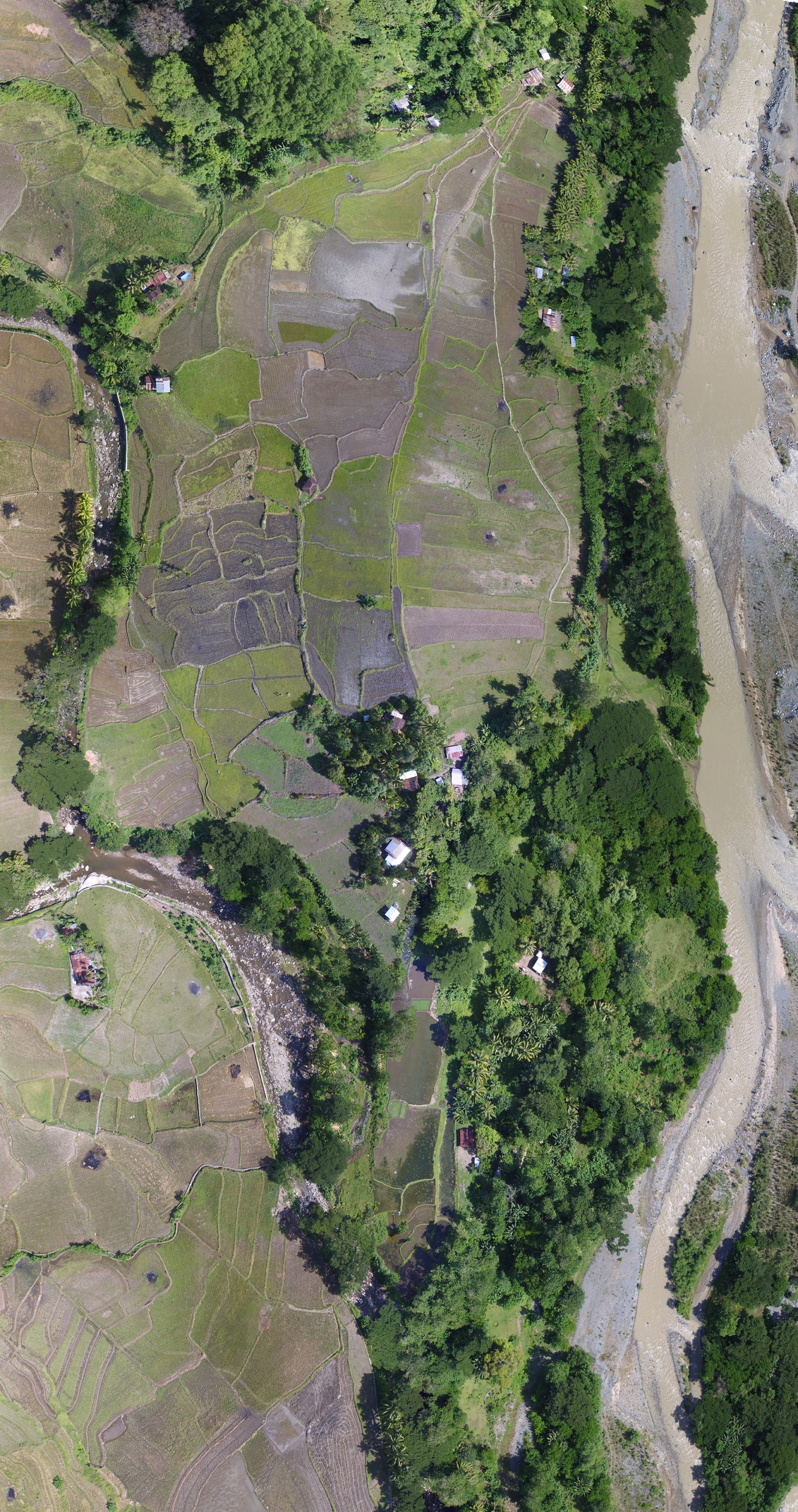
Old Kiyanggan Village

=== Precolonial era ===
The Ifugao people are thought to have been one of the first Indigenous groups and rice cultivators of the Philippines. The Old Kiyyangan Village (OKV), in particular, has been dated back to as early as 810 Before Present (B.P) to 750 B.P. As evident in various studies conducted at the OKV archaeological site and on the Ifugao people themselves, they were believed to have strong relationships with the dead, believed in several Deities with the Sun God as one of the main ones they worshipped, were a socially stratified and centralized society based on agricultural practices, and established and developed a strong intra- and inter-regional trade of luxury items, trade ware, ceramics, and raw materials.

=== Spanish colonial era ===
The Spanish had great difficulty in taking over Ifugao, like most of the Cordilleras due to the fierce belief of the Cordillera people of their rights since ancient times. The Ifugao battled colonizers for hundreds of years, even after the state was colonized and was transformed into a part of Nueva Vizcaya province of the Spanish-administered Philippines. In 1891, the Spanish government established Quiangan as a comandancia-politico-militar for the Ifugao area. The Spanish occupation in the province ended with the outbreak of the Philippine Revolution.

In the Northern Philippines, the Ifugao people are one of many minority ethnolinguistic groups best documented by ethnohistory and anthropological scholars. However, there is a dearth of historical information in the region particularly during the Spanish conquest. Changes in both demographics and cultural orientation among existing communities were to be expected during the time as certain groups resulted to migration towards the highlands. According to studies, the Ifugao succeeded multiple times resisting against the Spanish at conquest. The groups that migrated to the highlands were believed to be those that resisted the Spanish colonial control, which became prevalent in the lowlands. According to Acabado, the rugged nature of the highlands around the Ifugao region did not out rightly provide a hindrance to the Spanish conquest. Other regions that had similar rugged environment as found in Ifugao were subjected to colonial rule. Archeological research shows Ifugao practices of successful resistance by strengthening their political and economic resources. Spanish conquest and population increase was the source of shifting to wet-rice agriculture.

=== American colonial era ===
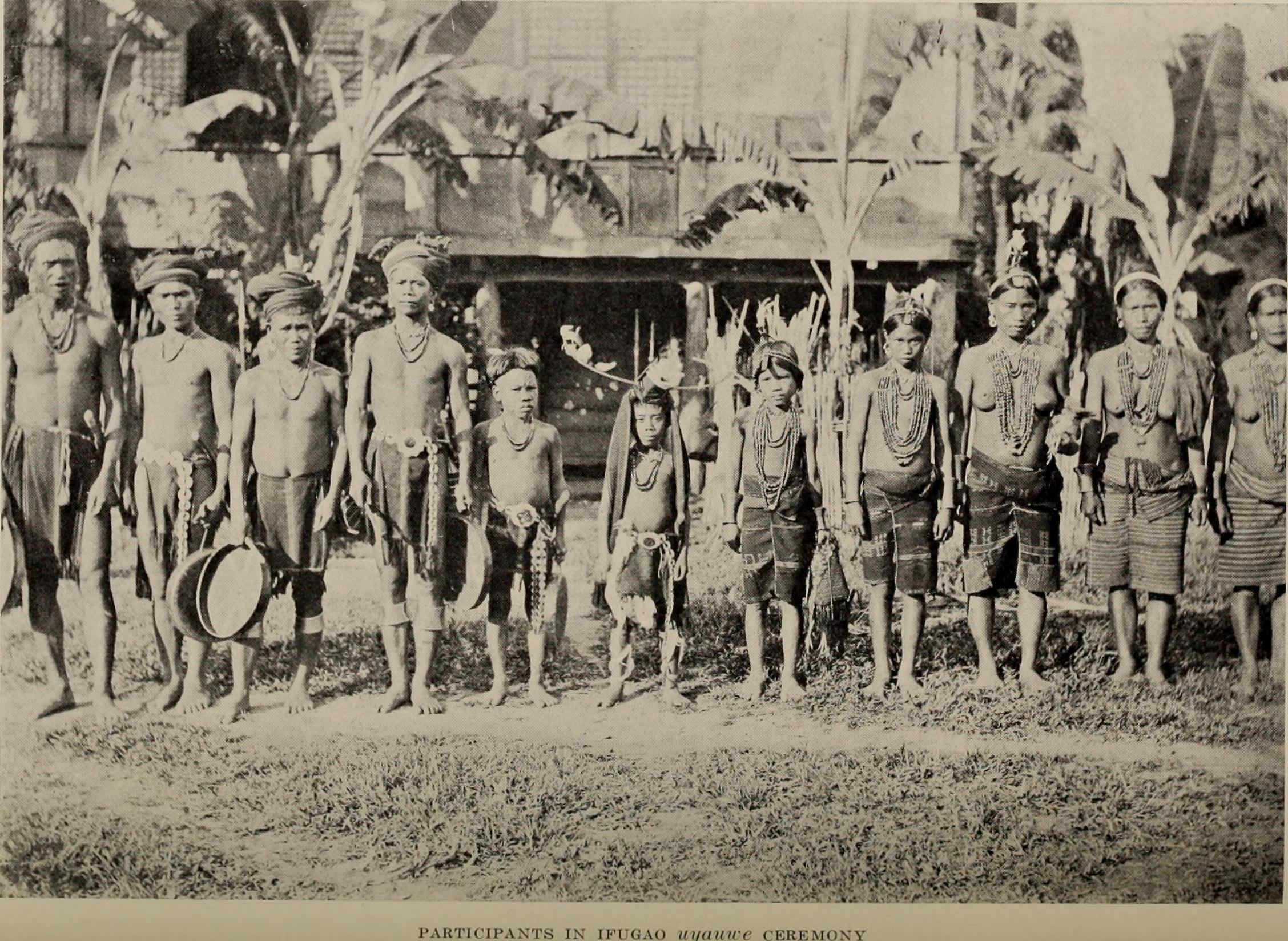
Participants in Ifugao uyauwe ceremony, c. 1903

On August 18, 1908, Ifugao was separated from Nueva Vizcaya and, along with Amburayan, Apayao, Benguet, Bontoc, Kalinga and Lepanto, was annexed to the newly created Mountain Province established by the Philippine Commission with the enactment of Act No. 1876.

=== Japanese occupation ===
Ifugao became the center of warfare in the last year of World War II when Gen. Tomoyuki Yamashita launched his last stand against the American and Philippine Commonwealth forces at Mount Napulawan. He informally surrendered to Captain Grisham of the 6th US Army in the Philippines based in Kiangan, then formally surrendered at Camp John Hay on September 3, 1945.

=== Philippine independence ===
On June 18, 1966, Republic Act No. 4695 was enacted, and Ifugao was converted into a regular province when the huge Mountain Province was split into four (the other three being Benguet, Mountain Province, and Kalinga-Apayao). Ifugao and Kalinga-Apayao were placed under the jurisdiction of the Cagayan Valley region. The capital was moved from Kiangan to Lagawe due to the harsh landscape of Kiangan which made it unsuitable for public transportation and as a capital.

==== Post-martial law era ====
On July 15, 1987, the Cordillera Administrative Region was established by then-President Corazon Aquino through Executive Order 220, and Ifugao was made one of its provinces.

=== Contemporary ===
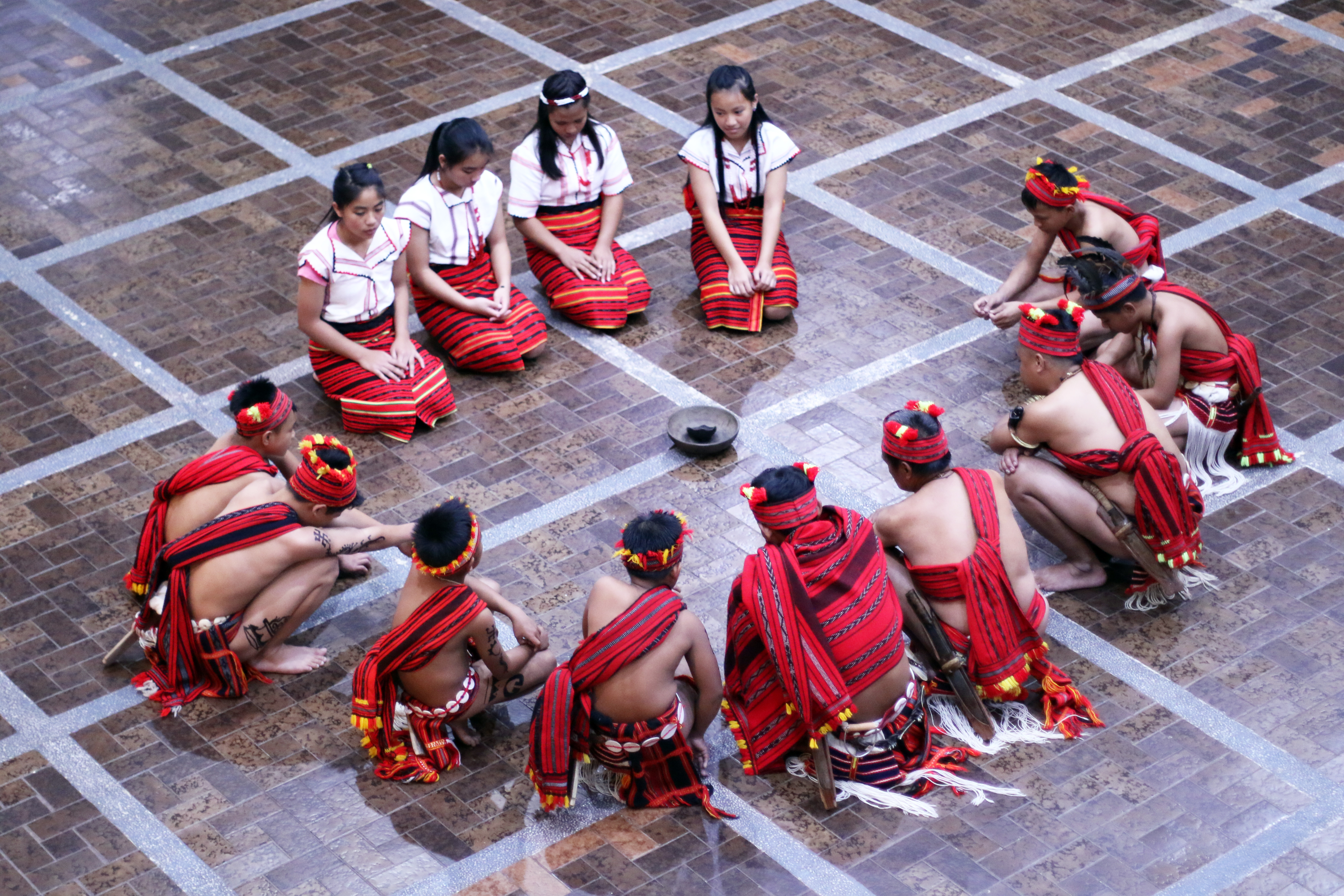
Ifugao youth in their traditional clothing.

In 1992, Republic Act No. 07173 was enacted, separating several barangays from Kiangan and constituting them under a new municipality known as Asipulo.

Since 1992, the province has observed every September 2 as "Victory Day", commemorating the valor of Philippine war veterans and the surrender of General Yamashita in the municipality of Kiangan on September 2, 1945.

In 1995, the Batad Rice Terraces, Bangaan Rice Terraces (both in Banaue), Mayoyao Rice Terraces (in Mayoyao), Hungduan Rice Terraces (in Hungduan) and Nagacadan Rice Terraces (in Kiangan, Ifugao) were inscribed by UNESCO as a World Heritage Site under the collective name "Rice Terraces of the Philippine Cordilleras".

In 2001, the Hudhud Chants of the Ifugao was chosen as one of the 11 Masterpieces of the Oral and Intangible Heritage of Humanity. It was then formally inscribed as a UNESCO Intangible Cultural Heritage in 2008.

In 2013, the official Intangible Heritage Book of the Philippine was published, and 13 of its elements were from Ifugao.

In 2014, the Philippines joined other Asian nations in establishing the support and submission of the "Tug of war" — a multinational cultural heritage or Tugging rituals and games, an Intangible Cultural Heritage that encompasses tug-of-war games in Vietnam, Cambodia, and the Philippines. The initial move of the Philippines started in 2013. The Philippines' part in the new element is represented by the tug-of-war of the Ifugaos (in Barangay Hapao, Municipality of Hungduan) called the punnuk. The element is expected to be declared as a UNESCO Intangible Cultural Heritage in 2015.

Since the 20th century, the province has been central to the archaeological research of various international institutions, mostly from the United States and the Philippines. A major discovery was the archaeological site of Kiangan, which proved the oral tradition of the Ifugao that the first settlement in the province was in Kiangan.

== Geography ==
Ifugao covers a total area of 2,628.21 square kilometres (1,014.76 sq mi) occupying the southeastern section of the Cordillera Administrative Region in Luzon. The province is bordered by Benguet to the west, Mountain Province to the north, Isabela to the east, and Nueva Vizcaya to the south.

Situated within the Cordillera Central mountain range, Ifugao is characterized by rugged terrain, river valleys, and massive forests.

=== Administrative divisions ===
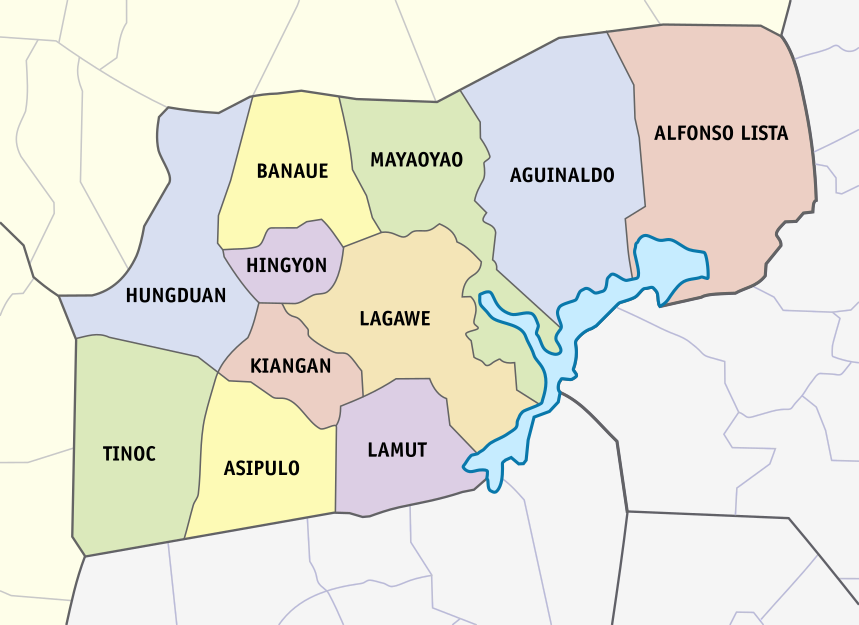
Political divisions of Ifugao

Ifugao comprises 11 municipalities, all encompassed by a lone legislative district.

Municipality (Note: The globe icon marks the town center.)		Population			±% p.a.	Area		Density		Barangay
		(2020)		(2015)		km^{2}	sq mi	/km^{2}	/sq mi	
Aguinaldo		10.2%	21,128	19,408	+1.63%	538.05	207.74	39	100	16
Alfonso Lista		16.4%	34,061	32,119	+1.12%	347.46	134.16	98	250	20
Asipulo		7.7%	15,963	15,261	+0.86%	182.87	70.61	87	230	10
Banaue		10.0%	20,652	21,837	−1.06%	191.20	73.82	110	280	18
Hingyon		4.8%	9,930	9,227	+1.41%	62.02	23.95	160	410	12
Hungduan		4.3%	8,866	9,400	−1.11%	260.30	100.50	34	88	9
Kiangan		8.5%	17,691	17,048	+0.71%	200.00	77.22	88	230	14
Lagawe	†	9.1%	18,876	19,333	−0.45%	208.91	80.66	90	230	20
Lamut		12.6%	26,235	25,279	+0.71%	149.45	57.70	180	470	18
Mayoyao		7.5%	15,621	17,331	−1.96%	238.05	91.91	66	170	27
Tinoc		8.9%	18,475	16,559	+2.11%	239.70	92.55	77	200	12
Total			207,498	202,802	+0.44%	2,628.21	1,014.76	79	200	176
	† Provincial capital					Municipality				

=== Barangays ===
The 11 municipalities of the province comprise a total of 176 barangays, with Santa Maria in Alfonso Lista (Potia) as the most populous in 2010, and Banga in Lagawe as the least.

=== Climate ===
The rainy season in Ifugao begins in July and runs through January. The weather remains cool from November to February. The mountainous terrain results in clouds often covering the peaks, creating a misty, humid, and cloudy environment. Increased intensity of rain, along with potential for floods and droughts, poses risks to the traditional agricultural landscape.

== Demographics ==
Population census of Ifugao
Year	Pop.	±% p.a.
1903	30,528	—
1918	64,400	+5.10%
1939	68,598	+0.30%
1948	49,902	−3.47%
1960	76,788	+3.66%
1970	92,487	+1.88%
1975	104,707	+2.52%
1980	111,368	+1.24%
1990	147,281	+2.83%
1995	149,598	+0.29%
2000	161,623	+1.67%
2007	180,815	+1.56%
2010	191,078	+2.03%
2015	202,802	+1.14%
2020	207,498	+0.48%
2024	208,668	+0.14%
Source: Philippine Statistics Authority

Population by ethnicity (2020)
Ethnicity	Number
Tuwali	73,383 (35.43%)
Ayangan	68,360 (33%)
Ilocano	26,677 (12.88%)
Kalanguya	25,776 (12.44%)
Kankanaey	3,184 (1.54%)
Others	9,739 (4.70%)
Not Reported	11 (0.01%)

The household population of Ifugao in the 2020 census was 207,130 people, with a density of 79 inhabitants per square kilometre or 200 inhabitants per square mile.

=== Ethnicity ===
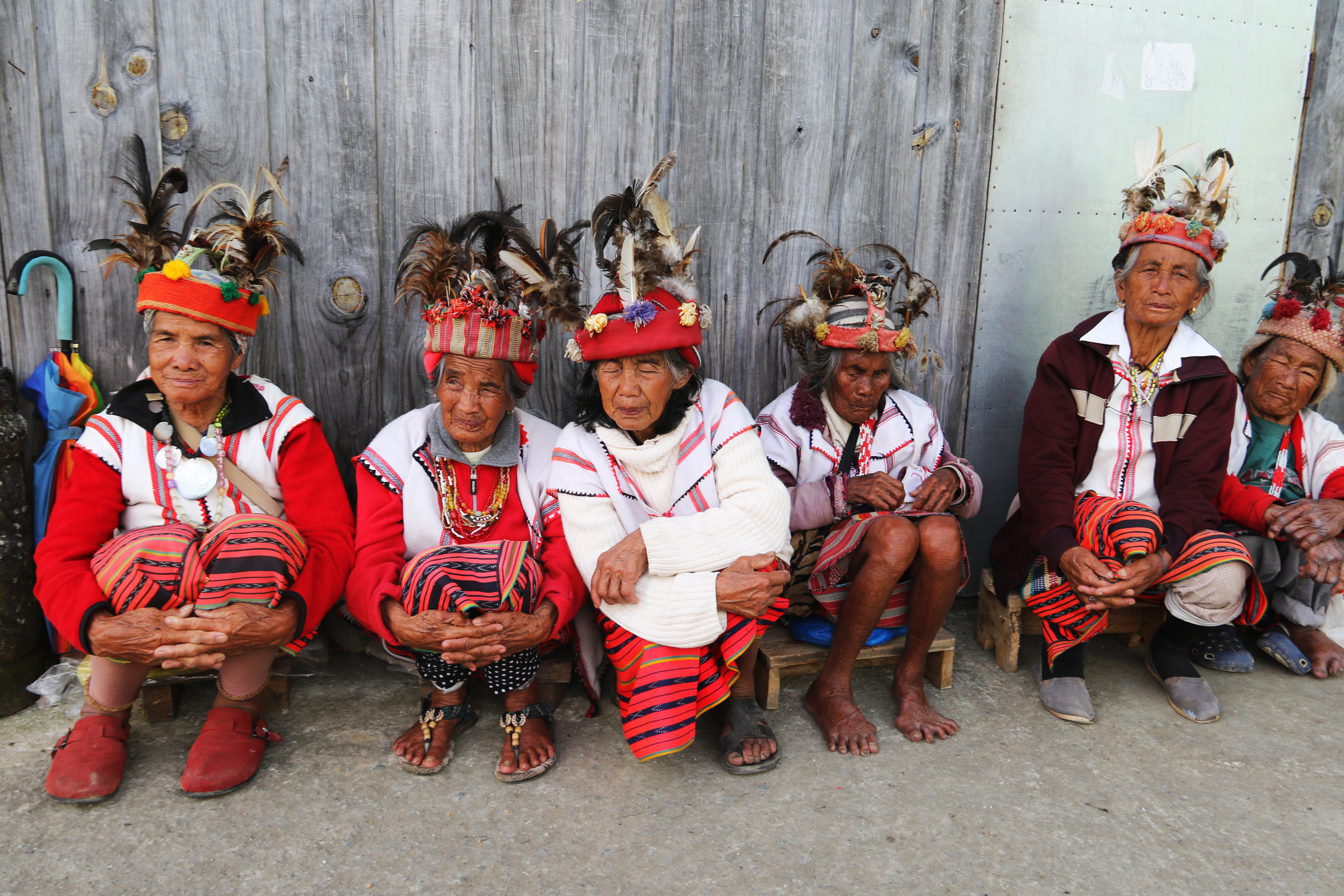
Ifugao people in their traditional clothing

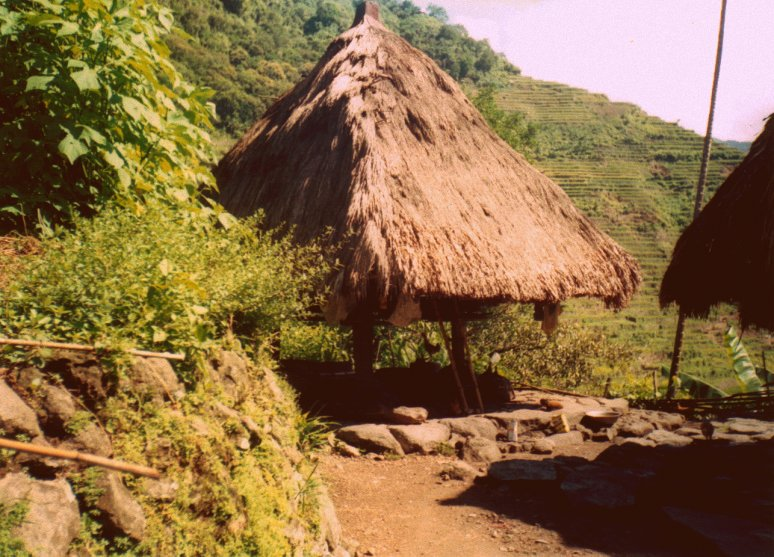
A traditional Ifugao house with the Batad rice terraces in the background

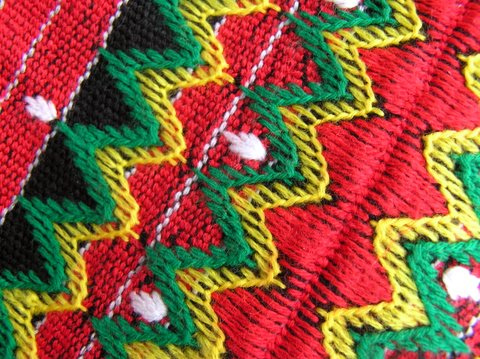
Fabric weaved from Ifugao

Based on the 2020 census survey, the population previously categorized broadly as Ifugao is now primarily identified as Tuwali at 35.43% (73,383) and Ayangan at 33% (68,360) of the total provincial household population of 207,130. Other significant ethnic groups include the Ilocanos at 12.88% (26,677), Kalanguya at 12.44% (25,776), and Kankanaey at 1.54% (3,184).

=== Languages ===
The main languages of Ifugao are the 4 languages of Ifugao dialect continuum: Tuwali, Amganad, Mayaoyao, Batad; Keley-i Kalanguya; and Ilocano.

=== Religion ===
The Ifugao people have an indigenous religion unique to their traditional culture, and highly significant to the preservation of their life ways and valued traditions. They believe in the existence of thousands of gods, which may enter specific sacred objects such as the bul-ul.

Roman Catholicism has a growing influence in the province with approximately 60% of the population being converted by missionaries. In most areas, especially at the east and south of the province, indigenous traditions have degraded due to the influx of Christianity. In 2014, the Apostolic Vicariate of Bontoc-Lagawe recorded a 61.5% Roman Catholic adherence. The most significant religion other than Roman Catholicism is Protestantism that make up 20%-30% of the population and are mostly found in the central and south-western parts of this province. Other religions includes animism.

== Wet rice cultivation and ritual feasting ==
Shifting to wet rice cultivation is one factor that intensified the social ranking that was already present among the Ifugao society. Those who adopted wet rice cultivation were able to consolidate political resources. “In Ifugao, the adoption of wet-rice agriculture is at the forefront in discussions regarding social ranking vis-à-vis prestige economy.” The Ifugao social status is based on their rice lands and ability to sponsor feasts. One reason being is that an individual needs to be skilled in mobilizing rice terraces, and because rice terraces require labor-intensive work. Stephen Acabado states that since the village was increasing in population, the shift to wet rice cultivation, increase of exotic goods procurement, and finally increase in the distribution of ritual animals indicates “political elaboration as a response to Spanish conquest.” In addition, according to Queeny G. Lapeña and Stephen B. Acabado, in order to successfully resist against a colonizing power it requires a constructive military organization within a complete polity. The Spanish took conquest of the Magat Valley and between 1600 CE and 1700 CE it drove the Ifugao to strategically resettle in the interior of the Cordillera Mountains. Wet-rice agriculture was adopted soon after, and extensive rice terraces were built. This was a subsistence shift for the Ifugao because they cultivated taro before the start of the wet rice cultivation. The author emphasizes that the Ifugao people kept their culture and identity alive by spending large amounts of time in rice fields, since they treated them as ritual areas to “reinforce community solidarity."

Furthermore, archeologists state that there was an increase of pig consumption. This increase had to do with the increase in ritual feasting. In the Old Kiyyangan Village, there were morphometric evidence of the vast increase in pig consumption. Stephen Acabado states that since the village was increasing in population the shift to wet rice cultivation, increase of exotic goods procurement, and finally increase in the distribution of ritual animals indicates “political elaboration as a response to Spanish conquest”. In the article Resistance through rituals: The role of Philippine “native pig” (Sus scrofa) in Ifugao feasting and socio-political organization, the authors conclude that domesticated pigs were intertwined in the maintenance of a rank social order that came into view from the Ifugao's resistance against Spanish colonialism.

The domestication of pigs and terrace cultivation within the Ifugao region provides a perfect scenario of how societies respond to challenges and needs in their immediate environment. Since wild pigs were considered unfit for rituals, emphasis was placed towards the domestication pigs, which illustrated an individual's social status. The bigger the feast, the higher regard a person was likely to receive from both kin and non-kin members as the ceremony would involve the sharing of sacrificed pig meat. The relationship between the elites who in this case owned the land and the lower social classes worsened during the period after the Spanish conquest. Social immobility became more apparent, since to have enough rice to trade for a pig, one would need to own a rice terrace and vice versa. The cultural value attached to the pig and rice cultivation guaranteed the survival of the communities, in spite of moving to the highlands as they migrated further from the invading Spanish. The importance of rituals and ceremonies meant that people were pushed into practicing pig domestication not merely as a source of food, but as a way of honoring their culture. On the other hand, the cultivation of rice on the terraces required extensive organization of labor, which led to the creation of socio-political shifts.

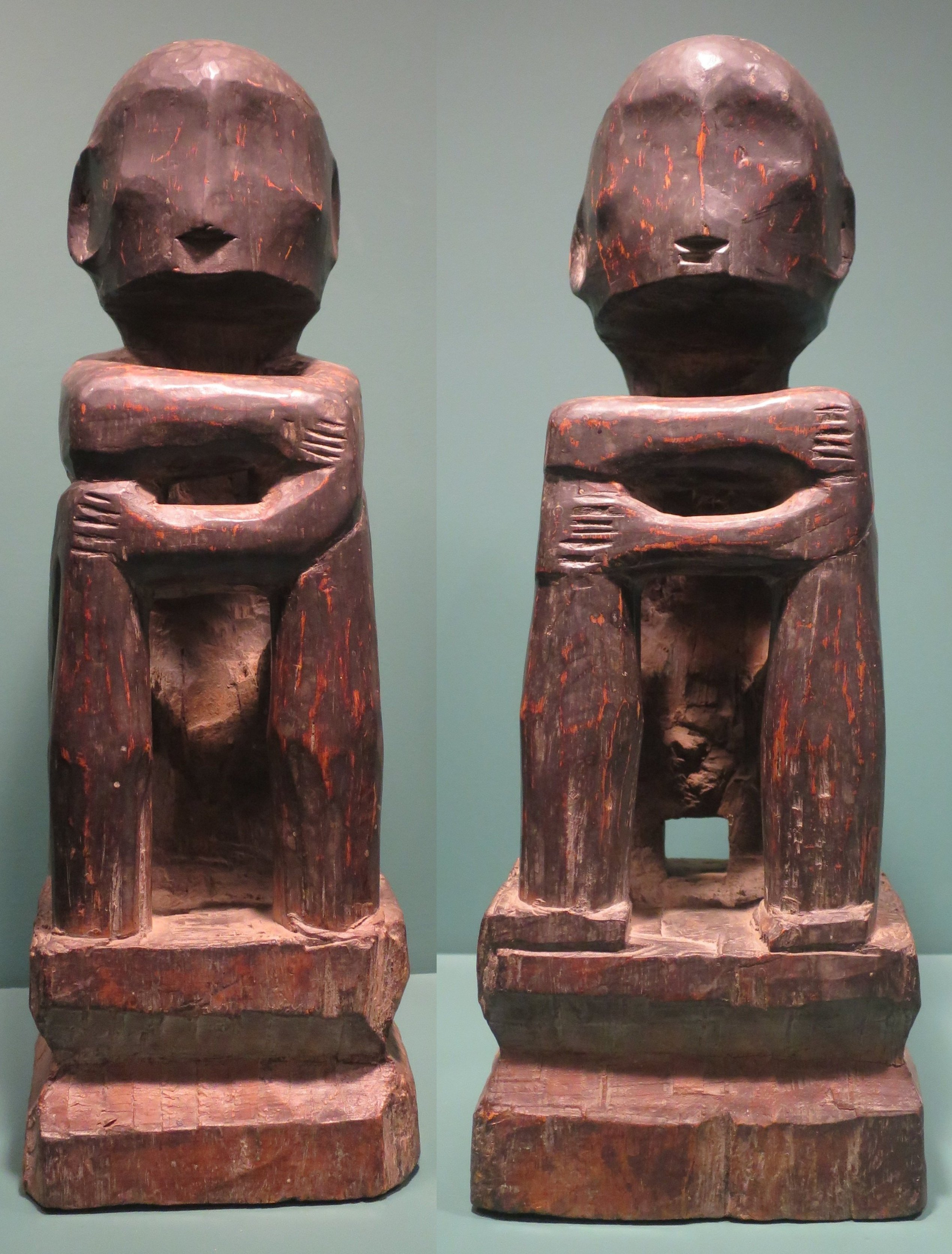
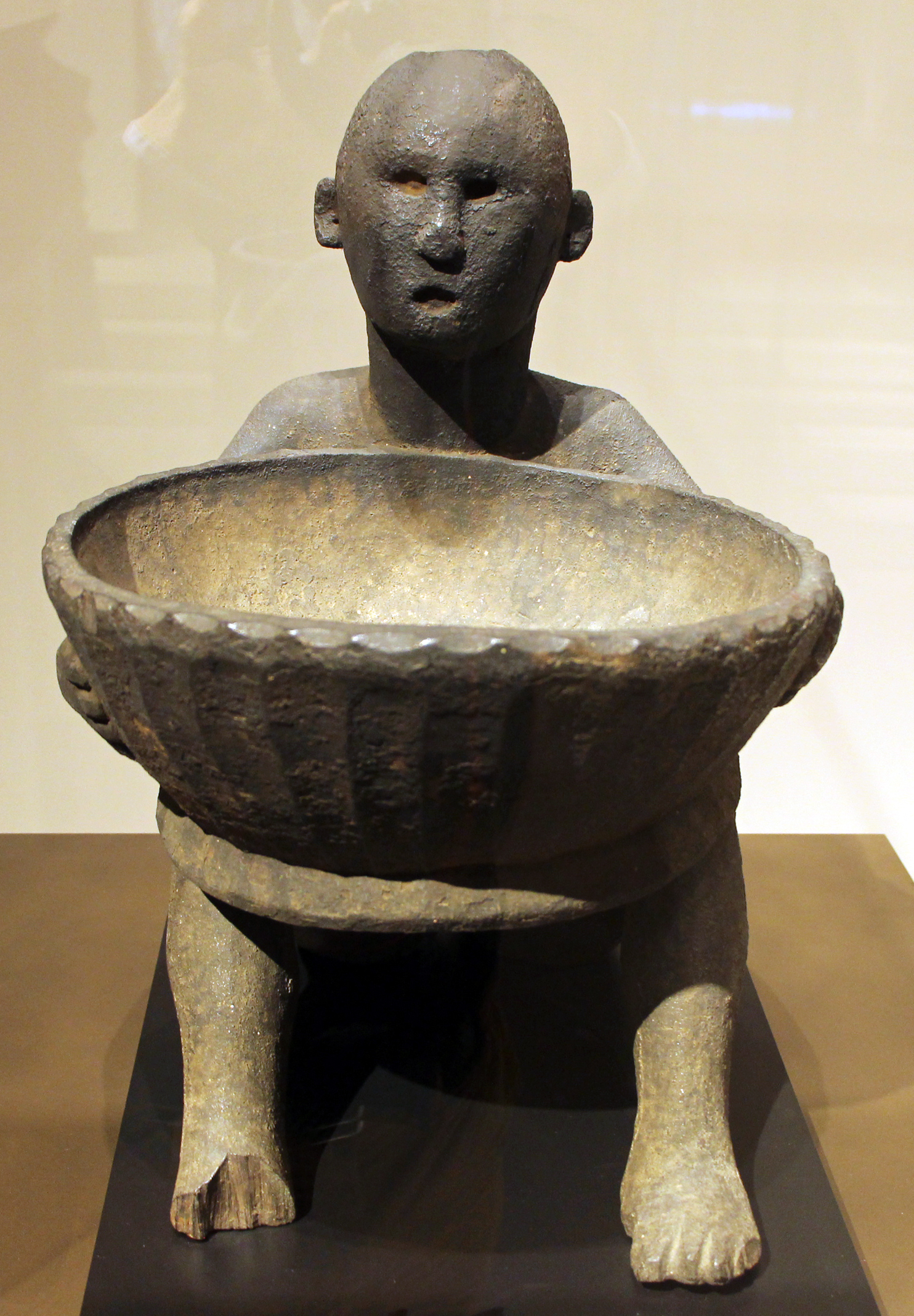
Bululs, rice granary guardian deities from Ifugao

== Rice culture ==
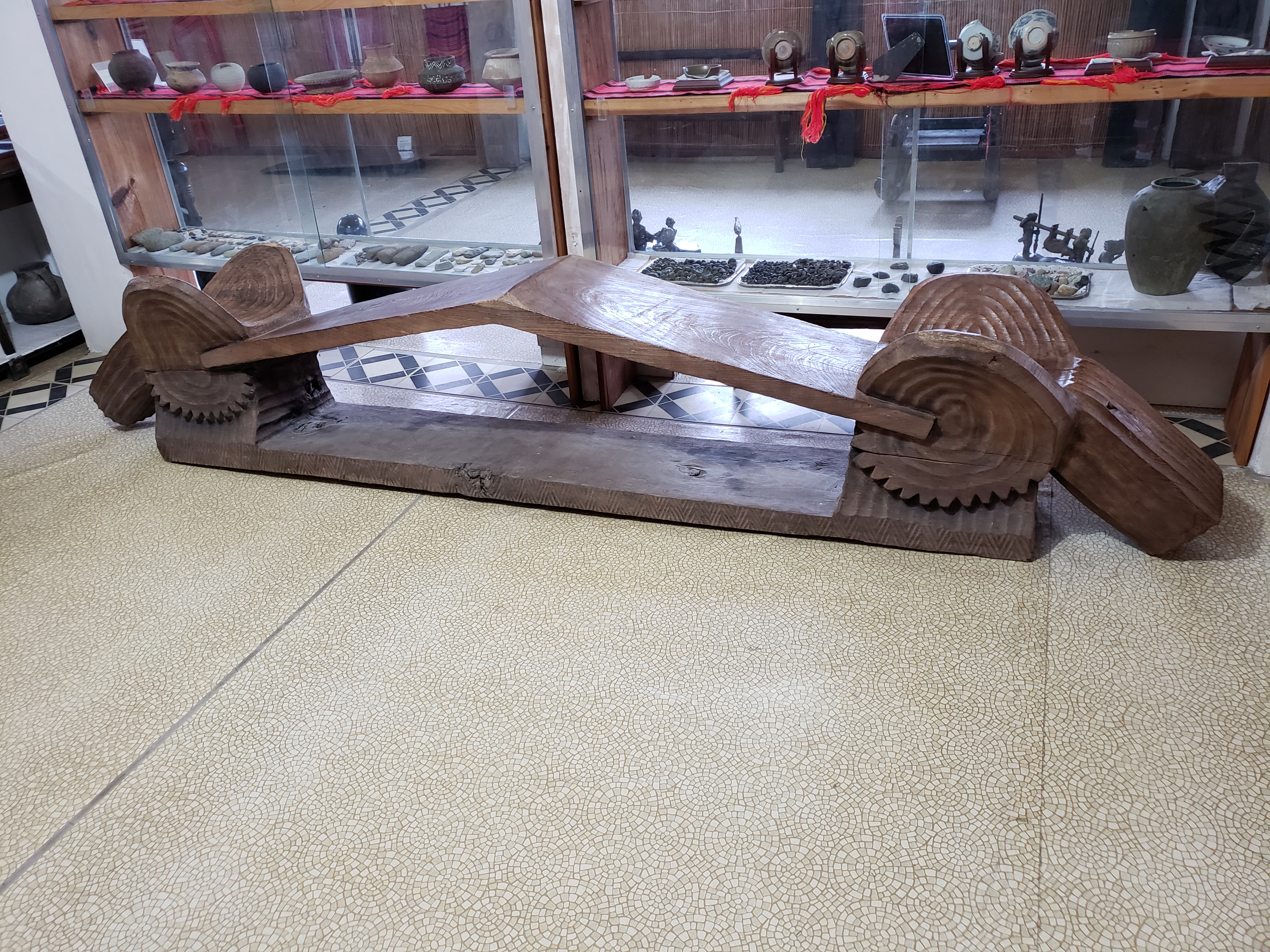
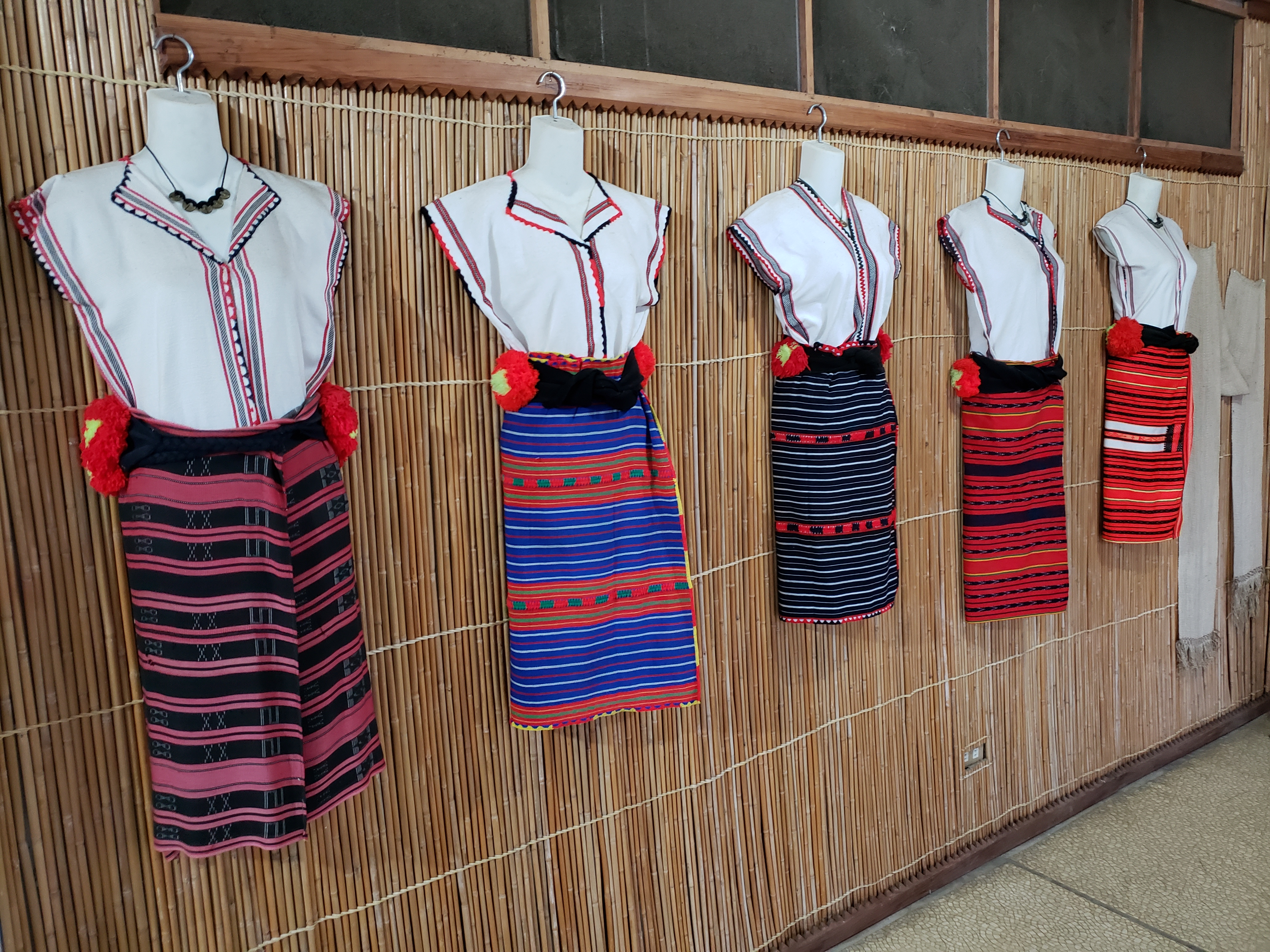
Hagabi (left) and native dress (right) in Banaue Museum

The Spanish first described the Ifugao rice terraces in 1801. Though as William Scott notes, "These impressive stone-walled fields, irrigated for both rice and taro, had been known from the time of the first expeditions in to Kiangan in the 1750s..."

Ifugao culture revolves around rice, which is considered a prestige crop. There is an elaborate and complex array of rice culture feasts inextricably linked with taboos and intricate agricultural rites, from rice cultivation to rice consumption. Harvest season calls for grandiose thanksgiving feasts, while the concluding harvest rites tungo or tungul (the day of rest) entail a strict taboo of any agricultural work. Partaking of the rice wine (bayah), rice cakes, and moma (mixture of several herbs, powdered snail shell and betel nut/arecoline which is used as a chewing gum to the Ifugaos) is an indelible practice during the festivities and ritual activities. Agricultural terracing and farming are the principal means of livelihood. Their social status is measured by the number of rice field granaries, family heirlooms, gold earrings, and carabaos (water buffaloes). Prestige is also conferred through time and tradition.

A prayer is said by an elderly woman when harvest begins, directed towards Cabunian, the goddess of rice. Then, a protective prayer is said before the rice is placed in the granary.

The Ifugao solar calendar included a 365-day year, broken down into 13 months of 28 days each, plus one extra day.

Ifugao culture values kinship, family ties, religious and cultural beliefs. Ifugao are unique among all ethnic groups in the mountain province for their narrative literature such as the hudhud, an epic dealing with hero ancestors sung in a poetic manner. Also unique to the Ifugao is their woodcarving art, most notably the carved granary guardians bulul and the prestige bench of the upper class, the hagabi. Their textiles are renowned for their sheer beauty, colorful blankets and clothing woven on looms.

Traditional attire for male Ifugaos consists of a simple G-string. Ifugao women, on the contrary, wear tapis, a wraparound skirt.

== Economy ==
Poverty incidence of Ifugao (%)

Source: Philippine Statistics Authority

The economy of Ifugao is fundamentally anchored in agriculture, specifically wet-rice cultivation supported by its world-renowned, labor-intensive, and traditionally maintained rice terraces. While subsistence rice farming and sweet potato cultivation remain crucial, the local economy has transitioned from pure self-sufficiency to a mixed, simple commodity production system, integrating cash crops like vegetables, coffee, and fruit trees. Furthermore, the economy is heavily supported by tourism revolving around the UNESCO-listed terraces, alongside traditional home industries such as weaving, metalwork, and intricate wood carving. Due to the need for monetary income, many locals also rely on remittances from family members working in cities or abroad, creating an economic structure that balances traditional ecological knowledge with market-driven activities.

== UNESCO recognitions in Ifugao ==
UNESCO has inscribed two Ifugao elements in the Representative List of the Intangible Cultural Heritage of Humanity in 2008 and 2015, respectively. UNESCO has also inscribed one Ifugao site with five properties in the World Heritage Site in 1995.

=== Rice Terraces of the Philippine Cordilleras ===
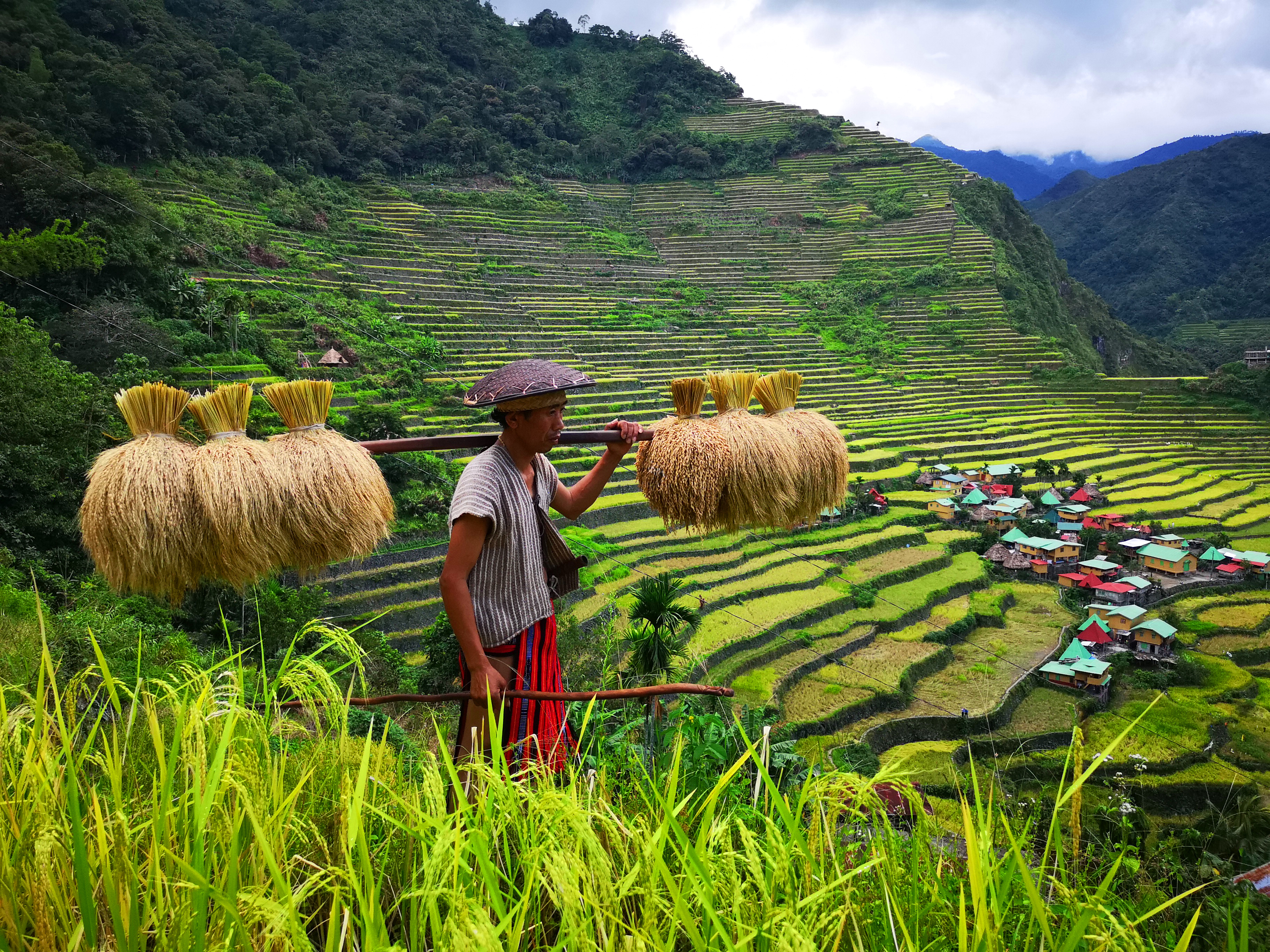
An Ifugao man harvesting rice at the Batad Rice Terraces.

In 1995, the Rice Terraces of the Philippine Cordilleras was inscribed in the UNESCO World Heritage List. UNESCO states:

"For 2,000 years, the rice fields of the Ifugao have on the contours of the mountains. The fruit of knowledge handed down from one generation to the next, and the expression of sacred traditions and a delicate social balance, they have helped to create a landscape of that expresses the harmony between humankind and the environment."

The inscription has five sites: the Batad Rice Terraces, Bangaan Rice Terraces (both in Banaue), Mayoyao Rice Terraces (in Mayoyao), Hungduan Rice Terraces (in Hungduan) and Nagacadan Rice Terraces (in Kiangan), all in the Ifugao Province, the Philippines. The Banaue Rice Terraces are not included in the inscription, but may be included through an extension nomination to UNESCO, along with other rice terraces sites in other Philippine Cordillera provinces.

=== Hudhud Chants of the Ifugao ===
In 2001, the Hudhud ni Aliguyon (or Hudhud Chants of the Ifugao) became one of the first 11 Masterpieces of the Oral and Intangible Heritage of Humanity in 2001. The element was inscribed in the Representative List of the Intangible Cultural Heritage of Humanity in 2008. UNESCO describes the element as follows:

The Hudhud consists of narrative chants traditionally performed by the Ifugao community, which is well known for its rice terraces extending over the highlands of the northern island of the Philippine archipelago. It is practised during the rice sowing season, at harvest time and at funeral wakes and rituals. Thought to have originated before the seventh century, the Hudhud comprises more than 200 chants, each divided into 40 episodes. A complete recitation may last several days. Since the Ifugao’s culture is matrilineal, the wife generally takes the main part in the chants, and her brother occupies a higher position than her husband. The language of the stories abounds in figurative expressions and repetitions and employs metonymy, metaphor and onomatopoeia, rendering transcription very difficult. Thus, there are very few written expressions of this tradition. The chant tells about ancestral heroes, customary law, religious beliefs and traditional practices, and reflects the importance of rice cultivation. The narrators, mainly elderly women, hold a key position in the community, both as historians and preachers. The Hudhud epic is chanted alternately by the first narrator and a choir, employing a single melody for all the verses. The conversion of the Ifugao to Catholicism has weakened their traditional culture. Furthermore, the Hudhud is linked to the manual harvesting of rice, which is now mechanized. Although the rice terraces are listed as a World Heritage Site, the number of growers has been in constant decline.The few remaining narrators, who are already very old, need to be supported in their efforts to transmit their knowledge and to raise awareness among young people.

=== Tugging Games and Ritual: Punnuk of the Ifugao ===
The Punnuk of the Ifugao was inscribed in the Representative List of the Intangible Cultural Heritage of Humanity in 2015 under the multinational inscription of the Tugging Rituals and Games element.
