= Asipulo =

Municipality in Ifugao, Philippines

- Municipality
- Municipality of Asipulo
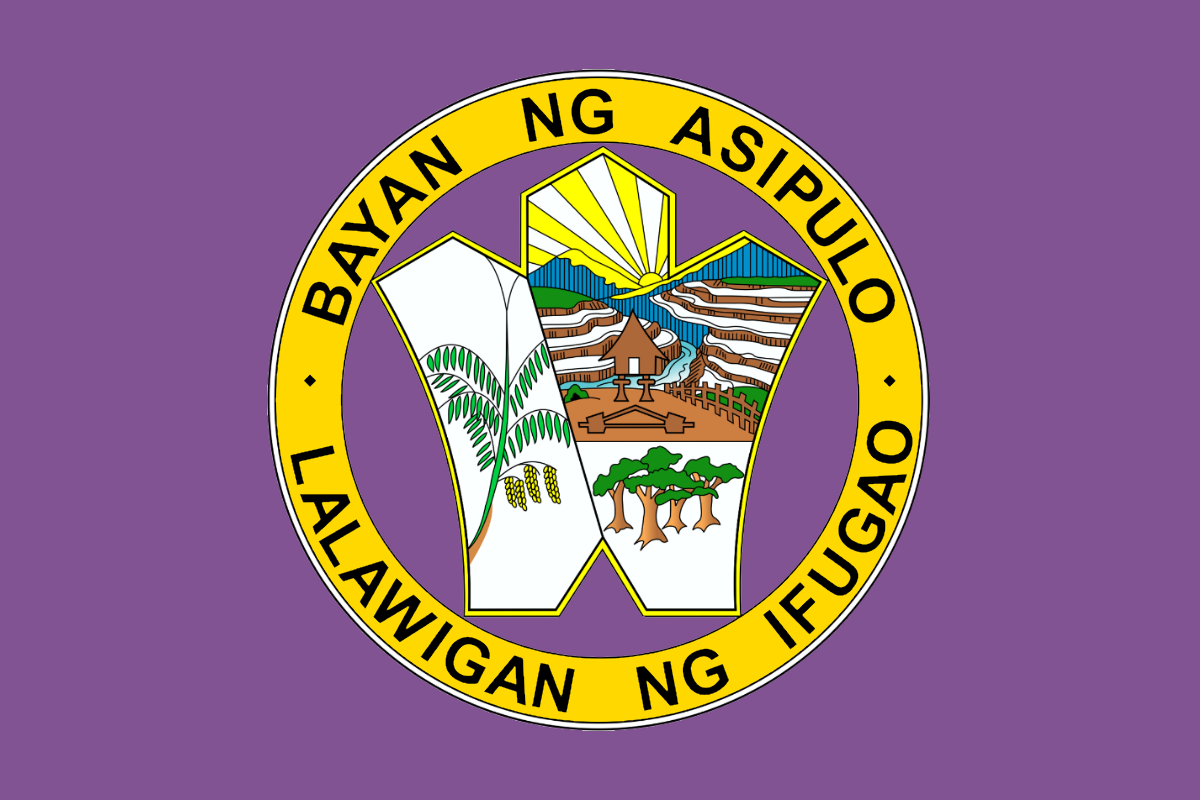
- Flag Seal

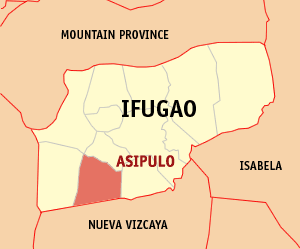
- Map of Ifugao with Asipulo highlighted
- Interactive map of Asipulo
- Location within the Philippines
- Coordinates: 16°43′15″N 121°04′10″E
- Country: Philippines
- Region: Cordillera Administrative Region
- Province: Ifugao
- District: Lone district
- Barangays: 10 (see Barangays)

Government
  - Type: Sangguniang Bayan
  - Mayor: Archie Lee A. Quindo
  - Vice Mayor: Clarence P. Bahingawan
  - Representative: Solomon Chungalao
  - Municipal Council: Members: Leonardo M. Ullanggi; Eddie A. Dinongon; Gualberto B. Tayaban; Wilma W. Ullay; Juan A. Piggangay Jr.; Sanny D. Buhong; Robert P. Ullani; Nathaniel D. Dupingay
  - Electorate: 8,312 voters (2025)

Area
  - Total: 182.87 km^{2} (70.61 sq mi)
- Elevation: 1,063 m (3,488 ft)
- Highest elevation: 1,735 m (5,692 ft)
- Lowest elevation: 558 m (1,831 ft)

Population (2024 census)
  - Total: 16,088
  - Density: 87.975/km^{2} (227.85/sq mi)
  - Households: 3,327

Economy
  - Income class: 4th municipal income class
  - Poverty incidence: 12.33% (2023)
  - Revenue: ₱ 140.1 million (2024)
  - Assets: ₱ 290.9 million (2024)
  - Expenditure: ₱ 140.9 million (2024)
  - Liabilities: ₱ 47.77 million (2024)

Service provider
  - Electricity: Ifugao Electric Cooperative (IFELCO)
- Time zone: UTC+8 (PST)
- ZIP code: 3610
- PSGC: 1402711000
- IDD : area code: +63 (0)74
- Native languages: Ifugao; Tuwali; Ilocano; Tagalog
- Website: www.asipulo.gov.ph

Asipulo, officially the Municipality of Asipulo is a municipality in the province of Ifugao, Philippines. According to the 2024 census, it has a population of 16,088 people.

== History ==
The town, formerly part of Kiangan, was incorporated as a separate municipality pursuant to Republic Act No. 7173, ratified on January 13, 1992.

== Geography ==
Asipulo is situated 13 kilometres (8 mi) from the provincial capital Lagawe, and 363 kilometres (226 mi) from the country's capital city of Manila.

=== Barangays ===
Asipulo is politically subdivided into 10 barangays. Each barangay consists of puroks and some have sitios.

- Amduntog
- Antipolo
- Camandag
- Cawayan
- Haliap
- Liwon
- Namal
- Nungawa
- Panubtuban
- Pula

=== Climate ===
Climate data for Asipulo, Ifugao
Month	Jan	Feb	Mar	Apr	May	Jun	Jul	Aug	Sep	Oct	Nov	Dec	Year
Mean daily maximum °C (°F)	23 (73)	24 (75)	26 (79)	28 (82)	27 (81)	27 (81)	26 (79)	26 (79)	26 (79)	26 (79)	25 (77)	24 (75)	26 (78)
Mean daily minimum °C (°F)	16 (61)	17 (63)	18 (64)	20 (68)	21 (70)	21 (70)	21 (70)	21 (70)	21 (70)	19 (66)	18 (64)	17 (63)	19 (67)
Average precipitation mm (inches)	38 (1.5)	57 (2.2)	77 (3.0)	141 (5.6)	390 (15.4)	355 (14.0)	426 (16.8)	441 (17.4)	426 (16.8)	259 (10.2)	97 (3.8)	57 (2.2)	2,764 (108.9)
Average rainy days	10.4	12.1	15.4	20.4	26.7	27.1	28.7	28.0	26.4	19.9	14.1	12.3	241.5
Source: Meteoblue

== Demographics ==
Population census of Asipulo
Year	Pop.	±% p.a.
1995	9,964	—
2000	12,294	+4.61%
2007	13,340	+1.13%
2010	14,403	+2.83%
2015	15,261	+1.11%
2020	15,963	+0.95%
2024	16,088	+0.19%
Source: Philippine Statistics Authority

In the 2024 census, the population of Asipulo was 16,088 people, with a density of 88 inhabitants per square kilometre or 230 inhabitants per square mile.

== Economy ==
Poverty incidence of Asipulo (%)

Source: Philippine Statistics Authority

Asipulo's economy is heavily centered on agriculture. Rice and coffee production serve as the major agricultural livelihood of Asipulo.

Asipulo is currently constructing the Lamut-Asipulo Hydroelectric Project and the Likud 2 Hydroelectric Power Project.

== Government ==
=== Local government ===
Asipulo, belonging to the lone congressional district of the province of Ifugao, is governed by a mayor designated as its local chief executive and by a municipal council as its legislative body in accordance with the Local Government Code. The mayor, vice mayor, and the councilors are elected directly by the people through an election which is being held every three years.

=== Elected officials ===
Members of the Municipal Council (2025–2028)
Position	Name
Congressman	Solomon R. Chungalao
Mayor	Archie Lee A. Quindo
Vice-Mayor	Clarence P. Bahingawan
Councilors	Sanny D. Buhong
Councilors	Eddie A. Dinongon
Councilors	Leonardo M. Ullanggi
Councilors	Nathaniel D. Dupingay
Councilors	Wilma W. Ullay
Councilors	Juan A. Piggangay Jr.
Councilors	Robert P. Ullani
Councilors	Gualberto B. Tayaban

== Tourism ==
=== JCampbell Park ===
The JCampbell Park or Julia Campbell Agroforest Memorial Eco-Park, is an eco-park located in Barangay Pula in this town. The camp is dedicated in memory of Julia Campbell, a U.S. Peace Corps volunteer working in the Philippines and was murdered in the area in 2007 on her trek to the Batad Rice Terraces.

=== Other attractions ===
Mount Kesimelan is offering scenic rainforest trails and views of local watersheds. The annual Kesimelan Trek is a hiking event in Mount Kesimelan that features as a major eco-tourism and cultural highlight during Asipulo's annual festival celebrations. Bagyuna Cave is a newly highlighted natural attraction located in Barangay Pula.

== Education ==
The Asipulo Schools District Office governs all educational institutions within the municipality. It oversees the management and operations of all private and public, from primary to secondary schools.

=== Primary and elementary schools ===
- Ammoweg Elementary School
- Antipolo Elementary School
- Asipulo Central School
- Asipulo Central School - Annex
- Bukig Elementary School
- Camandag Elementary School
- Cawayan Elementary School
- Cawayan PS - Annex (Alehwagon)
- Duli Elementary School
- Duli Elementary School Extension
- Haliap Elementary School
- Lab-ong Primary School
- Liwon Elementary School
- Maloy Primary School
- Namal Elementary School
- Nangkatengey Elementary School
- Numpaling Elementary School
- Nungawa Primary School
- Panubtuban Elementary School
- Pula Elementary School
- Pulpog Primary School

=== Secondary schools ===
- Asipulo National High School
- Camandag National High School
- Haliap National High School
- Natcak National High School
