= Bulul =

Ritual ancestor statue

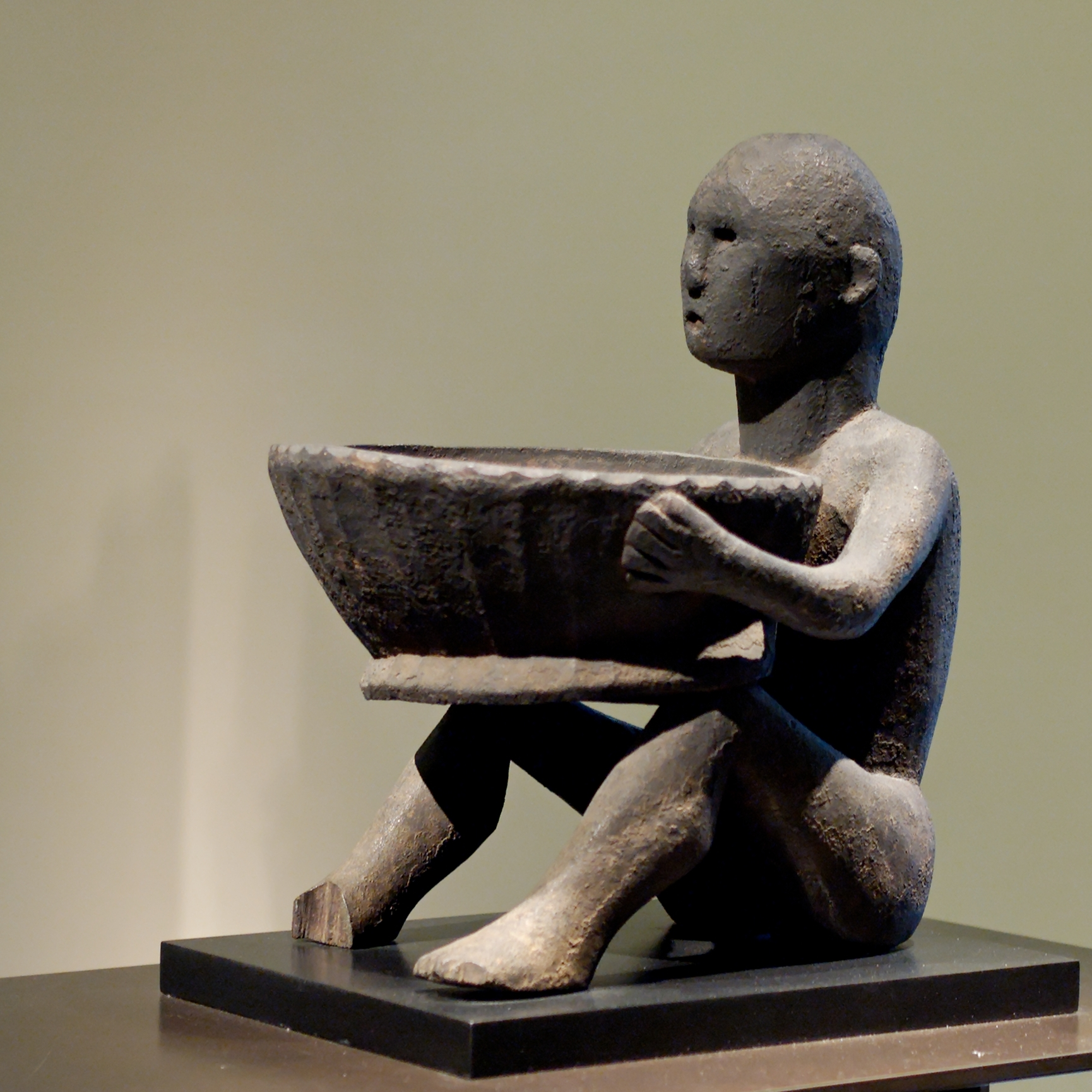
15th century bulul with a pamahan (ceremonial bowl) in the Louvre Museum

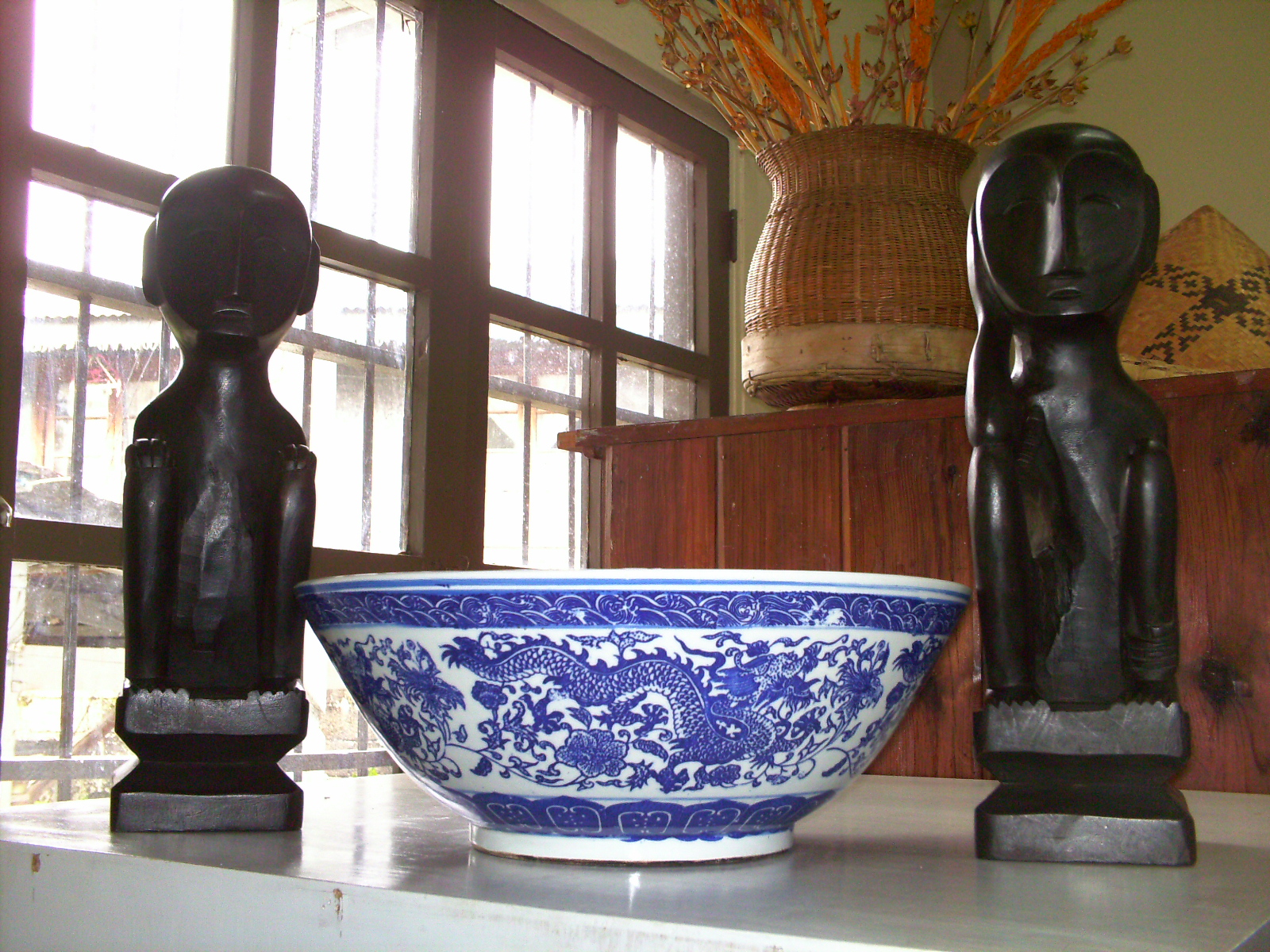
Wooden images of the ancestors in a museum in Bontoc, Mountain Province, Philippines

Bulul, also known as bu-lul or tinagtaggu, is a carved wooden figure used to guard the rice crop by the Ifugao (and their sub-tribe Kalanguya) people of northern Luzon.

The sculptures are highly stylized representations of ancestors and are thought to gain power and wealth from the presence of the ancestral spirit. The Ifugao are particularly noted for their skill in carving bulul.

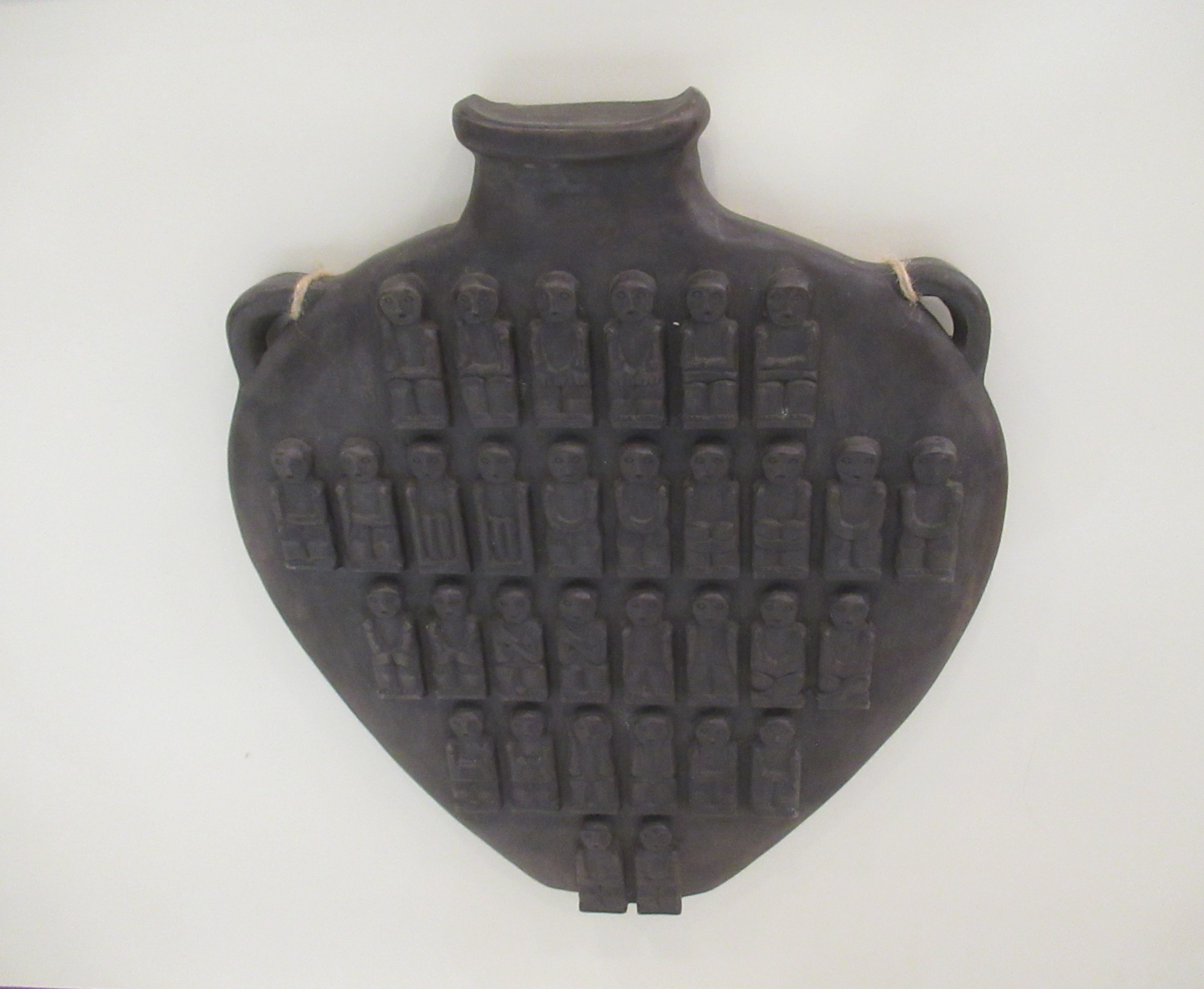
Ifugao people rice gods or deities in a museum

== Use ==
Bu-luls are used in ceremonies associated with rice production and with healing. The creation of a bulul involves alwen bulul ritual by a priest to ensure that the statue gains power.

The bu-lul is treated with care and respect to avoid the risk of the spirits of the ancestors bringing sickness. The figures are placed together with the rice in the house or granaries to bring a plentiful harvest. The bulul is important to Ifugaos because they believe they can protect and multiply the rice and help make the harvest abundant.

== Form ==
Male and female bulul statues are often found together, with sex-related symbols such as the mortar for the female and pestle for the male. Male bulul may sometimes be depicted with loincloth, and females with tapis (wrap skirts), earrings and anklets. Although the form varies, the bulul is commonly represented as seated on the ground, with arms crossed over his upraised knees. The bulul has a simplified form, and is traditionally carved from narra or ipil wood. The bulul is touched by hands dipped in the blood of a chicken or pig in a ritual called tunod during the rice planting season. Over time the blood imparts a dark color to the figures, overlaid with a patina of grease from food offerings. Bulul are handed down to the first child of a family. Typically the older statues have beetle holes made by insects in the granary.

Bulul are nowadays mostly manufactured for the tourist trade, but a local family may buy such a bulul and use it for ceremonial purposes, thus in a sense adding authenticity. However, an Ifugao former "mumbaki" (shaman) stated that the last traditional rituals were held in the 1960s. Some of the carvers, such as Rey Paz Contreras, have become well-known artists, with their work exhibited and sold widely in the Western world. Contreras uses discarded wood from the railways for his carvings of bulul and other anito (guardian deity) figures.

== See also ==
- Larauan and Likha - Tagalog counterparts of bulul
