= Prehistoric beads in the Philippines =

The Philippines is an archipelago located in Southeast Asia and consists of 7,641 islands. Prehistoric beads are among the most significant resources deriving from the human past. They are artifacts that inform individuals about archaeological records. Beads play a vital role in Asian lives, since they were utilized as human markers to indicate a territory; moreover, prehistoric beads were significant for ancestors as well as the people who occupied the identical territory. For instance, if beads are perished or destroyed, they can be recovered archaeologically due to their durability, which allows for the preservation of these resources. Furthermore, several of the decorative pieces and tools that they possess, as well as their culture, seem to reflect this maritime characteristic. Due to the fact that beads are transportable, compact in size, and appealing to the eye, they can essentially be discovered all over the world. Tools such as choppers made of shells as well as decorative pieces like shell beads are common in Southeast Asian archaeological records due to this characteristic. Various sites have been found to contain shell beads, including Sucgang Barrio in Bohol; Sibale Island, near Surigao; Suluan island, south of Samar; Lagen Island in Palawan; and Camotes Islands.

Various studies have been conducted on these shell beads. Studies on the method of cutting, use, location and whether these were taken whole or broken apart were used as characteristics to define these shell beads. It is also of note that shell beads are of different characteristics throughout the archipelago of the Philippines. Research shows that most of the shell beads found in sites were actually cut beads. This shows that there was a significant development of technique and method to be able to design these shell beads, as modification after the cutting process would have been substantially difficult. Francis discussed in his study of the Philippine shell bead collection, that the beads may have been around since the Late Neolithic period and were later replaced by glass and other inorganic beads from about 200 BCE – 1200 CE.

== Materials ==
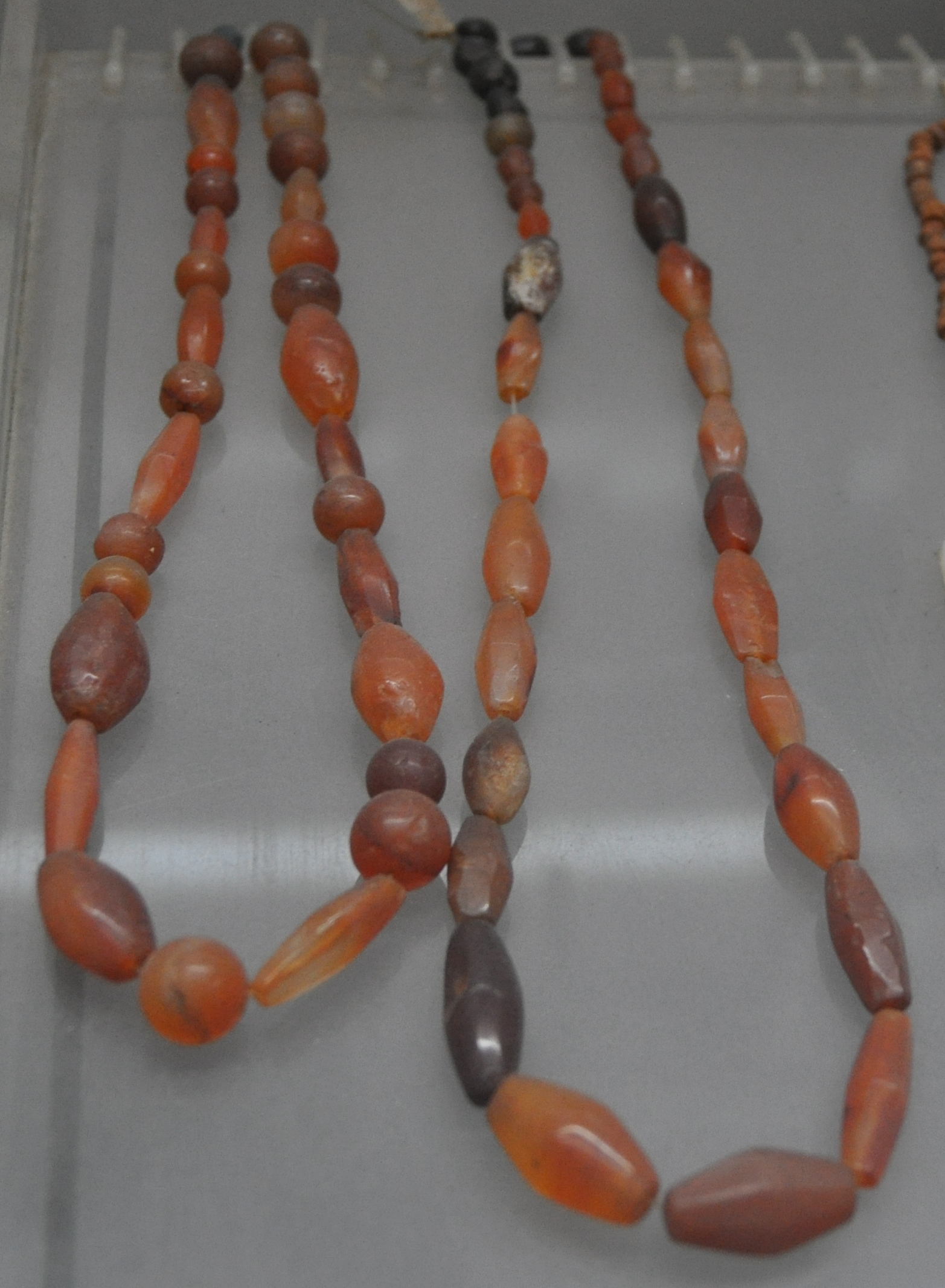
Agate Heirloom Beads

According to Carter, among the materials for bead making, glass was the most extensively used material in the ancient past. This is due to the fact that glass is highly durable and preservable, and contains a vast amount of shapes and colors. Glass is the leading bead material that is utilized and in fact, it was invented around 2500 B.C. in the Middle East. As Francis implies, “the first indigenous glass of Asia was found in Chinese and Indian beads dating from the eleventh century B. C.” Furthermore, this allows for archaeologists to study the migration of people in addition to the developments of ideas, because history is still not understood.

== Purpose ==
Beads are a great indication of social status and the owner's wealth in the community. According to Carter, beads are linked to the social, economic, and aesthetic components of the society and culture. For example, in the Village of Lubo in Kalinga Province, heirloom beads are passed down for generations and are understood to signify an individual's status. As Carter implies, heirloom beads are personal adornments, where the attractiveness of the wearer is enhanced. Additionally, heirloom beads were worn at the time of a funeral, which also indicated the social position of the certain community. For instance, the Martin Family from Kiangan, Ifugao, wore contemporary glass and stone beads that were precious and sacred to the family. According to Yakal, Ifugao heirloom beads are prestigious goods that were limited to the Ifugao community of wealth; moreover, such beads were solely utilized for ritualistic occasions such as: funerals, weddings, and rice harvest festivals and signified respect. Additionally, beads serve as a measure of value and can signify commodities, which also contribute to mediums of exchange because they can be used as money.

== Discovered Locations ==
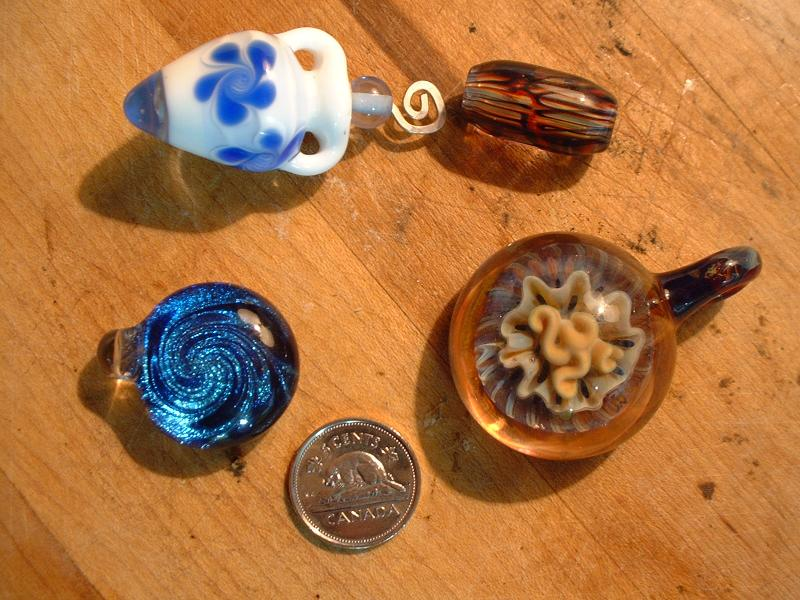
An image of glass beads

These symbolic beads have been discovered in many different regions within Southeast Asia. Some of the locations in which these beads were found are: Central Thailand sites such as Ban Don Tha Phet, a Peninsular Thailand site, Khao Sam Kaeo, Coastal Vietnamese sites of the Sa Huynh culture (Sa Huynh, Giong Ca Vo, Phu Hoa) and, in the Philippines, the Tabon caves in the Palawan island. Additionally, beads were encountered in the Manunggul Cave Chamber A in Palawan, an island in the South China Sea nearby to Sulu.

== Classification of Beads ==
=== Period 1 ===
Beads are classified into two periods, each featuring a different type of interaction. Period 1 (earlier period) beads corresponds to the last centuries BC, and Period 2 corresponds to the first millennium AD. The character of Period 1 beads suggest well-established exchange relationships between South-east Asian and Indian populations due to the high volume of ornaments discovered within South-east Asia, as well as their quality demonstrated by the use of skilled Indian technologies. These relationships are assumed to have dated back to the first half of the first millennium BC. Other prestigious goods possessed by individuals within these communities were codified ornaments. Some examples of these ornaments are Dong Son drums, Sa Huynh ornaments and bronze knobbed ware.

=== Period 2 ===
During Period 2, manufacturing centers began to develop in South-east Asia which began producing a lower quality of beads. Indian manufactured beads continued to expand geographically and reach certain locations in South-east Asia. Although coast communities did not participate in the exchange of high status imported objects with highland communities, there were known to have provided the supplies for manufacturing these objects.

== Southeast Asian Bead Trade ==
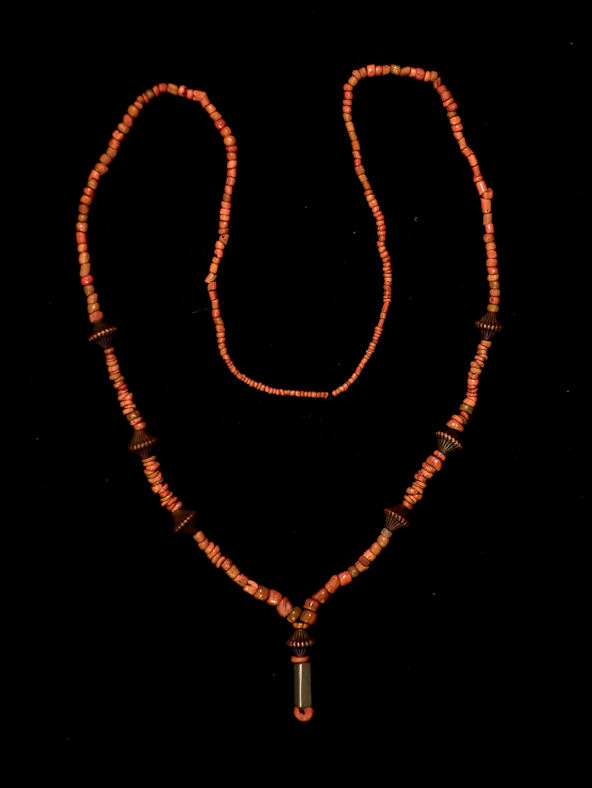
An example of drawn beads, formally known as Indo-Pacific Beads

Glover and Henderson place the date of glass bead trade in Southeast Asia at no later than 400 BCE. Alastair Lamb states that the most common type of bead for around that time was the Indo-Pacific beads. According to Francis, the beads could be named “Indo Pacific Monochrome Drawn Glass Beads”. These Indo-Pacific beads can be found to occur everywhere in Southeast Asia.

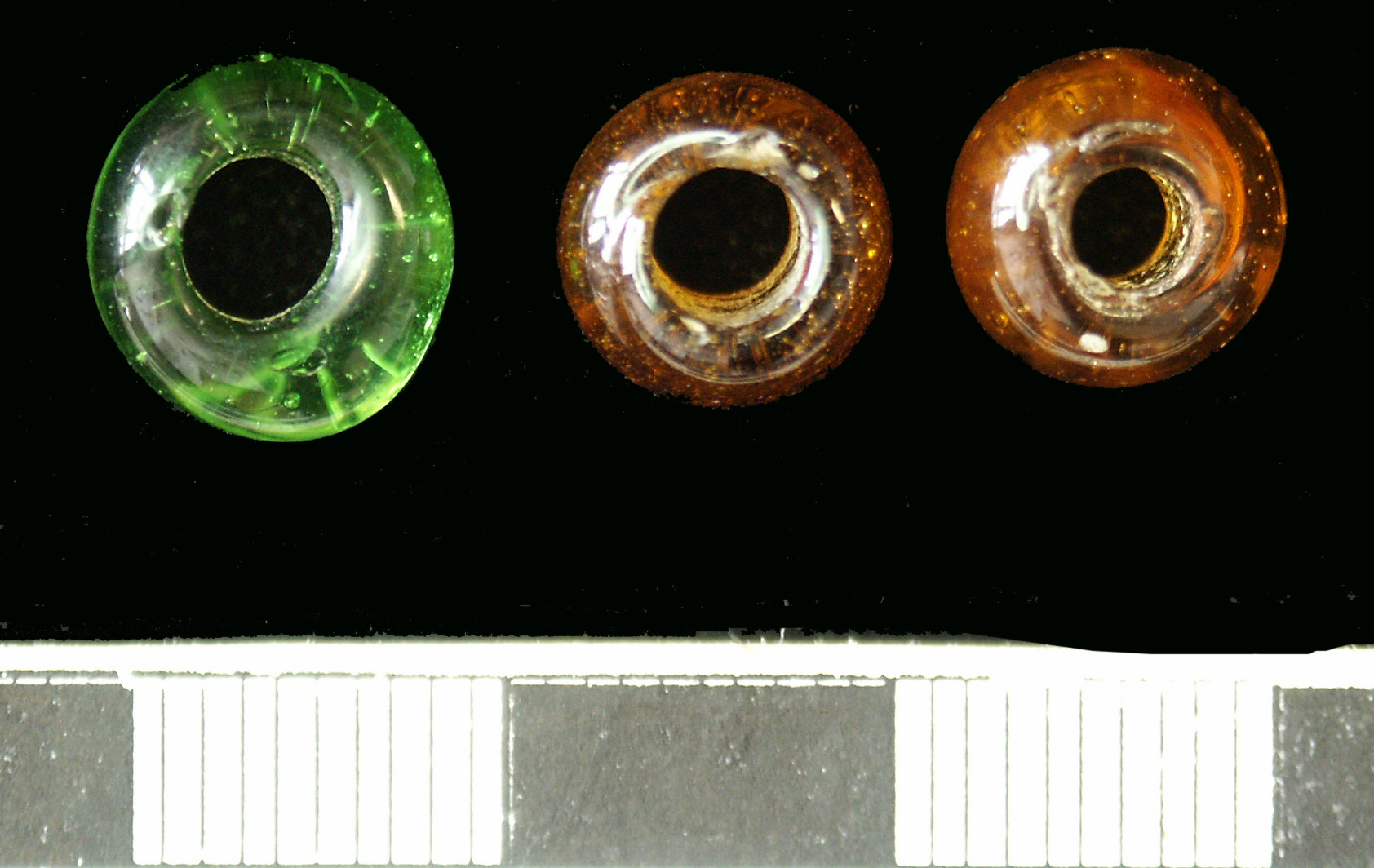
Figure of three wound beads that could be connected by a wire

Other than these, there could be found at that time, Chinese beads (which were traded generally either by non-Han Chinese, other Southeast Asians, or Westerners depending on the time period), Muslim beads, Java beads, and Indian beads. Clues as to the nature of bead trade in South East Asia could be found in the Pandanan Shipwreck, placing the history of the finds here to about the 15th century CE. It can be seen from the shipwreck that tradeware from Vietnam, Thailand and China were being passed around to other Southeast Asian nations. Early trade centers such as Sungai Mas in Malaysia give us a clue as to where trade of beads may have originated from or where they developed. In fact, studies by Cayron point to the fact that the beads found in the Pandanan shipwreck actually originated from Sungai Mas. Trading routes taken were generally inland to avoid pirates and thus, pillaging of their cargo. Sarkar discusses Wheatley's eleven main trade routes: "The three Pagodas between Moulmein and Tavoy, and the three Cedis route; the Tenasserim River route in Burma; the Kra Isthmus route; the Takuapa River route in Thailand; the Trang River rout in Thailand; the Kedah-Patani route; the Perak-Petani route; the Kelantan-Malacca route by way of the Panarikan in Malaysia; the Pahang-Malacca route by way of the Panarikan; the Sembrong route; and the Bernam-Pahang route."

== Types of Glass Beads in Southeast Asia ==
=== Drawn Beads ===
The various ways beads are made is essential to their study and proper categorization. Two significant types of South-east Asian beads are Drawn Beads and Wound Beads. Drawn beads are made of glass tube, as they are pulled out of a glass batch then cut into short pieces, typically held under strong heat to smooth out their sharp edges. These types of beads can be recognized by their fabric and any inclusions run parallel to their perforation. The typical size of these types of beads are usually under 6mm in diameter, and their distribution ranges from South Africa to Korea. These monochrome draw beads, are also called Indo-Pacific beads.

Drawn Beads, as seen on the figure to the left, consist of small and monochrome beads that originate from locations such as South Africa and Korea. Drawn beads are also referred to as “Indo-Pacific Beads,” and they are manufactured by the utilization of glass tubes.

=== Wound Beads ===
Contrarily, another type of glass bead that has a limited supply, is known as wound beads. Wound beads are far more rare when being compared to drawn beads and the way they are made is by sheathing molten glass around a rod, stick, or wire. Wound beads on the other hand are made by wrapping molten glass around a rod, stick, or wire, then pressed into its shape and placed in a mold or decorated with colors of glass. These Wound beads are far more rare to find due to the limited distributions. These beads are recognized by having their fabric and inclusions encircling the perforation.

== Archaeological finds in the Philippines ==
=== Ille Cave ===
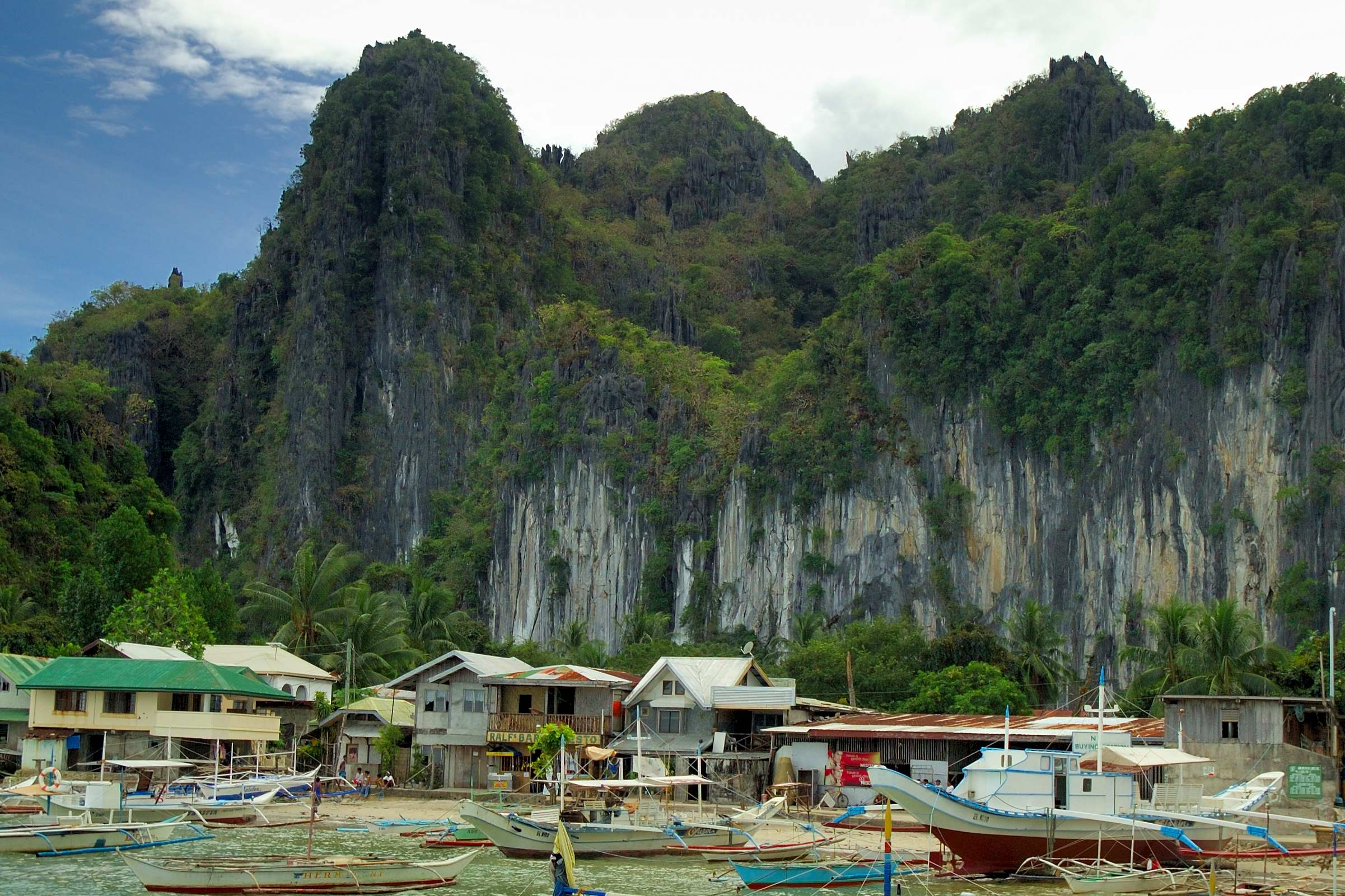
The Ille Cave in El Nido, Palawan

Ille site can be found in El Nido in Palawan along with other cave complexes. According to Szabó, characteristics of the shell beads that were found in the site were that they were all whole beads and belonged to the following species of mollusks: Cypraea annulus, Strombus canarium, Strombus luhuanus, Nassarius arcularius, Nassarius globosus, Nassarius albescens, Nassarius pullus, Pictocolumbella ocellata, and Pyrene scripta. Together with these beads were other, larger decorative pieces. Other modified shell décor were the microperforated cut shell beads which were much more uniform than the previous two types.

==== Ille Cave Shell bead analysis ====
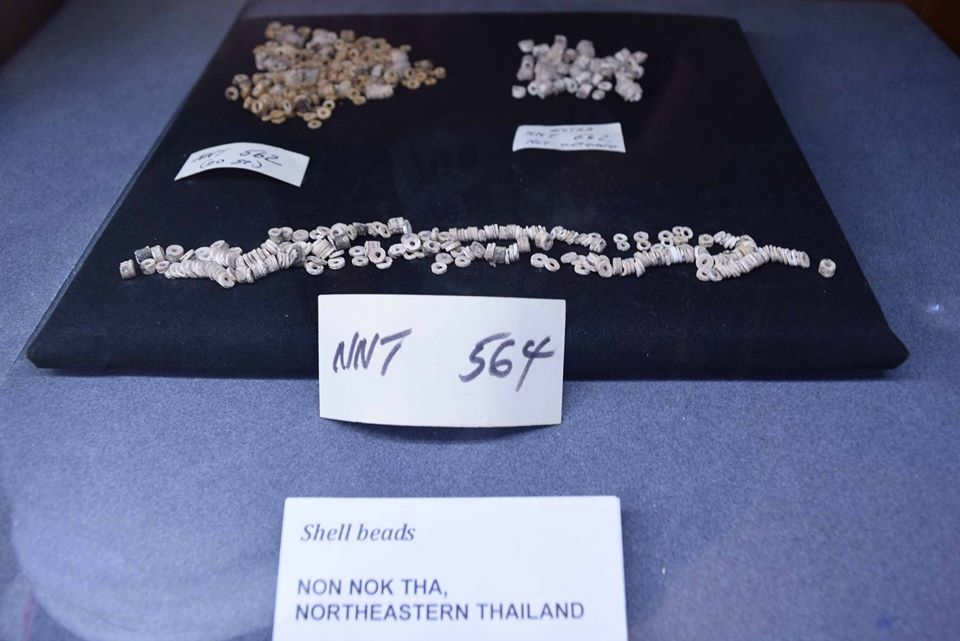
Shell Beads discovered in Thailand

Of the beads in the Ille, these were of two main types, the organic and inorganic types. Of the organic beads, majority of them were whole, Neolithic-type beads. Formation of these beads were characteristically formed by percussion and grinding. Of the organic shell beads, a small percentage of them are cut shell beads and not all of them were as uniform as the microperforated cut shell beads; the beads that do not display the use of technologically advanced techniques were shells of Tridacna rolled into a barrel shape. The microperforated cut-shell beads are generally less than 2 mm in diameter, and thus appear to require a great amount of effort and technique to produce; these can thus be said to belong to the Metal Age.

The microperforated cut shell beads were studied to have been formed in the following manner. Bead blanks were first formed from the raw shell followed by perforation by use of a drill with what is proposed to be a bow or pump drill. The blanks are then attached to a string and specific appliqués are added to complete the shell beads.

The latter shell beads support a high level of skill in their makers. A specific set of developed tools, specific processes and a concise plan are required to form these beads. Selection of the raw material itself would require extensive knowledge and experience as not all shells could undergo the different modifications without breaking. A coloring process by the addition of appliqués also shows us that the methodology to come up with such beads was well developed.

== Cambodia's Cardamom Mountains ==
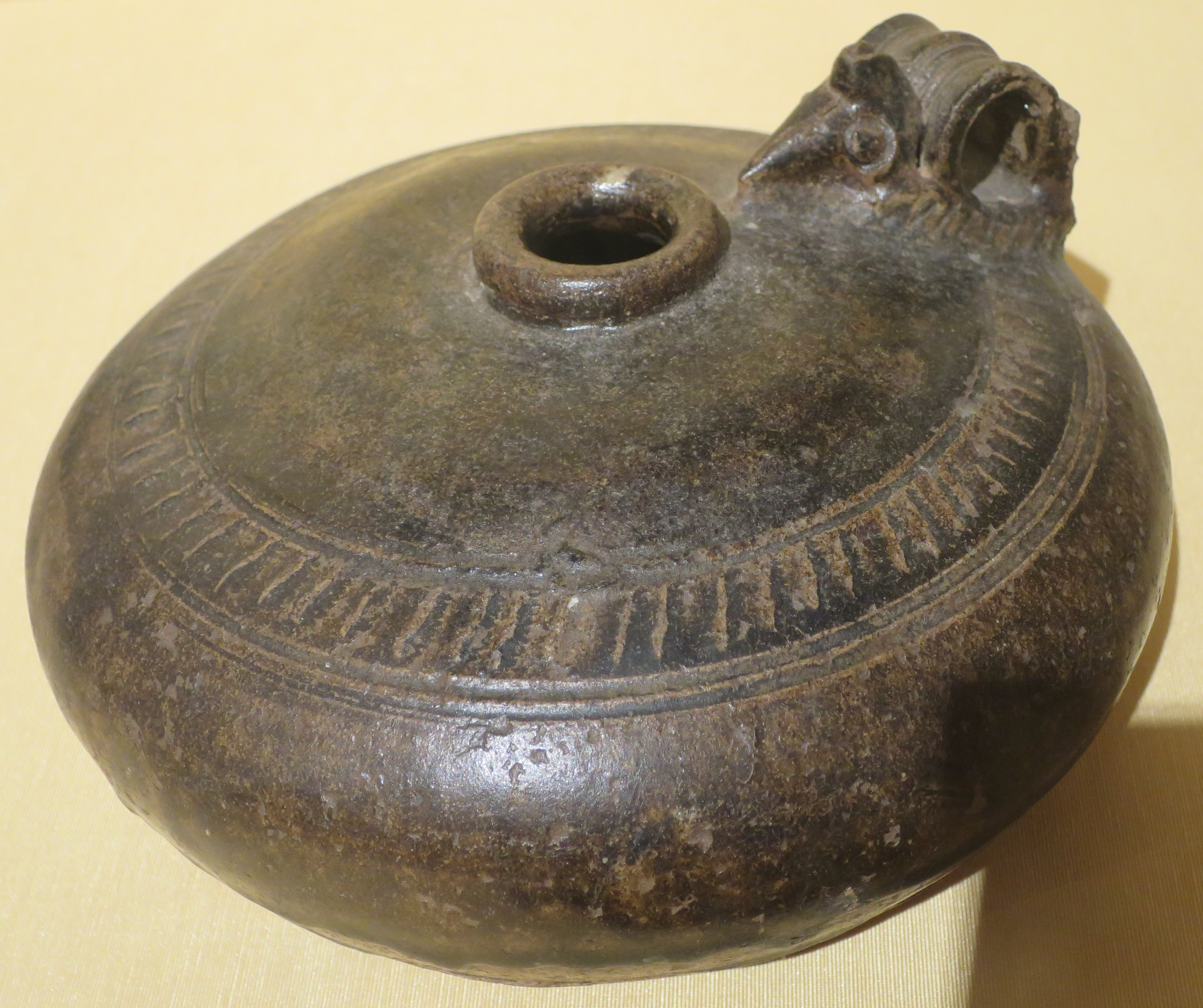
An image of the Ankorian Jar originating from Cambodia

The Cardamom Mountain range in Cambodia is a significant region which highlights the development of glass and stone beads. Within this Mountain range three burial sites were discovered to contain a large number of glass beads consisting of distinctly different components. The first site lie on a single rock ledge approximately three meters in length, called Phnom Khnang Peung.

This particular site is where the largest jar burial site was discovered. Researchers found forty intact jar burials and 1,414 glass beads found in jar burials and sediments near. The second location is called Okei, it sits on two small ledges, approximately thirty meters apart. This site held several Mae Nam Noi jars, one Angkorian jar and 298 glass beads collected in sediments near the Angkorian jar.

Lastly, the third site, Phnom Pel sits on two adjoining ledges and a third ledge. This site contained twelve wooden coffins with seven glass beads discovered from one coffin. The discoveries of these sites can provide indications of trade relationships between the upland populations as well as insight on understudied periods of bead exchanges in South-east Asia.

=== Three Compositional Groups of Glass Beads ===
There are three main compositional groups for these glass beads which can help distinguish them from one another; lead-potash glass, mineral soda-alumina glass, and a newly identified high-alumina glass. Lead-potash glass contains high concentration of lead and higher levels of potash in comparison to the others. The production of lead-potash glass beads is believed to have started in China during the sixth century specifically used in the Ming Dynasty. The colors found at these sites in this distinct type of glass bead are white, polychrome blue, opaque blue, red-orange opaque, transparent purple, ruby red, and opaque yellow. These Cambodian bead share similarities with beads found in the Philippines once again validating bead exchanges or technological movement between South-east Asian populations. High alumina mineral soda glass is identified by its low magnesia concentration, and has also been discovered on the eastern and southeastern coast of Africa, suggesting there may have been production centres on the west coast of India, possibly for export to Africa. The variety of colors these beads were produced in include, light and dark blues, opaque black, opaque yellow, opaque red and opaque green.

Finally, the newly identified high alumina glass beads discovered at these burial sites had a rather unusual composition as anthropologists would describe it. This glass bead contains lower concentrations of alumina and high magnesia concentrations. Although the location in which these newly discovered high alumina glass beads were manufactured are unknown, the research and excavations of beads from the 15th-16th century in South-east Asia are not studied as much as they should be considering the lack of information obtained. Evidence has shown that the exchange of glass beads was present in upland and lowland regions of Cambodia as well as island South-east Asia through discoveries of Chinese lead-potash glass beads. It is also evident that trade of glass beads traveled along the Indian Ocean network including East Africa and South-East Africa. While this newly discovered composition of glass beads proves how little we actually know about these glass beads and their exchange between the 15th and 16th centuries.

== Theories Surrounding Glass Beads ==
There are many theories formulated based on the discoveries of glass and stone beads found in the South-east Asian region. The most commonly studied theories revolve around the trade relationships between communities within the regions in which they were discovered. We can also assume that based on their formulation, early modern glass exchange was carried out through China, India, Sri Lanka, and the Near East. In the region of South-east Asia, glass beads were one of the most commonly traded objects for centuries. Their portability and durability is what made them an admirable item for trade. The discovery of Chinese-style glass beads in the Philippines also indicate a system for trade between Ifugao and other Philippine communities. Another commonly discussed theory involving glass beads were its association with the elite. These excavations of glass beads revealed that there was a connection with the presence of elites in island South-east Asia. considering the fact that there was an increase in prestigious goods.
