= Ifugao people =

Ethnic group of the Philippines

Ifugao
- Ifugao women carrying ulbong, the woven jars for storing rice.

Total population
- 309,816 Aggregated population of Ifugao, Ayangan, and Tuwali as per PSA 2020 (2020 census)

Regions with significant populations
- Philippines (Cordillera Administrative Region)

Languages
- Ifugao, Ilocano, Tagalog

Religion
- Christianity, indigenous folk religion

Related ethnic groups
- Igorot peoples

The Ifugao are the Austronesian ethnic group inhabiting Ifugao province in the Philippines. They live in the municipalities of Lagawe (capital of Ifugao), Aguinaldo, Alfonso Lista, Asipulo, Banaue, Hingyon, Hungduan, Kiangan, Lamut, Mayoyao, and Tinoc. The province is one of the smallest provinces in the Philippines with an area of only 251,778 hectares (622,160 acres), or about 0.8% of the total Philippine land area. In 1995, the population of the Ifugaos was 131,635. The 2020 Census shows an aggregated population of the Ifugao people to be 309,816 including Ifugao, Ayangan, and Tuwali but excluding the Kalanguya people. Although most of them are still in Ifugao province, some have moved to Baguio, where they work as woodcarvers, and to other parts of the Cordillera Region. Significant population of the Ifugao people extend to Cagayan Valley Region or Region 2, particularly in Nueva Vizcaya, Quirino, and Isabela, due to migration and the existence of their ancestral domains in some parts of Nueva Vizcaya. The population of the Ifugao people in Region 2 , including the Kalanguya people are 178,993.

== Demonym ==
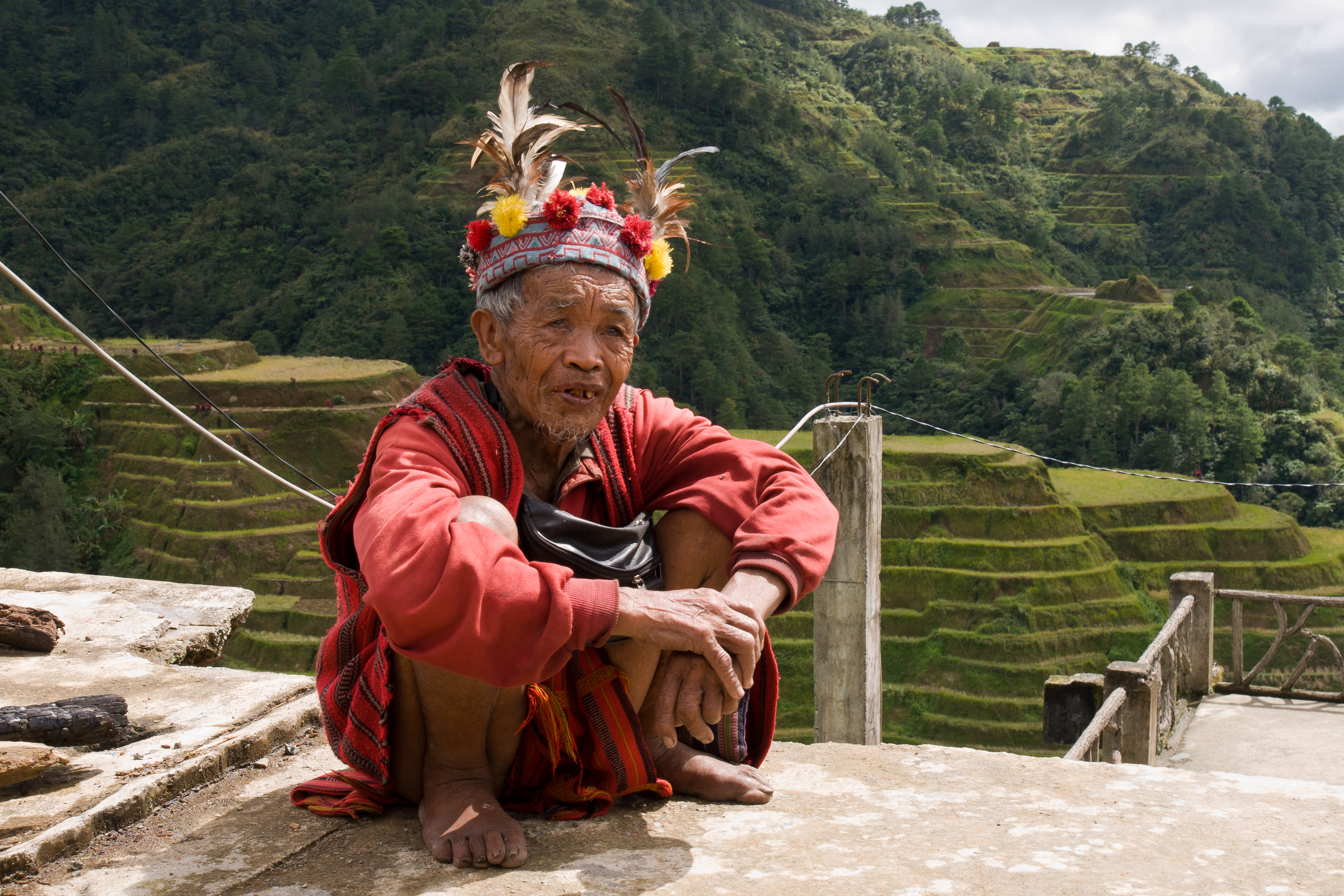
An Ifugao man from Banaue

The term Ifugao comes from ipugo, which means "earth people", "mortals" or "humans", as distinguished from spirits and deities. It also means "from the hill", as pugo means hill. The term Igorot or Ygolote was the term used by the Spanish for mountain people. The Ifugaos, however, prefer the name Ifugao.

== History ==
Henry Otley Beyer thought the Ifugaos came from southern China 2,000 years ago and migrated to Lingayen Gulf and the west coast of northern Luzon, after which they migrated to the Agno and Kayapa river valleys and into the Ifugao valleys. A theory by Felix Keesing, based on old Spanish sources, proposed that the ancestors of the Ifugao came from the Magat area after the arrival of the Spanish in Magat, so the rice terraces are only a few hundred years old. The Ifugao popular epic The Hudhud of Dinulawan and Bugan of Gonhadan supports this interpretation. A more recent theory by Manuel Dulawan assumes that the Ifugaos came from the western Mountain Province, due to striking similarities with Kankanaey language, architecture, clothing manufacturing and design and the many names and places from this region that feature in Ifugao myths and songs.

According to studies, the Ifugao resisted the Spanish conquest several times. The groups that migrated to the Cordilleran highlands were believed to be those that resisted the Spanish colonial control, which became prevalent in the lowlands. According to Stephen B. Acabado, the rugged nature of the highlands around the Ifugao region did not outrightly hinder the Spanish conquest. Other regions that had similar rugged environment as found in Ifugao were subjected to colonial rule. Archeological research shows Ifugao practices of successful resistance by strengthening their political and economic resources. The Spanish conquest and a population increase was the cause of shifting to wet-rice agriculture.

According to Queeny G. Lapeña and Acabado, in order to successfully resist against a colonizing power, a constructive military organization within a complete polity is required. The Spanish took conquest of the Magat Valley, which drove the Ifugao to strategically resettle in the interior of the Cordillera Mountains between 1600 CE and 1700 CE. Wet-rice agriculture was adopted soon after, and extensive rice terraces were built. This was a subsistence shift for the Ifugao because they cultivated taro before the start of the wet rice cultivation. The author emphasizes that the Ifugao people kept their culture and identity alive by spending large amounts of time in rice fields, since they treated them as ritual areas to "reinforce community solidarity." Stephen Acabado states that since the village was increasing in population, the shift to wet rice cultivation, increase of exotic goods procurement, and finally increase in the distribution of ritual animals indicates "political elaboration as a response to Spanish conquest."

== Demographics ==
According to the 2020 Census of Population and Housing (2020 CPH), the Ifugao population is distributed across several regions, with a significant concentration in the Cagayan Valley (Region 2) due to historical migration and ancestral domains extending beyond the borders of the Cordillera Administrative Region.

The following table breaks down the household population of Ifugao ethnic groups. Note that the Philippine Statistics Authority (PSA) often groups specific subgroups (such as the Mayoyao, Batad, or Banaue) under broader categories or as "Ifugao, not further classified."

Household Population by Ifugao Ethnic Group and Region (2020)
Ethnic Group	CAR	Region 2	Other Regions	Total (National)
Ifugao (not further classified)	21,915	39,150	21,653	82,718
Ayangan (incl. Ayangan-Henanga)	69,299	30,335	730	100,294
Tuwali (incl. Tuwali-Kele-i)	77,741	38,940	953	117,634
Kalanguya / Kallahan	50,501	70,568	5,735	126,804
TOTAL	219,456	178,993	29,071	427,450

Source: Philippine Statistics Authority (2020)

=== Subgroups ===
The Ifugao are divided into subgroups based on the differences in dialects, traditions, and design/color of costumes. The main subgroups are Ayangan, Kalanguya, and Tuwali.

== Language ==
The Ifugao language, a dialect continuum, consists of four languages namely Amganad, Mayaoyao, Batad, and Tuwali. Due to being isolated by the terrain, Ifugaos usually speak in Ilocano, Tagalog, and English as their alternative to their mother tongue.

== Agriculture ==
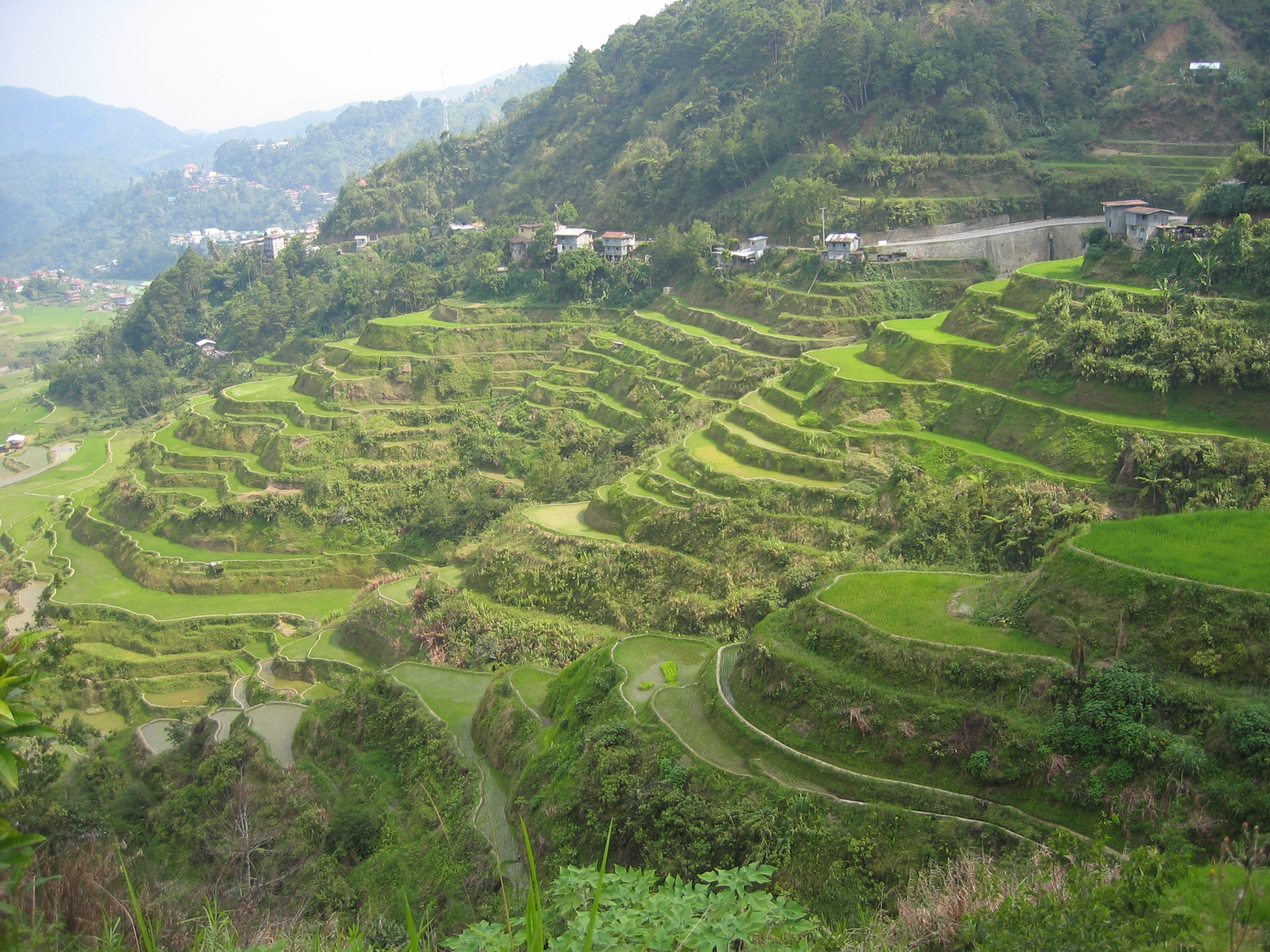
Banaue Rice Terraces

Ifugao farming is characterized by wet rice terraces, supplemented with slash-and-burn farming of camote. They are famous for their Banaue Rice Terraces, which became one of the main tourist attractions in the country. The Ifugaos host a number of similarities with the Bontocs in terms of agriculture, but the Ifugao tend to have more scattered settlements, and recognize their affiliation mostly towards direct kin in households closer to their fields.

The Spanish first described the Ifugao rice terraces in 1801. Though as William Scott notes, "These impressive stone-walled fields, irrigated for both rice and taro, had been known from the time of the first expeditions in to Kiangan in the 1750s..."

Ifugao culture revolves around rice, which is considered a prestige crop. There is an elaborate and complex array of rice culture feasts inextricably linked with taboos and intricate agricultural rites, from rice cultivation to rice consumption. Harvest season calls for grandiose thanksgiving feasts, while the concluding harvest rites tungo or tungul (the day of rest) entail a strict taboo of any agricultural work. Partaking of the rice wine (bayah), rice cakes, and moma (mixture of several herbs, powdered snail shell and betel nut/arecoline which is used as a chewing gum to the Ifugaos) is an indelible practice during the festivities and ritual activities. Agricultural terracing and farming are the principal means of livelihood. Their social status is measured by the number of rice field granaries, family heirlooms, gold earrings, and carabaos (water buffaloes). Prestige is also conferred through time and tradition.

A prayer is said by an elderly woman when harvest begins, directed towards Cabunian, the goddess of rice. Then, a protective prayer is said before the rice is placed in the granary.

The Ifugao solar calendar included a 365-day year, broken down into 13 months of 28 days each, plus one extra day.

== Social organization ==
Ifugao society is divided into three social classes: the kadangyan or the aristocrats, the tagu or the middle class, and the nawotwot or the lower class. The class immediately below the wealthiest are called the inmuy-ya-uy. The kadangyans sponsor the prestige rituals called hagabi and uyauy and this separates them from the tagus who cannot sponsor feasts but are economically well off. The nawotwots are those who have limited land properties and are usually hired by the upper classes to do work in the fields and other services. The more affluent Ifugao, known as kadangyan or baknang, were usually generous by nature, lending rice to poor neighbors in time of food shortage(s) and/or hardship(s), in return for labor. Acting as village or spiritual leaders, creditors or commercial managers, these rich families exhibited their wealth by providing for many feasts, or cañaos.

Shifting to wet rice cultivation is one factor that intensified the social ranking that was already present among the Ifugao society. Those who adopted wet rice cultivation were able to consolidate political resources. "In Ifugao, the adoption of wet-rice agriculture is at the forefront in discussions regarding social ranking vis-à-vis prestige economy." The Ifugao social status is based on their rice lands and ability to sponsor feasts. One reason being is that an individual needs to be skilled in mobilizing rice terraces, and because rice terraces require labor-intensive work.

== Culture ==
Ifugao culture values kinship, family ties, religious and cultural beliefs. Ifugao are unique among all ethnic groups in the mountain province for their narrative literature such as the hudhud, an epic dealing with hero ancestors sung in a poetic manner. Also unique to the Ifugao is their woodcarving art, most notably the carved granary guardians bulul and the prestige bench of the upper class, the hagabi. Their textiles are renowned for their sheer beauty, colorful blankets and clothing woven on looms. The Ifugao are known for their rich oral literary traditions of hudhud and the alim. In 2001, the Hudhud Chants of the Ifugao was chosen as one of the 11 Masterpieces of the Oral and Intangible Heritage of Humanity. It was then formally inscribed as a UNESCO Intangible Cultural Heritage in 2008.

The Ifugaos' highest prestige feasts are the hagabi, sponsored by the elite (kadangyan); and the uyauy, a marriage feast sponsored by those immediately below the wealthiest (inmuy-ya-uy). Ifugao heirloom beads are prestigious goods that were limited to the Ifugao community of wealth; moreover, such beads were solely utilized for ritualistic occasions such as: funerals, weddings, and rice harvest festivals and signified respect.

Rice granaries (alang) are protected by a wooden guardian called a bulul. The bulul sculptures are highly stylized representations of the ancestors of the Ifugao and are thought to gain power and wealth from the presence of the ancestral spirit. The Ifugao are particularly noted for their skill in carving bulul.

Furthermore, Ifugao culture is known for their legal system, based on the elders of the village, amama-a. Their words had the effect of law, without appeal. The jury, agom, consisted of those articulate, mansapit, elders. If the jury could not decide a case, trial by ordeal was invoked. The logic being that the gods and goddesses, Kabunian, would not allow the innocent to suffer. Criminal cases are tried by ordeal. They include duels (uggub/alao), wrestling (bultong), hot bolo ordeal and boiling water ordeal (da-u).

Bultong is the name for the Ifugao sport of traditional wrestling. It is often played during town and provincial fiestas. Bultong falls under the international classification of "belt wrestling".

=== Customs ===
From a person's birth to his death, the Ifugaos follow a lot of traditions. Pahang and palat di oban are performed to a mother to ensure safe delivery. After delivery, no visitors are allowed to enter the house until among is performed when the baby is given a name. Kolot and balihong are then performed to ensure the health and good characteristics of the boy or the girl, respectively. As they grow older, they sleep in exclusive dormitories because it is considered indecent for siblings of different genders to sleep in the same house. The men are the ones who hunt, recite myths, and work in the fields. Women also work in the fields, aside from managing the homes and reciting ballads. Lastly, the Ifugaos do not mourn for the elderly who died, nor for the baby or the mother who died in a conception. This is to prevent the same event from happening again in the family. Also, the Ifugaos believe in life after death so those who are murdered are given a ritual called opa to force their souls into the place where his ancestors dwell. The Ifugao may believe that an illegitimate child might have more than one physical father, and so nominate more than one genitor.

=== Headhunting ===
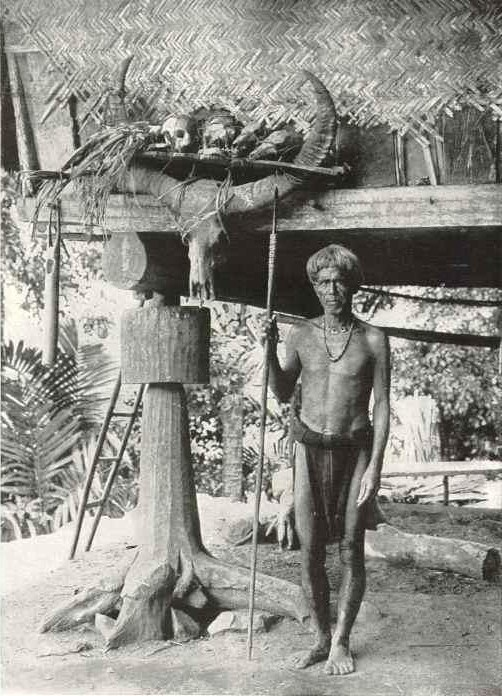
An Ifugao warrior with some of his trophies, circa 1912

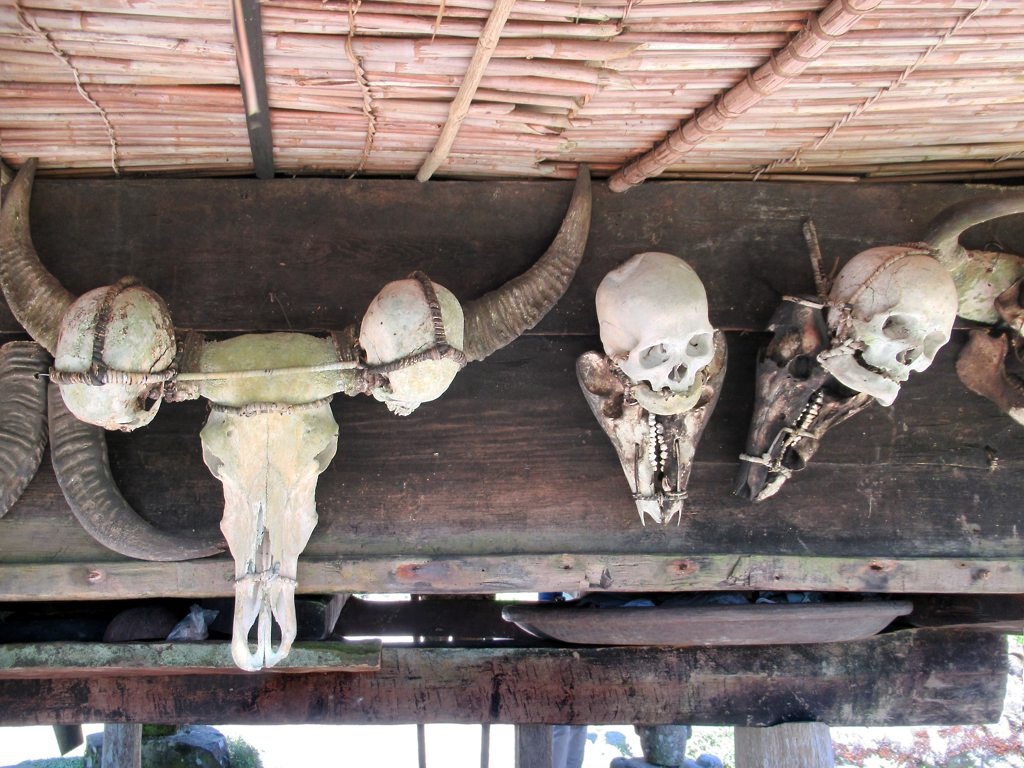
Headhunting skulls collected as trophies during blood feuds, displayed at the Hiwang Native House Inn near Banaue, Ifugao

The Ifugao, like the other peoples of the Cordillera Central, are known for their past as headhunters. The two main reasons for the Ifugao's headhunting were honor killings and prestige. After a murder or other serious crime, the victim's family organized a punitive expedition. The perpetrator or someone close to him was tracked down, murdered, and beheaded, in order to uphold the honor of the family. Such a punitive expedition usually also provoked a counteraction and such feuds could thus continue for generations.

In addition to such acts of revenge, attacks were also organized in which a successful outcome increased the prestige of the mostly young participating men. Such attacks, often on a distant village, killed indiscriminately. In some areas, such as the area around Kiangan, women and children were spared and sold into slavery, but other headhunters did not spare them either.

Besides the above reason, there were other reasons for an Ifugao to headhunt, such as the death of a wife during childbirth, whereupon a husband felt compelled to take the head of a stranger so that the soul of the deceased might find rest in the afterlife. Moreover, it was believed that if such an action were not carried out, the close relative would also become ill and die.

Headhunting, like all important events in the life of the Ifugao, was surrounded by all kinds of customs and rituals. Beforehand, animals were sacrificed to the gods. Also, on the way to the target, they looked out for any bad omens, such as a crossing snake. Such an omen could be a reason to postpone the headhunting expedition. After a successful outcome, there was partying and dancing for five nights around the captured heads, the head of the victim usually going to the leader of the expedition. A fighter's success was reflected in the number of earrings he wore. Each earring represented a severed head. Afterward, the heads were buried in the ground around the expedition leader's house, after which they were dug up and cleaned again after a few months. The skulls eventually ended up hanging in prominent places in his house, such as by the door or the fire.

All kinds of rituals were also performed on the side of the victim. The victim's family performed a war dance (himong) and vowed revenge. Later, the victim was buried in a sitting position with a spear in his hand, as a sign that revenge was about to be taken. Finally, a ritual was performed that determined who should lead the revenge against the killers. The family of the deceased sat in a circle around a mortally injured chicken and the man where the chicken would eventually fall dead became the expedition leader.

The practice of headhunting has long been a thing of the past. The last incidents occurred in the early 20th century.

=== Cuisine ===
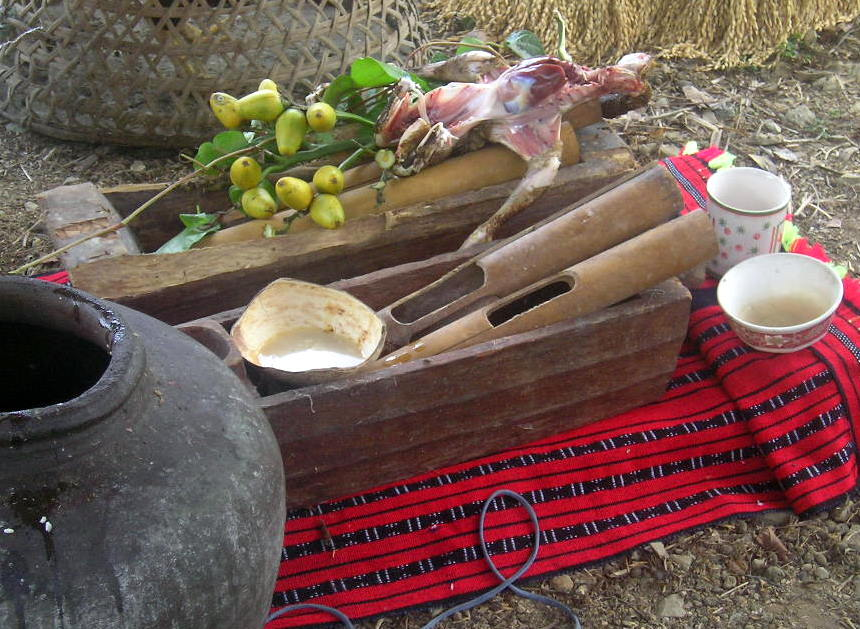
A jar and bowls of baya or bubud (tapuy) in a harvest ritual by an Ifugao mumbaki (shaman)

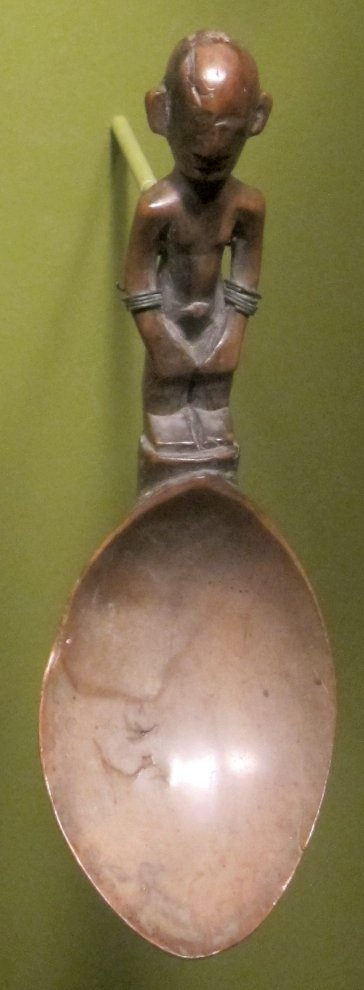
An Ifugao rice spoon in the Honolulu Museum of Art

The basic meal of the Ifugao is composed of a staple starch, more commonly rice as it is their staple food, served with dishes like vegetables, fish or snails, flavorings, and sometimes, cooked animal meat like chicken and pig. During low levels of rice, the Ifugao consume grain or root crops like sweet potatoes. Fresh berries and other plant products and plants are served as snacks. Rice wine (called baya or bubud) is a must in most rituals and special occasions with homemade yeast and glutinous rice as the basic ingredients. Wooden rice spoons with sacred carved images of bulul representing deities or ancestral spirits (anito) are traditional among the Ifugao people. Despite the animistic carvings, they are everyday utensils used for eating rice or soups or serving rice wine. Today, they are commonly sold as souvenirs to tourists.

=== Tattooing ===
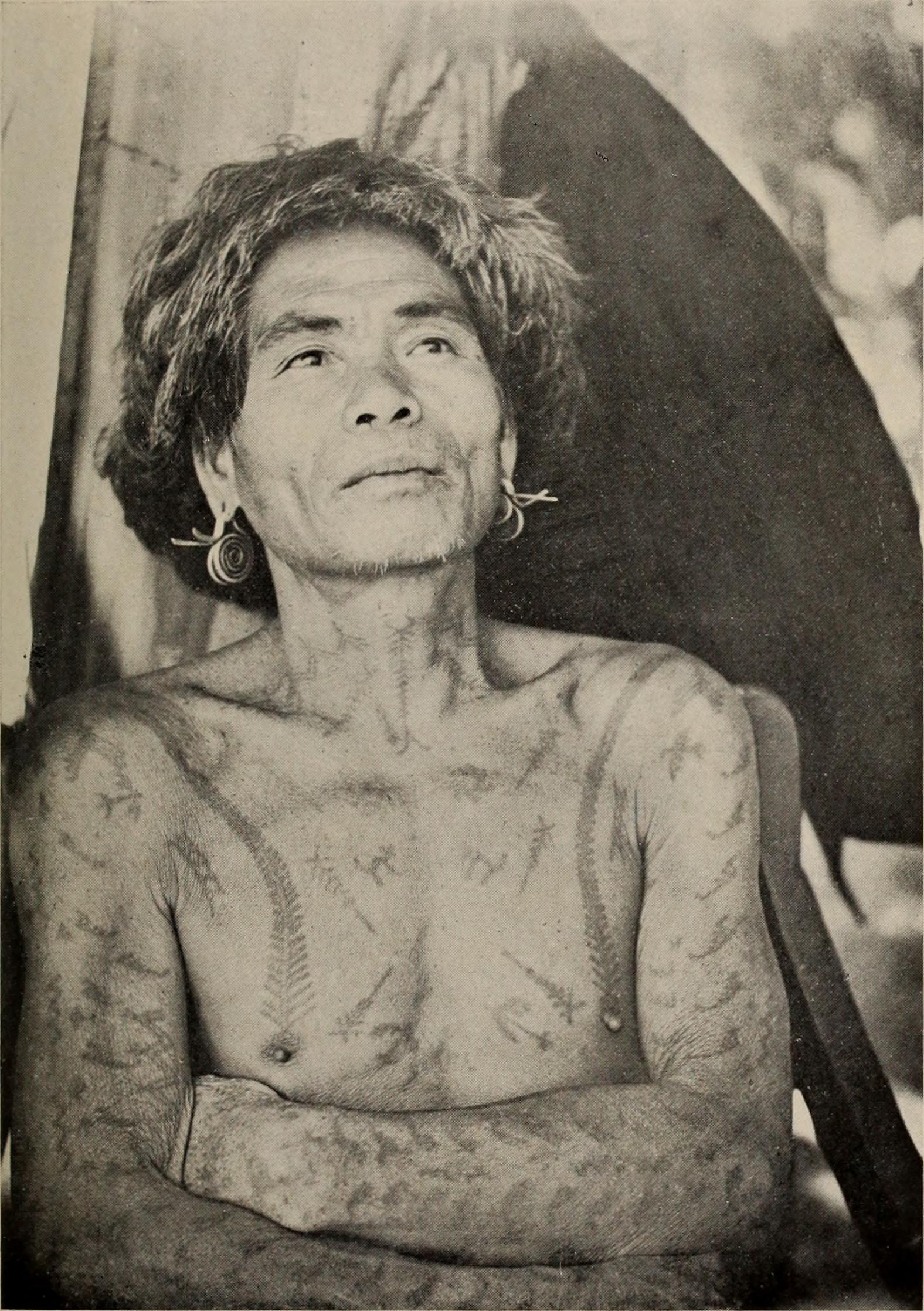
A tattooed Ifugao man (1903)

Among Ifugao men, tattoos were strongly linked to the widespread practice of head-hunting raids. In head-hunting societies, like the Ifugao, tattoos were records of how many heads the warriors had taken in battle, and were part of the initiation rites into adulthood. The number, design, and location of tattoos, therefore, were indicative of a warrior's status and prowess. They were also regarded as magical wards against various dangers like evil spirits and illnesses. Common Ifugao motifs include the kinabu (dog), usually placed on the chest; tinagu (human figures); and ginawang or ginayaman (centipedes).

=== Courtship ===
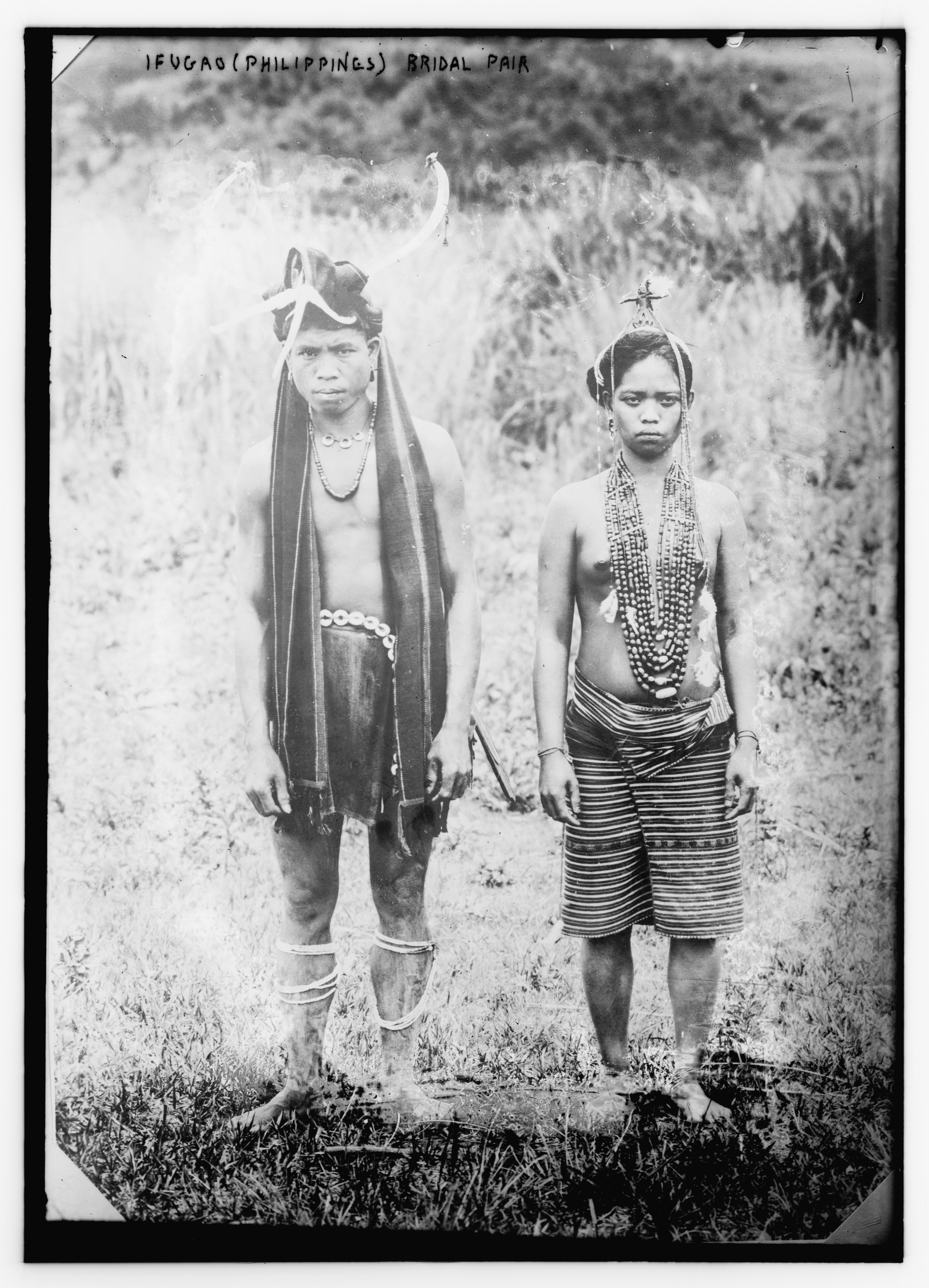
An Ifugao bridal pair (c. 1910). Note the kango or yang ngo on the man.

Betrothals are common among the Ifugao, especially among the wealthy class; and they perform several customs in marriage like bubun (providing a pig to the woman's family). The Ifugao practice a courtship called ca-i-sing (this practice is known as the ebgan to the Kalinga tribes and as pangis to the Tingguian tribes), wherein males and females are separated into "houses". The house for the males is called the Ato, while the house for females is known as the olog or agamang. The males visit the females in the olog – the "betrothal house" – to sing romantic songs. The females reply to these songs also through singing. The ongoing courtship ritual is overseen by a married elder or a childless widow who keeps the parents of the participating males and females well informed of the progress of the courtship process. The Ifugao people had well-established values regarding marriage and sexuality. An example of these is their custom of equating the size of a woman's breast and the wideness of her hips with the price of the dowry.

During the marriage ceremony (uya-uy), the man usually wears a headress known as the kango (literally "hornbill"; also yang ngo). The kango is a symbol of wealth and is made from the skull and beak of a rufous hornbill flanked by two sweeping horns resembling the horns of a carabao. It is anchored with rattan fiber and is decorated with feathers and beads. It is also wrapped with a newly-woven loincloth whose ends hang down to the waist. The kango is also worn by wealthy men on other special occasions, including their funeral.

=== Clothing ===
Men wear a loincloth (wanoh) while women wear a wraparound skirt (ampuyo, also known as tapis). On special occasions, men wear a betel bag (pinuhha) and their bolo (gimbattan).

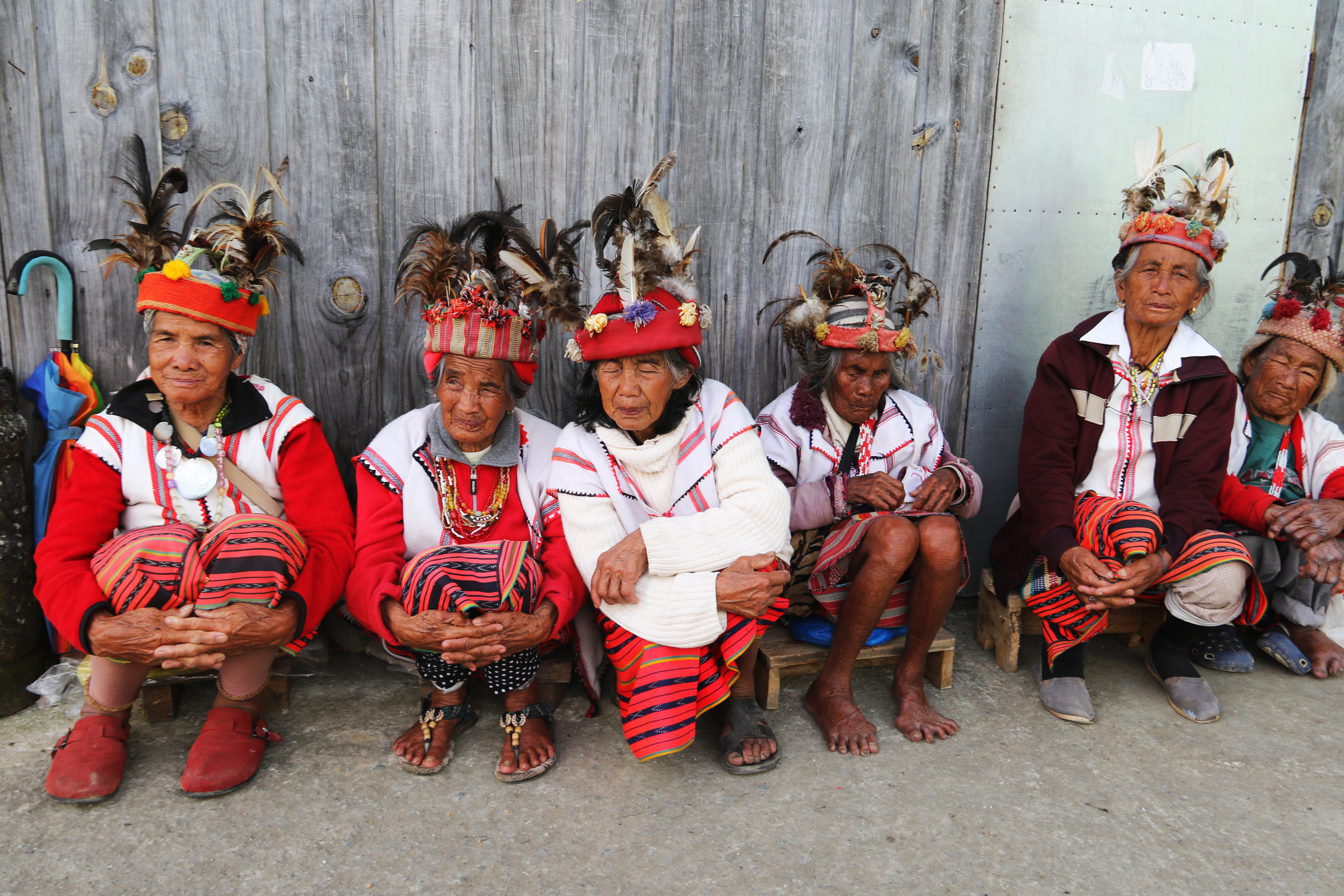
Ifugao people in their traditional clothing

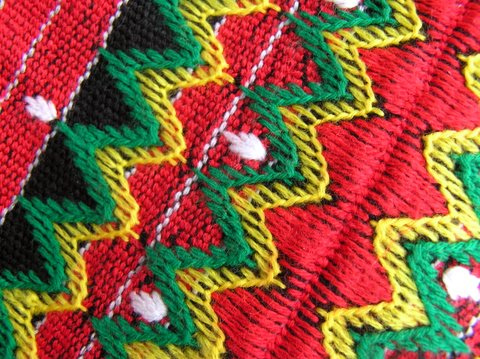
Fabric weaved from Ifugao

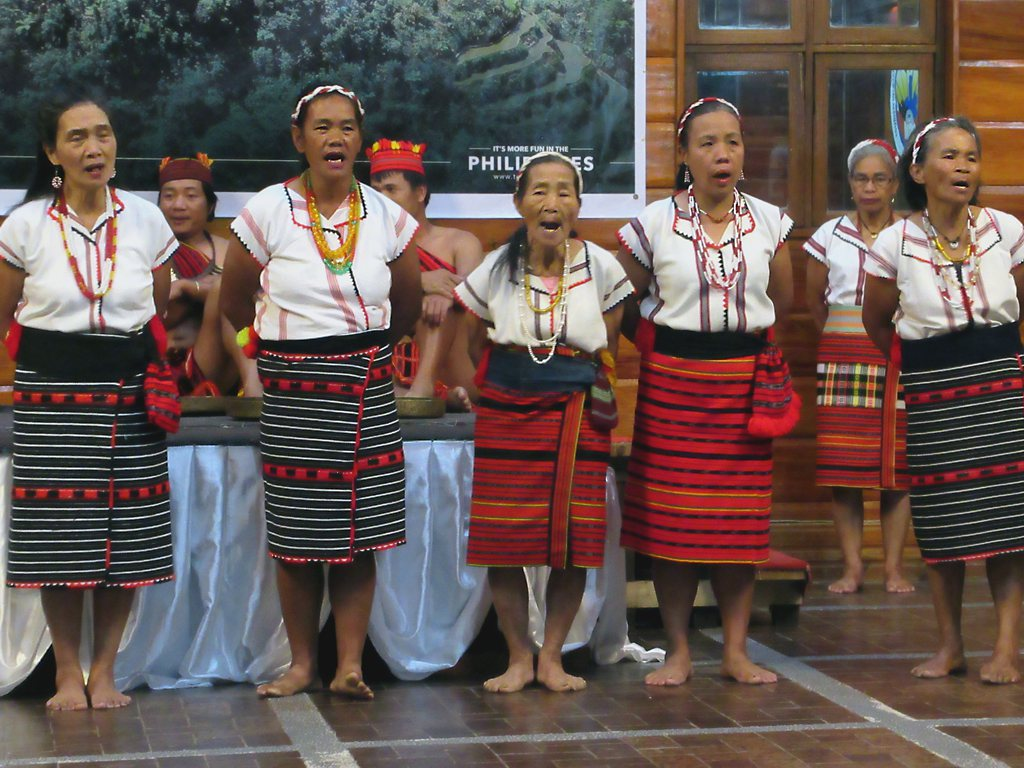
Ifugao women in Banaue wearing alampay

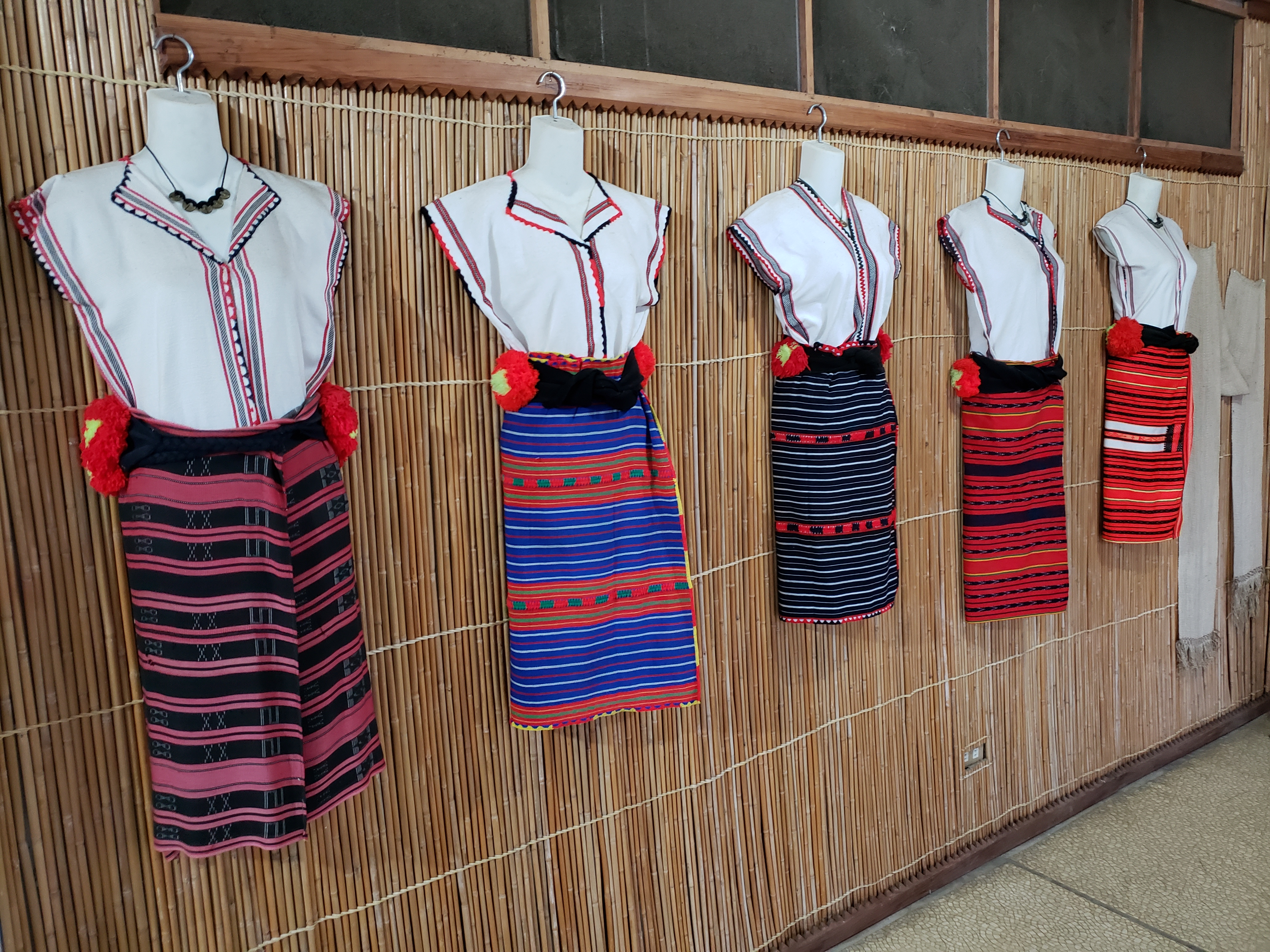
Native Ifugao dress

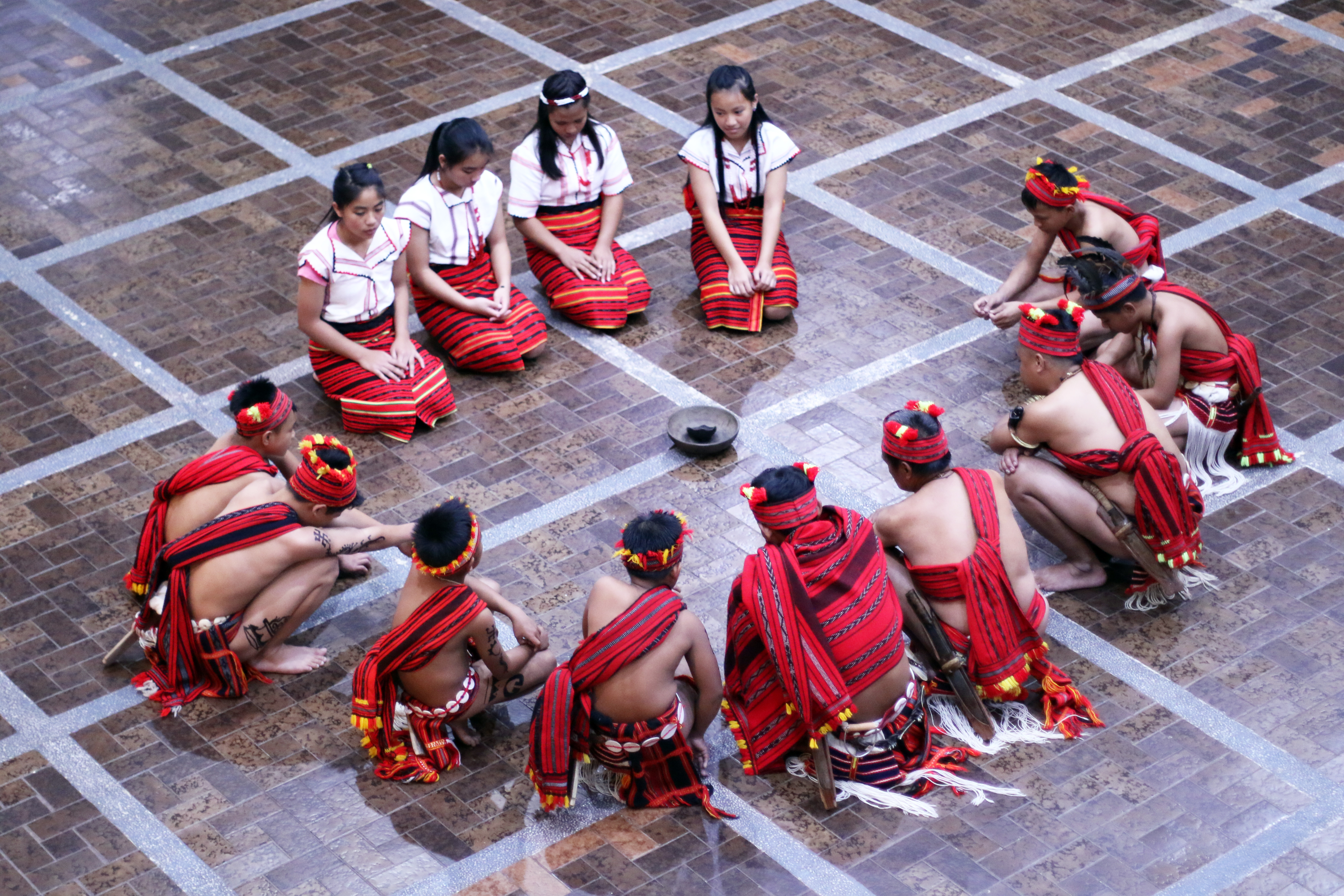
Ifugao youth in their traditional clothing

=== Music ===
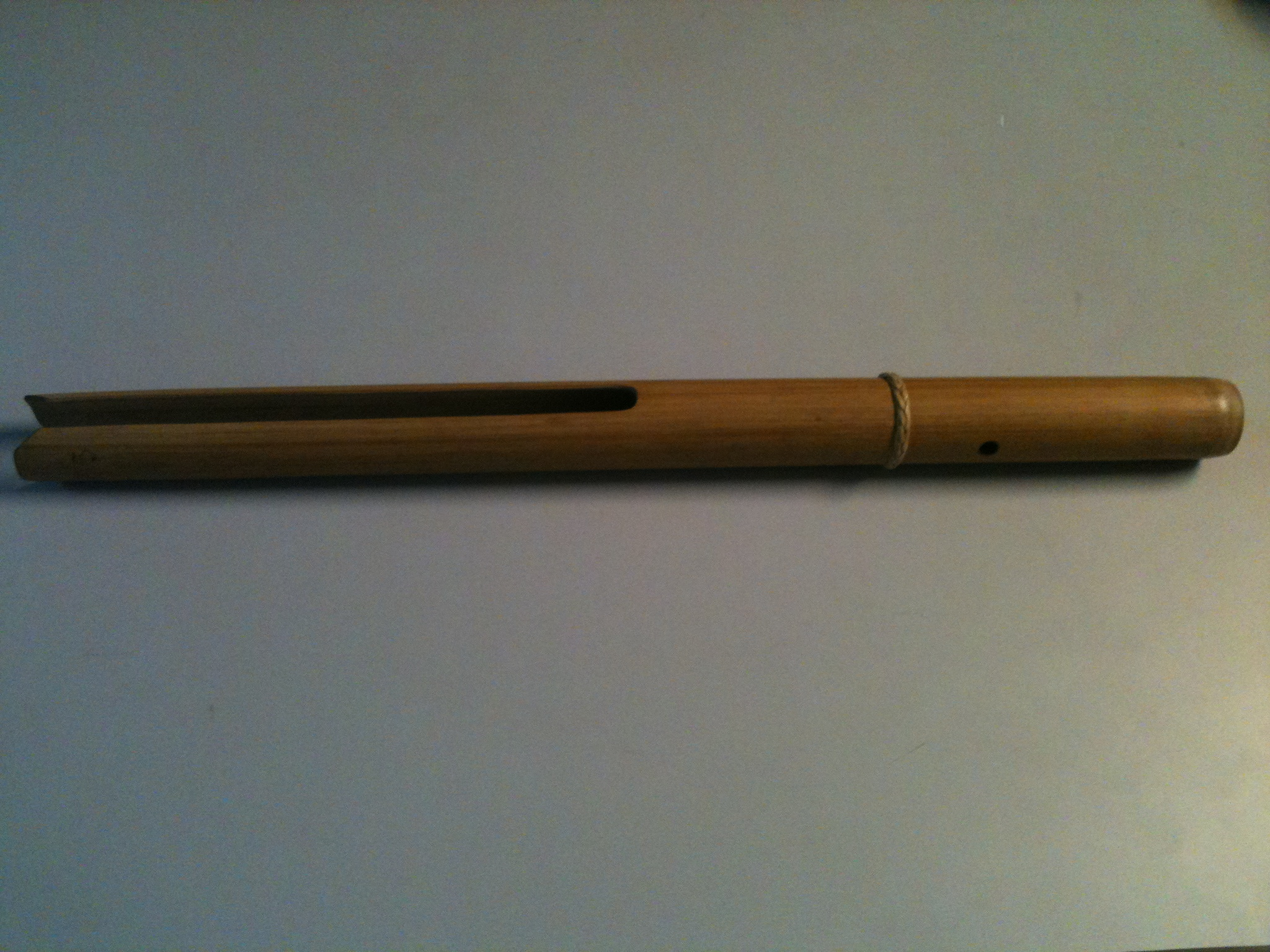
A pewpep, also known as bungkaka

Musical instruments include gongs (gangha), a wooden instrument that is struck with another piece of wood (bangibang), a thin brass instrument that is plucked (bikkung), stringed instruments (ayyuding and babbong), nose flutes (ingngiing) and mouth flutes (kupliing or ippiip). The pewpew is a percussion instrument made out of bamboo.

=== Housing ===
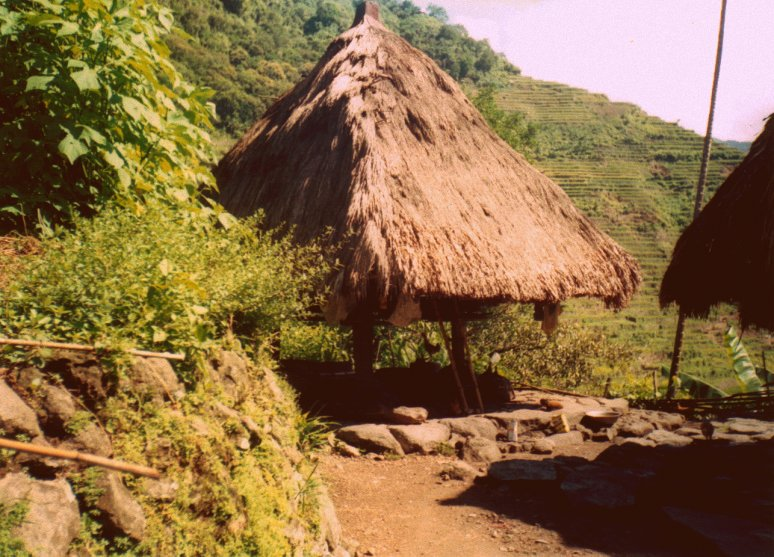
A traditional Ifugao house, called bale, with the Batad rice terraces in the background

Ifugao houses (Bale) are built on four wooden posts 3 meters from the ground, and consist of one room, a front door (panto) and back door (awidan), with a detachable ladder (tete) to the front door. Temporary huts (abong) give shelter to workers in the field or forest.

William Scott describes the details associated with the Ifugao house, "Square in floor plan, it is elevated to about shoulder height by four posts (tukud), around which are fitted cynlindrical wooden rat-guards (halipan), carrying two transverse girders (kuling) which support three floor joists into which the floorboards (dotal) are fitted and wallboards (goab and pamadingan) and studs (bagad) are mortised. The four studs, placed at the corner of the house, are mortised at their upper end into four tie-beans or purlins (wanan) which form a square to carry much of the weight of the roof as well as the central crossbeam (pumpitolan) on which stand two queenposts (taknang). These queenposts terminate in a small square (ambubulan) which supports the upper ends of the rafters (bughol), the roof being a true pyramid in form with four triangular sides and thus rising to an apex without any ridgepole. The wallboards are rabbeted into a transverse beam (huklub) at waist or chest height, at which point a shelf (patie) is fitted between them and the roof, whose eaves descend as low as the level of the floor. Above the tie beams a reed floor or platform is often fitted to make an attic-like storage space (palan) for unthreshed rice. Wooden panels close doorways on two opposite sides of the house, and entrance is gained by means of a ladder which is removed at night. This type of house is called bale (or fale), but the same basic building with a few modifications - the wallboards extend up to the roof, there is only one door, and the whole thing is smaller - serves as a rat-proof granary (alang)."

== Religion ==
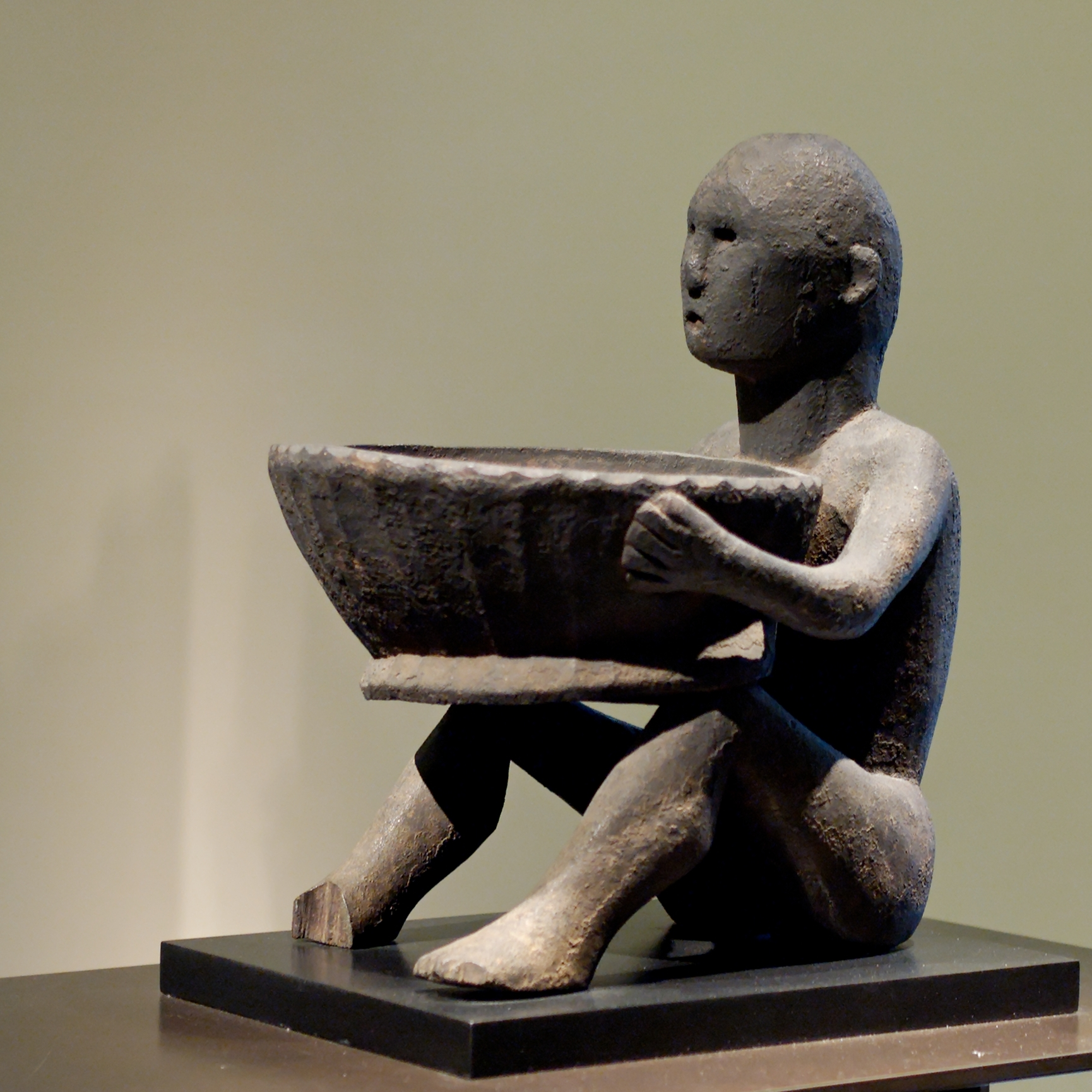
15th century Ifugao bulul with a pamahan (ceremonial bowl) in the Louvre Museum, France.

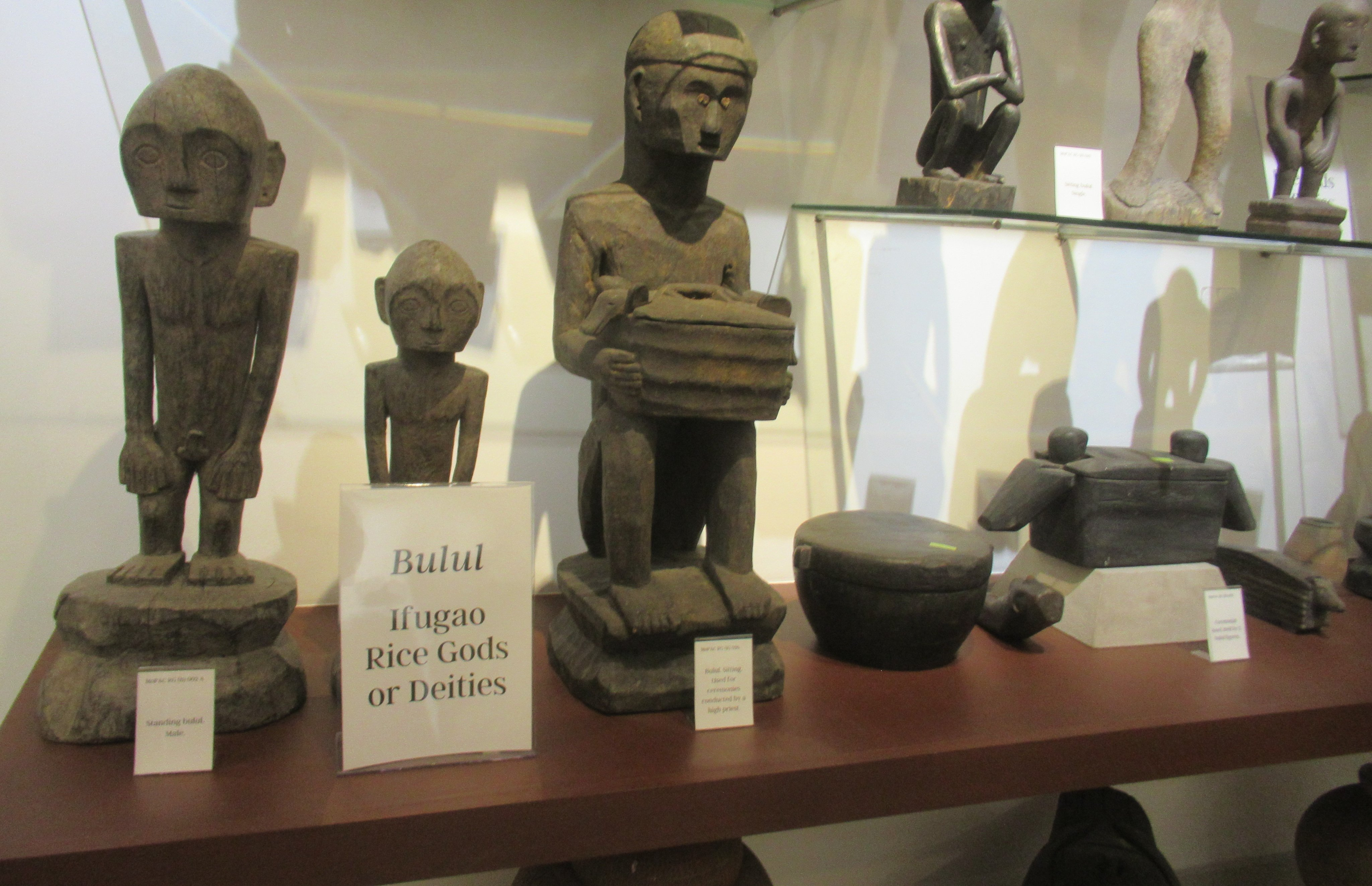
Bulul Ifugao rice gods or deities in a museum

Although a majority of the Ifugao already converted to Roman Catholic from their original animistic religion, from their mythology, they believed that they descended from Wigan and Bugan, who are the children of Bakkayawan and Bugan of the Skyworld (Kabunyan).

Ifugaos believe in 6 worlds, Skyworld (Kabunyan), Earthworld (Pugaw), Underworld (Dalom), the Eastern World (Lagud), the Western World (Daya), and the Spiritual World (Kadungayan). Talikud carries the Earthworld on his shoulders and cause earthquakes. The ifugaos include nature and ancestor worship, and participate in rituals (baki) presided over by a mumbaki. Priests (munagao and mumbini) guide the people in rites for good fortune.

=== Ifugao gods ===
- Kabunian: supreme deity and chief among the high ranking deities above the skyworld; also referred to as Mah-nongan, chief god generally referred to as the honorary dead and creator of all things; in specific communities, both the names Mah-nongan and Kabunian (also Afunijon) are understood as the name of one chief deity, while in others, they are used to refer to many deities
- Afunijon: also a general term referred to the deities of heaven, which is also called Afunijon
- Mah-nongan: also a general term for deities who are given animal sacrifices
- Ampual: the god of the fourth skyworld who bestowed animals and plants on the people; controls the transplanting of rice
- Bumingi: in charge of worms, one of the eleven beings importuned to stamp out rice pests
- Liddum: the only deity who inhabits the realm called Kabunian; communicates directly with humans on earth; chief mediator between the people and other gods
- Lumadab: has the power to dry up the rice leaves, one of the eleven beings importuned to stamp out rice pests
- Mamiyo: the stretcher of skeins, one of the twenty-three deities presiding over the art of weaving
- Monlolot: the winder of thread on the spindle, one of the twenty-three deities presiding over the art of weaving
- Puwok: controls the dread typhoons
- Yogyog: a causer of earthquakes; dwells in the underworld
- Alyog: a causer of earthquakes; dwells in the underworld
- Kolyog: the god of earthquakes
- Makalun: spirits that serve the function as messengers of the gods
- Namtogan: the paraplegic god of good fortune whose presence made rice harvests and community livestock bountiful; when the humans he was staying with at Ahin began neglecting the bulul, he left, causing a curse of misfortunes; the people persuaded him to return, where he responded by teaching the people how to create bululs and how to do the rituals for the statues, effectively lifting the curse
- Bulol: household divinities that are the souls of departed ancestors; usually depicted as carved wooden statues stored in the rice granary; the ancestral images guard the crops, make the rice harvest plentiful, and protects the rice from pests and thieves and from being too quickly consumed
- Nabulul: spouse of Bugan; a god who possesses or lives in Bulul figures; guards the rice and make the rice harvest plentiful
- Bugan: spouse of Nabulul; a goddess who possesses or lives in Bulul figures; guards the rice and make the rice harvest plentiful
- Gatui: divinities associated with practical jokes, but have a malevolent side that feast on souls and cause miscarriages
- Tagbayan: divinities associated with death that feast on human souls that are guarded by two headed monsters called kikilan
- Imbayan: also called Lingayan; divinities who guide souls after they die
  - Himpugtan: an Imbayan divinity who can terminate those that displease him
- Munduntug: divinities from the mountains who cause hunters to be lost
- Banig: spirits of the hillsides and caves; among the Mayayao, the Banig take in the form of an animal who does not harm anyone, despite the people being afraid of their manifestation
- Mun-apoh: deified ancestral spirits who are guardians and sources of blessings provided by the living; they are respected, however, their blessings could also be turned into a curse
- Mahipnat: great spirits of sacred places
- Bibao: spirits of ordinary places
- Halupi: divinities of remembrance
- Fili: divinities of property
- Dadungut: divinities who dwell in graveyards and tombs
- Makiubaya: divinities who watch over the gates of the village
- Spirits of sickness
  - Libligayu
  - Hibalot
- Binudbud: spirits that are invoked during feasts to quell the passions of men
- Kolkolibag: spirits who cause difficult labor
- Indu: spirits that make omens
- Hidit: divinities who give punishments to those that break taboos
  - Puok: a kind of Hidit who use winds to destroy the dwellings of miners that break taboos
- Hipag: spirits of war that give soldiers courage on the field of war but are ferocious and cannibalistic
- Llokesin: the god of rats who figures in the myth of the first orange tree
- Bumabakal: the rejected corpse divinity of the skyworld; his dead body resides on top of Mount Dukutan, where his bodily fluids cause boils
- Kabigat: the god who sent a deluge which flooded the Earth; married to the goddess Bugan
- Bugan: a goddess married to Kabigat; her children are a son named Wigan and a daughter also named Bugan
- Bugan: daughter of Bugan and Kabigat; stranded on Earth after the great deluge, and became one of the two ancestors of mankind
- Wigan: son of Bugan and Kabigat; stranded on Earth after the great deluge, and became one of the two ancestors of mankind
- Wigan: the god of good harvest
- Dumagid: a god who lived among the people of Benguet; married a mortal woman named Dugai and had a son named Ovug
- Ovug: son of Dumagid and Dugai; was cut in half by his father, where one of his halves was reanimated in the skyworld, and the other on Earth; the voice of the skyworld's Ovug is the source of lightning and sharp thunder, while the voice of the Earth's Ovug is the source of low thunder
- Bangan: the god who accompanied Dumagid in claiming Ovug from the Earth
- Aninitud chalom: deity of the underworld, whose anger is manifested in a sudden shaking of the earth
- Aninitud angachar: deity of the sky world; causes lightning and thunder when unsatisfied with offerings
- Mapatar: the Sun deity of the sky in charge of daylight
- Bulan: the Moon deity of the night in charge of nighttime
- Mi'lalabi: the star and constellation deities
- Pinacheng: a group or class of deities usually living in caves, stones, creeks, rocks, and in every place; mislead and hide people
- Fulor: a wood carved into an image of a dead person seated on a death chair; an antique which a spirit in it, who bring sickness, death, and unsuccessful crops when sacrifices are not offered
- Inamah: a wooden plate and a home of spirits; destroying or selling it will put the family in danger

=== Other figures ===
- Dugai: the mortal mother of the split god Ovug; wife of the god Dumagid
- Humidhid: the headman of a village in the upstream region of Daya who carved the first bulul statues from the haunted or supernatural tree named Bongbong
- Unnamed Shaman: prayed to the deities, Nabulul and Bugan, to possess or live in the bulul statues carved by Humidhid
- Wife of Namtogan: a mortal woman who the god Namtogan married when he stayed at the village of Ahin

== See also ==
- Igorot people
