= Kalanguya people =

Austronesian ethnic group

Kalanguya
Total population
- 126,804 (2020)

Regions with significant populations
- Philippines (Cordillera Administrative Region)

Languages
- Kalanguya, Ilocano, Tagalog

Religion
- Christianity, indigenous folk religion

Related ethnic groups
- Igorot peoples

The Kalanguya (also sometimes called the Ikalahan) are an Austronesian ethnic group most closely associated with the Philippines' Cordillera Administrative Region, but who also live in the provinces of Nueva Vizcaya, Nueva Ecija, and Pangasinan. While this area spans Region I, the Cordillera Administrative Region, and Region II, it represents a largely geographically contiguous area. Initially thought by some researchers as a subgroup of the Ifugao people, extensive studies have now shown that the Kalanguya are distinct from the Ifugao.

== Names ==
The term "Kallahan" sometimes also means the Kalanguya people's native language. Himes (1998) determined the dialectal groups of the Kalanguya people as well as the preferred endonym of each Kalanguya dialectal groups and their places.

- Ahin - Ahin, Tinoc, Ifugao
  Mandekey - Amlimay, Buguias, Benguet
  Hanglulaw - Amduntog, Asipolo, Ifugao
  Kayapa Kalanguya — Kayapa Proper, Kayapa, Nueva Vizcaya
  Mankehang - Sitio Tinudan, Poblacion, Kabayan, Benguet
  Keley-i - Antipolo, Asipolo, Ifugao

== Language ==
Kalanguya is actively spoken in parts of today's Benguet, Nueva Vizcaya, Ifugao, Mountain Province, and some parts of Nueva Ecija.

== Culture ==
There are two classes of society, the rich (baknang or Kadangyan) and the poor (biteg or abiteng). Ikalahan practice swidden (“slash-and-burn”) farming (inum-an) of camote, and yam (gabi).

Ikalahan houses, traditionally made for one nuclear family, have reeds (pal-ot) or cogon (gulon) for roofs, barks or slabs of trees for the walls, and palm strips (balagnot) for the floor. The houses are traditionally rectangular and raised from the ground 3–5 feet, with one main room for general activities and one window and door. There is usually a separate room (duwag) for visitors or single family members only, opposite the kitchen area. Two stone stoves are on a hearth, one cooks meals for the pigs in a copper cauldron (gambang), the other for the household. Shelves (pagyay) keep household utensils, including wooden bowls (duyo) and camote trays (ballikan or tallaka) made of rattan. Camote peelings (dahdah) or rejects (padiw) are fed to the pigs, which are herded under the living area or in a sty near the house.

The Ikalahan, like many ethnic groups, enjoy using musical instruments in celebration, most of which are made out of bamboo. Gongs (gangha) are the primary instruments used, and are complemented by drums. They also use a native guitar, or galdang, and a vibrating instrument called the pakgong played by striking, besides the Jew's harp (Ko-ling).

For clothing, Ikalahan men wear a loincloth or G-string (kubal), and carry backpacks (akbot) made out of deer hide. Men almost always carry a bolo when leaving the house. Women wear woven skirts (lakba) around the waist, made up of flaps of different color combinations. They wear a blouse from the same material. They use a basket (kayabang) carried on the back for carrying their farming tools. Body ornaments include brass coiled bracelets (gading or batling).

Society authority rests with the elders (nangkaama), with the tongtongan conference being the final say in matters. Feasts include the keleng for healing the sick, ancestor remembrance, and other occasions. A sponsor may also hold a ten-day feast, padit.

The Kalanguya plant and consume talon rice in limited areas. Camote, gabi, beans, bananas, ginger and other fruit trees are also planted. Animals consumed include wild pigs, deer, birds, wild chickens and fishes. Domesticated pigs was not only used for consumption but also as a symbol of wealth while domesticated chicken are used as a source of food during childbirth or illness but is not a part of the regular diet.

== See also ==
- Igorot people
