= List of barangays in Abra (province) =

The province of Abra has 303 barangays comprising its 27 municipalities.

== Barangays ==
Most populous in its respective municipality (as of 2010)

| Barangay | Population | | | | | Municipality |
| Barangay | 2010 | 2007 | 2000 | 1995 | 1990 | Municipality |
|---|---|---|---|---|---|---|
| Abang | 820 | 746 | 704 | 659 | 542 | Bucay |
| Abaquid | 423 | 543 | 408 | 501 | 180 | Danglas |
| Ableg | 175 | 207 | 193 | 156 | 159 | Daguioman |
| Abualan | 885 | 888 | 654 | 599 | 574 | San Juan |
| Agtangao | 2,164 | 2,175 | 1,718 | 1,414 | 1,262 | Bangued |
| Aguet | 288 | 233 | 319 | 371 | 374 | Lagangilang |
| Alangtin | 650 | 651 | 557 | 469 | 451 | Tubo |
| Alaoa | 612 | 515 | 675 | 645 | 490 | Tineg |
| Alinaya | 996 | 892 | 824 | 744 | 670 | Pidigan |
| Ampalioc | 1,177 | 1,127 | 1,055 | 843 | 813 | Luba |
| Amti | 411 | 328 | 326 | 279 | 318 | Boliney |
| Amtuagan | 494 | 454 | 452 | 446 | 485 | Tubo |
| Anayan | 253 | 279 | 308 | 250 | 220 | Tineg |
| Angad | 2,298 | 2,167 | 2,058 | 1,863 | 1,657 | Bangued |
| Ap-apaya | 531 | 474 | 513 | 518 | 447 | Villaviciosa |
| Apao | 268 | 247 | 242 | 154 | 86 | Tineg |
| Arab | 458 | 471 | 416 | 335 | 339 | Pidigan |
| Ayyeng (Poblacion) | 1,567 | 1,532 | 1,340 | 1,201 | 989 | Manabo |
| Ba-i | 851 | 809 | 779 | 803 | 796 | Lagayan |
| Ba-ug | 1,104 | 1,063 | 998 | 859 | 812 | San Juan |
| Baac | 360 | 334 | 289 | 274 | 263 | Langiden |
| Bacag | 233 | 213 | 213 | 185 | 177 | Lacub |
| Bacooc | 379 | 465 | 412 | 353 | 353 | Lagangilang |
| Badas | 463 | 417 | 414 | 354 | 390 | San Juan |
| Bagalay | 937 | 1,007 | 828 | 816 | 693 | Tayum |
| Balais | 533 | 505 | 407 | 397 | 359 | Lagangilang |
| Bañacao | 1,190 | 1,327 | 1,253 | 1,115 | 997 | Bangued |
| Bangbangar | 1,749 | 2,111 | 1,735 | 1,375 | 1,238 | Bangued |
| Bangbangcag | 1,088 | 1,064 | 894 | 975 | 945 | Bucay |
| Bangcagan | 616 | 557 | 562 | 462 | 463 | Bucay |
| Banglolao | 598 | 547 | 505 | 413 | 390 | Bucay |
| Bao-yan | 577 | 440 | 453 | 436 | 420 | Boliney |
| Barit | 572 | 589 | 590 | 573 | 520 | Luba |
| Basbasa | 849 | 831 | 928 | 870 | 862 | Tayum |
| Bayaan | 437 | 447 | 420 | 419 | 396 | Dolores |
| Bayabas | 218 | 194 | 161 | 153 | 146 | Malibcong |
| Bazar | 527 | 590 | 564 | 497 | 626 | Sallapadan |
| Belaat | 252 | 303 | 331 | 283 | 202 | Tineg |
| Benben (Bonbon) | 551 | 473 | 375 | 308 | 254 | La Paz |
| Bilabila | 540 | 535 | 472 | 427 | 383 | Sallapadan |
| Binasaran | 191 | 164 | 177 | 189 | 200 | Malibcong |
| Bol-lilising | 294 | 297 | 237 | 225 | 221 | Villaviciosa |
| Bolbolo | 851 | 829 | 749 | 756 | 734 | Pilar |
| Bonglo (Patagui) | 261 | 223 | 320 | 273 | 222 | Licuan-Baay |
| Brookside | 366 | 356 | 366 | 368 | 334 | Pilar |
| Buanao | 345 | 303 | 432 | 442 | 424 | Malibcong |
| Budac | 1,286 | 1,280 | 1,029 | 1,177 | 1,040 | Tayum |
| Bugbog | 698 | 689 | 576 | 527 | 487 | Bucay |
| Bulbulala | 1,183 | 1,325 | 1,249 | 1,093 | 933 | La Paz |
| Bulbulala | 363 | 241 | 331 | 305 | 370 | Licuan-Baay |
| Buli | 1,453 | 1,260 | 1,123 | 1,079 | 1,188 | La Paz |
| Bumagcat | 794 | 808 | 735 | 734 | 649 | Tayum |
| Buneg | 827 | 881 | 725 | 473 | 631 | Lacub |
| Cabaroan | 561 | 428 | 433 | 449 | 440 | Dolores |
| Cabaroan | 1,251 | 1,276 | 1,081 | 949 | 837 | Tayum |
| Cabaruan | 650 | 621 | 616 | 570 | 507 | Danglas |
| Cabaruyan | 412 | 439 | 394 | 357 | 335 | Daguioman |
| Cabayogan | 301 | 298 | 300 | 316 | 268 | San Isidro |
| Cabcaborao | 1,032 | 852 | 899 | 965 | 902 | San Juan |
| Cabuloan | 1,131 | 1,081 | 1,005 | 886 | 895 | Bangued |
| Caganayan | 1,212 | 1,058 | 1,128 | 1,009 | 665 | Tineg |
| Cal-lao | 931 | 857 | 826 | 801 | 763 | Villaviciosa |
| Calaba | 2,890 | 3,883 | 2,298 | 2,149 | 1,723 | Bangued |
| Calabaoan | 295 | 262 | 191 | 181 | 148 | San Juan |
| Calao | 721 | 669 | 553 | 562 | 476 | Bucay |
| Calumbaya | 434 | 457 | 416 | 399 | 348 | Dolores |
| Canan (Gapan) | 1,155 | 1,162 | 1,209 | 1,136 | 1,053 | La Paz |
| Cardona | 463 | 561 | 460 | 566 | 452 | Dolores |
| Catacdegan Nuevo | 600 | 576 | 529 | 507 | 486 | Manabo |
| Catacdegan Viejo | 473 | 471 | 471 | 413 | 435 | Manabo |
| Caupasan (Poblacion) | 1,398 | 1,523 | 1,031 | 979 | 949 | Danglas |
| Cawayan | 483 | 379 | 392 | 423 | 369 | Licuan-Baay |
| Cayapa | 992 | 937 | 912 | 783 | 759 | Lagangilang |
| Cogon | 488 | 350 | 584 | 506 | 308 | Tineg |
| Collago | 1,049 | 1,023 | 901 | 803 | 815 | Lagayan |
| Cosili East (Proper) | 957 | 876 | 681 | 582 | 585 | Bangued |
| Cosili West (Buaya) | 1,175 | 1,206 | 1,006 | 842 | 816 | Bangued |
| Culiong | 483 | 376 | 386 | 370 | 381 | San Juan |
| Dalaguisen | 840 | 833 | 750 | 729 | 762 | Lagangilang |
| Dalayap (Nalaas) | 470 | 486 | 467 | 423 | 375 | Langiden |
| Dalimag | 767 | 638 | 531 | 524 | 542 | San Isidro |
| Dalit | 773 | 736 | 711 | 685 | 596 | Pilar |
| Danac East | 518 | 459 | 519 | 441 | 618 | Boliney |
| Danac West | 618 | 474 | 491 | 505 | 608 | Boliney |
| Dangdangla | 1,623 | 1,492 | 1,152 | 1,160 | 898 | Bangued |
| Danglas | 479 | 462 | 421 | 478 | 299 | Danglas |
| Dao-angan | 399 | 328 | 330 | 301 | 508 | Boliney |
| Daoidao | 152 | 145 | 122 | 157 | 158 | San Juan |
| Deet | 912 | 852 | 822 | 886 | 859 | Tayum |
| Dilong | 818 | 810 | 751 | 596 | 689 | Tubo |
| Dintan | 357 | 358 | 327 | 315 | 321 | Pilar |
| Domenglay | 417 | 395 | 391 | 377 | 367 | Licuan-Baay |
| Ducligan | 437 | 479 | 464 | 345 | 351 | Bucloc |
| Dugong | 1,532 | 1,377 | 1,386 | 1,384 | 1,301 | Bucay |
| Dulao | 223 | 219 | 288 | 251 | 243 | Malibcong |
| Duldulao | 362 | 294 | 363 | 382 | 351 | Malibcong |
| Dumagas | 387 | 308 | 265 | 274 | 287 | Boliney |
| Dumayco | 1,102 | 1,092 | 918 | 862 | 848 | Peñarrubia |
| Gacab | 433 | 348 | 387 | 402 | 342 | Malibcong |
| Gaddani | 1,325 | 1,284 | 1,387 | 1,360 | 1,082 | Tayum |
| Gangal (Poblacion) | 921 | 909 | 805 | 856 | 610 | Sallapadan |
| Gapang | 630 | 689 | 659 | 610 | 598 | Pilar |
| Garreta | 582 | 639 | 497 | 437 | 426 | Pidigan |
| Gayaman | 1,020 | 1,028 | 1,071 | 913 | 878 | Luba |
| Guimba | 369 | 381 | 384 | 384 | 407 | San Juan |
| Guinguinabang | 290 | 256 | 246 | 213 | 203 | Lacub |
| Immuli | 557 | 585 | 556 | 479 | 501 | Pidigan |
| Isit | 726 | 802 | 657 | 648 | 464 | Dolores |
| Kili | 426 | 424 | 407 | 370 | 398 | Tubo |
| Kilong-Olao | 234 | 183 | 201 | 150 | 284 | Boliney |
| Kimmalaba | 889 | 883 | 856 | 807 | 751 | Dolores |
| Kinabiti | 737 | 833 | 779 | 765 | 717 | Pilar |
| Laang | 797 | 733 | 606 | 591 | 682 | Lagangilang |
| Labaan | 587 | 608 | 531 | 476 | 486 | Bucloc |
| Labaan | 882 | 928 | 868 | 928 | 763 | San Quintin |
| Labon | 632 | 579 | 598 | 536 | 480 | Bucay |
| Lagben | 397 | 464 | 341 | 351 | 351 | Lagangilang |
| Laguiben | 944 | 850 | 733 | 674 | 691 | Lagangilang |
| Lam-ag | 546 | 580 | 563 | 515 | 509 | San Juan |
| Lamao (Poblacion) | 546 | 490 | 500 | 504 | 435 | Bucloc |
| Lan-ag | 353 | 396 | 383 | 305 | 352 | Lacub |
| Lanec | 172 | 131 | 271 | 206 | 173 | Tineg |
| Langbaban | 342 | 333 | 307 | 309 | 298 | San Isidro |
| Lap-lapog | 766 | 738 | 634 | 650 | 614 | Villaviciosa |
| Lapat-Balantay | 356 | 378 | 412 | 360 | 257 | Tineg |
| Laskig | 484 | 499 | 450 | 405 | 367 | Pidigan |
| Lat-ey | 203 | 219 | 283 | 324 | 301 | Malibcong |
| Layugan | 1,002 | 927 | 845 | 753 | 660 | Bucay |
| Lenneng | 359 | 280 | 281 | 299 | 204 | Licuan-Baay |
| Libtec | 638 | 561 | 535 | 475 | 439 | Dolores |
| Lingay | 606 | 650 | 614 | 594 | 660 | Bucloc |
| Lingtan | 862 | 839 | 653 | 534 | 481 | Bangued |
| Lipcan | 1,676 | 1,895 | 1,353 | 1,335 | 1,117 | Bangued |
| Lub-lubba | 295 | 266 | 279 | 284 | 250 | Dolores |
| Lubong | 690 | 708 | 569 | 521 | 538 | Bangued |
| Luguis | 911 | 900 | 813 | 683 | 630 | La Paz |
| Lul-luno | 379 | 394 | 441 | 412 | 433 | Luba |
| Lumaba | 552 | 492 | 515 | 501 | 532 | Villaviciosa |
| Lumobang | 363 | 308 | 245 | 195 | 194 | San Juan |
| Lusuac | 1,053 | 901 | 769 | 657 | 621 | Peñarrubia |
| Luzong | 920 | 893 | 842 | 837 | 794 | Luba |
| Luzong | 1,031 | 1,095 | 945 | 815 | 838 | Manabo |
| Mabungtot | 500 | 510 | 460 | 421 | 389 | Langiden |
| Macarcarmay | 695 | 629 | 622 | 543 | 557 | Bangued |
| Macray | 755 | 641 | 539 | 402 | 439 | Bangued |
| Madalipay | 369 | 304 | 276 | 307 | 279 | Bucay |
| Maguyepyep | 1,113 | 1,251 | 919 | 785 | 739 | Sallapadan |
| Malabbaga | 1,243 | 1,120 | 985 | 963 | 977 | La Paz |
| Malamsit (Pau-Malamsit) | 640 | 577 | 470 | 409 | 412 | Peñarrubia |
| Malapaao | 707 | 657 | 624 | 601 | 483 | Langiden |
| Malibcong (Poblacion) | 567 | 425 | 490 | 541 | 436 | Malibcong |
| Maliplipit | 301 | 294 | 323 | 265 | 274 | Pilar |
| Malita | 373 | 306 | 275 | 306 | 309 | Bangued |
| Manayday | 601 | 581 | 524 | 463 | 462 | San Isidro |
| Maoay | 736 | 626 | 569 | 614 | 549 | Bangued |
| Mapisla | 518 | 353 | 292 | 303 | 338 | Licuan-Baay |
| Mataragan | 526 | 497 | 433 | 419 | 388 | Malibcong |
| Mogao | 349 | 391 | 249 | 297 | 248 | Licuan-Baay |
| Monggoc | 1,101 | 1,231 | 945 | 830 | 862 | Pidigan |
| Mudeng | 1,153 | 1,115 | 877 | 816 | 763 | La Paz |
| Mudiit | 1,439 | 1,362 | 1,143 | 1,118 | 1,083 | Dolores |
| Nagaparan | 819 | 808 | 681 | 638 | 483 | Danglas |
| Nagbukel-Tiquipa | 534 | 573 | 560 | 553 | 551 | Luba |
| Nagcanasan | 259 | 225 | 239 | 235 | 225 | Pilar |
| Naglibacan | 413 | 371 | 430 | 381 | 275 | Tineg |
| Nagtipulan | 1,209 | 1,254 | 1,119 | 1,191 | 883 | Lagangilang |
| Nagtupacan | 1,059 | 1,037 | 931 | 1,009 | 951 | Lagangilang |
| Naguilian | 636 | 721 | 565 | 551 | 504 | Sallapadan |
| Naguirayan | 698 | 558 | 580 | 545 | 464 | Pidigan |
| Nalbuan | 852 | 661 | 600 | 557 | 479 | Licuan-Baay |
| Namara | 284 | 271 | 280 | 326 | 291 | Pilar |
| Namarabar | 548 | 577 | 503 | 499 | 531 | Peñarrubia |
| Namit-ingan | 617 | 411 | 472 | 427 | 342 | Dolores |
| Nanangduan | 329 | 307 | 295 | 293 | 243 | Pilar |
| Nangobongan | 393 | 415 | 346 | 337 | 385 | San Juan |
| North Poblacion | 1,123 | 1,140 | 960 | 924 | 914 | Bucay |
| Ocup | 483 | 455 | 455 | 469 | 376 | Pilar |
| Pacac | 605 | 663 | 527 | 511 | 491 | Dolores |
| Pacgued | 229 | 246 | 248 | 238 | 193 | Malibcong |
| Pacoc | 571 | 500 | 424 | 373 | 343 | Lacub |
| Padangitan | 502 | 658 | 563 | 649 | 309 | Danglas |
| Pagala | 1,262 | 1,106 | 1,103 | 952 | 825 | Bucay |
| Paganao | 342 | 343 | 375 | 339 | 291 | Lagangilang |
| Pakiling | 708 | 664 | 591 | 551 | 489 | Bucay |
| Palang | 589 | 583 | 648 | 620 | 518 | San Quintin |
| Palao | 1,676 | 1,716 | 1,502 | 1,341 | 1,225 | Bangued |
| Palaquio | 994 | 960 | 869 | 969 | 803 | Bucay |
| Pamutic | 566 | 569 | 563 | 539 | 517 | Pidigan |
| Pang-ot | 366 | 315 | 352 | 270 | 292 | Lagayan |
| Pang-ot | 592 | 627 | 582 | 581 | 520 | Pilar |
| Pangal | 463 | 796 | 424 | 470 | 315 | Danglas |
| Pangtud | 1,070 | 863 | 829 | 724 | 617 | Pidigan |
| Pantoc | 422 | 404 | 366 | 321 | 289 | San Isidro |
| Pantoc | 676 | 683 | 641 | 588 | 519 | San Quintin |
| Patad | 306 | 281 | 175 | 265 | 278 | Pilar |
| Patiao | 608 | 576 | 483 | 423 | 351 | Peñarrubia |
| Patoc | 787 | 772 | 848 | 889 | 1,036 | Bucay |
| Pattaoig | 122 | 153 | 106 | 86 | 120 | San Juan |
| Patucannay | 1,411 | 1,234 | 1,164 | 1,049 | 1,016 | Bangued |
| Patucannay | 1,317 | 1,359 | 1,117 | 1,072 | 810 | Tayum |
| Pawa | 360 | 409 | 293 | 324 | 308 | Lagangilang |
| Pias | 1,165 | 1,032 | 956 | 938 | 862 | Tayum |
| Pidipid | 950 | 804 | 680 | 558 | 555 | La Paz |
| Pikek | 313 | 328 | 301 | 261 | 273 | Daguioman |
| Poblacion | 2,257 | 2,071 | 2,202 | 1,994 | 1,725 | Dolores |
| Poblacion | 3,687 | 3,878 | 3,153 | 2,858 | 2,723 | La Paz |
| Poblacion | 1,473 | 1,435 | 1,592 | 1,556 | 1,573 | Lagangilang |
| Poblacion | 1,236 | 1,013 | 907 | 773 | 835 | Lagayan |
| Poblacion | 379 | 409 | 406 | 359 | 343 | Langiden |
| Poblacion | 379 | 292 | 319 | 424 | 297 | Licuan-Baay |
| Poblacion | 1,128 | 1,100 | 999 | 934 | 1,015 | Luba |
| Poblacion | 994 | 1,121 | 981 | 854 | 945 | Peñarrubia |
| Poblacion | 1,703 | 1,599 | 1,516 | 1,498 | 1,266 | Pilar |
| Poblacion | 645 | 643 | 564 | 487 | 496 | San Isidro |
| Poblacion | 741 | 787 | 708 | 748 | 655 | San Quintin |
| Poblacion | 2,645 | 2,530 | 2,342 | 2,348 | 2,174 | Tayum |
| Poblacion | 836 | 806 | 760 | 713 | 762 | Villaviciosa |
| Poblacion (Agsimao) | 642 | 685 | 614 | 518 | 392 | Tineg |
| Poblacion (Boliney) | 919 | 829 | 755 | 770 | 730 | Boliney |
| Poblacion (Mayabo) | 582 | 562 | 452 | 407 | 422 | Tubo |
| Poblacion (Talampac) | 703 | 804 | 791 | 653 | 620 | Lacub |
| Poblacion East | 1,603 | 1,646 | 1,474 | 1,370 | 1,315 | Pidigan |
| Poblacion North | 980 | 858 | 748 | 710 | 777 | San Juan |
| Poblacion South | 542 | 441 | 440 | 467 | 451 | San Juan |
| Poblacion West | 1,228 | 1,162 | 1,057 | 1,034 | 1,113 | Pidigan |
| Presentar | 725 | 694 | 589 | 674 | 579 | Lagangilang |
| Pulot | 975 | 974 | 955 | 763 | 1,033 | Lagayan |
| Quidaoen | 679 | 528 | 648 | 581 | 611 | San Juan |
| Quillat | 754 | 846 | 752 | 651 | 599 | Langiden |
| Quimloong | 526 | 501 | 492 | 476 | 414 | Bucay |
| Riang (Tiang) | 810 | 764 | 682 | 664 | 504 | Peñarrubia |
| Sabangan | 244 | 263 | 250 | 246 | 220 | San Juan |
| Sabnangan | 661 | 659 | 645 | 494 | 559 | Luba |
| Sabtan-olo | 330 | 338 | 323 | 273 | 262 | San Isidro |
| Saccaang | 665 | 716 | 626 | 623 | 560 | Sallapadan |
| Sagap | 775 | 765 | 694 | 708 | 699 | Bangued |
| Sallapadan | 299 | 303 | 326 | 302 | 305 | Sallapadan |
| Salnec | 370 | 361 | 320 | 358 | 380 | Bucay |
| Salucag | 551 | 404 | 398 | 365 | 383 | Dolores |
| San Antonio | 913 | 901 | 813 | 784 | 768 | Bangued |
| San Diego | 442 | 449 | 393 | 315 | 307 | Pidigan |
| San Gregorio | 1,178 | 1,340 | 1,204 | 1,048 | 975 | La Paz |
| San Isidro | 1,415 | 1,483 | 1,157 | 1,146 | 976 | Lagangilang |
| San Jose Norte | 604 | 564 | 534 | 448 | 489 | Manabo |
| San Jose Sur | 535 | 565 | 484 | 473 | 473 | Manabo |
| San Juan East | 338 | 331 | 332 | 348 | 315 | Pilar |
| San Juan Norte | 632 | 525 | 556 | 508 | 494 | Manabo |
| San Juan Sur | 724 | 721 | 645 | 587 | 600 | Manabo |
| San Juan West | 602 | 658 | 616 | 545 | 535 | Pilar |
| San Marcial | 769 | 725 | 629 | 560 | 498 | San Isidro |
| San Miguel | 653 | 688 | 635 | 566 | 554 | Bucay |
| San Ramon East | 2,185 | 2,115 | 1,772 | 1,600 | 906 | Manabo |
| San Ramon West | 1,960 | 1,973 | 1,982 | 1,770 | 1,776 | Manabo |
| Santa Rosa | 1,784 | 1,933 | 1,459 | 1,176 | 1,051 | Bangued |
| Santa Rosa | 382 | 417 | 336 | 340 | 339 | Peñarrubia |
| Santo Tomas | 445 | 401 | 385 | 311 | 311 | Manabo |
| Sao-atan | 976 | 805 | 779 | 734 | 691 | Bangued |
| Sappaac | 1,238 | 1,251 | 995 | 1,035 | 940 | Bangued |
| Siblong | 972 | 897 | 745 | 751 | 633 | Bucay |
| Silet | 495 | 489 | 445 | 396 | 394 | San Juan |
| South Balioag | 470 | 478 | 519 | 453 | 440 | Pilar |
| South Poblacion | 579 | 579 | 492 | 484 | 453 | Bucay |
| Subagan | 525 | 496 | 416 | 384 | 456 | Licuan-Baay |
| Subusob | 805 | 824 | 723 | 759 | 667 | Sallapadan |
| Sulbec | 675 | 657 | 632 | 500 | 468 | Pidigan |
| Supi-il | 680 | 643 | 439 | 443 | 402 | San Juan |
| Supo | 732 | 658 | 633 | 506 | 519 | Tubo |
| Suyo (Malidong) | 625 | 653 | 561 | 484 | 484 | Pidigan |
| Tabacda | 246 | 255 | 255 | 205 | 197 | Tubo |
| Tabiog | 1,076 | 1,139 | 927 | 1,001 | 822 | Bucay |
| Tablac (Calot) | 1,408 | 1,015 | 1,094 | 954 | 968 | Bangued |
| Tagaytay | 719 | 652 | 543 | 616 | 610 | San Juan |
| Tagodtod | 1,617 | 1,399 | 1,182 | 1,122 | 1,035 | Lagangilang |
| Talogtog | 1,162 | 1,083 | 777 | 661 | 680 | Dolores |
| Tamac | 627 | 648 | 585 | 514 | 500 | Villaviciosa |
| Tangadan | 1,362 | 1,331 | 1,274 | 1,238 | 1,127 | San Quintin |
| Tangbao | 711 | 687 | 749 | 589 | 629 | San Isidro |
| Taping | 425 | 388 | 374 | 437 | 333 | Dolores |
| Taping | 454 | 416 | 355 | 413 | 321 | Lagangilang |
| Taripan | 232 | 188 | 211 | 221 | 214 | Malibcong |
| Tattawa | 407 | 418 | 373 | 340 | 342 | Peñarrubia |
| Tiempo | 800 | 805 | 737 | 640 | 667 | Tubo |
| Tikitik | 272 | 234 | 211 | 209 | 178 | Pilar |
| Toon | 928 | 844 | 822 | 819 | 862 | La Paz |
| Tubtuba | 491 | 537 | 412 | 368 | 413 | Tubo |
| Tui (Poblacion) | 815 | 942 | 860 | 701 | 646 | Daguioman |
| Tumalip | 358 | 279 | 221 | 224 | 347 | Licuan-Baay |
| Tuquib | 840 | 835 | 807 | 712 | 773 | Villaviciosa |
| Ud-udiao | 479 | 521 | 497 | 503 | 547 | Sallapadan |
| Udangan | 490 | 437 | 432 | 395 | 327 | La Paz |
| Umnap | 278 | 257 | 333 | 308 | 256 | Malibcong |
| Velasco | 1,459 | 1,101 | 1,314 | 1,196 | 1,177 | Tayum |
| Villa Mercedes | 983 | 1,029 | 991 | 877 | 711 | San Quintin |
| Villavieja | 255 | 231 | 194 | 197 | 210 | Pilar |
| Wayangan | 480 | 432 | 388 | 337 | 348 | Tubo |
| Yuyeng | 443 | 406 | 406 | 357 | 357 | Pidigan |
| Zone 1 Poblacion (Nalasin) | 2,017 | 2,057 | 1,570 | 1,169 | 1,300 | Bangued |
| Zone 2 Poblacion (Consiliman) | 1,325 | 1,302 | 1,362 | 1,316 | 1,597 | Bangued |
| Zone 3 Poblacion (Lalaud) | 1,622 | 1,792 | 1,717 | 1,636 | 1,702 | Bangued |
| Zone 4 Poblacion (Town Proper) | 1,040 | 1,234 | 1,198 | 1,274 | 1,542 | Bangued |
| Zone 5 Poblacion (Bo. Barikir) | 2,277 | 2,807 | 2,592 | 2,340 | 2,544 | Bangued |
| Zone 6 Poblacion (Sinapangan) | 1,789 | 2,312 | 2,025 | 2,107 | 2,124 | Bangued |
| Zone 7 Poblacion (Baliling) | 2,721 | 3,093 | 2,515 | 2,186 | 1,956 | Bangued |
| Barangay | 2010 | 2007 | 2000 | 1995 | 1990 | Municipality |
*Italicized names are former names.

[top]
