= Tineg =

Municipality in Abra, Philippines

- Municipality
- Municipality of Tineg
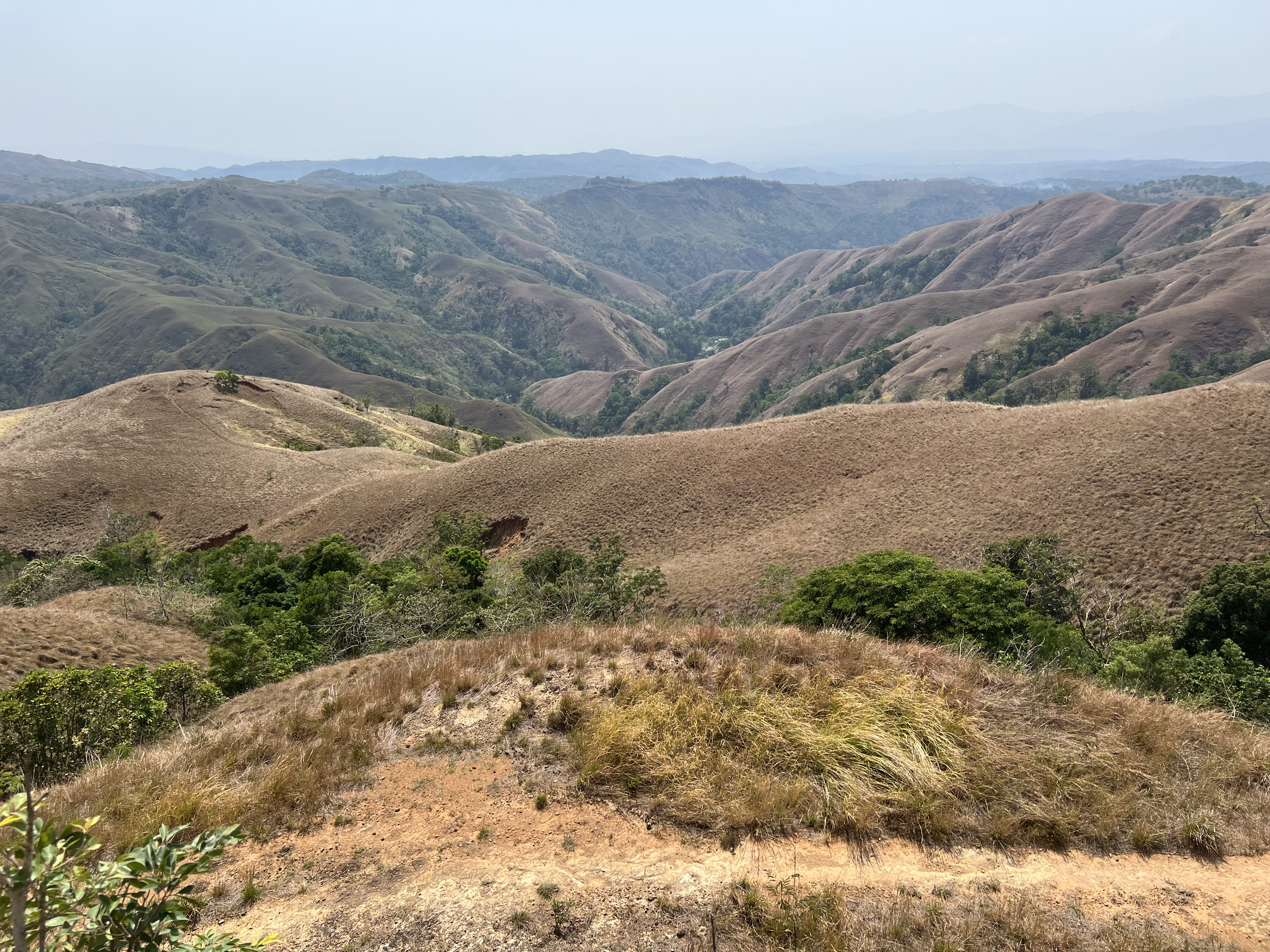
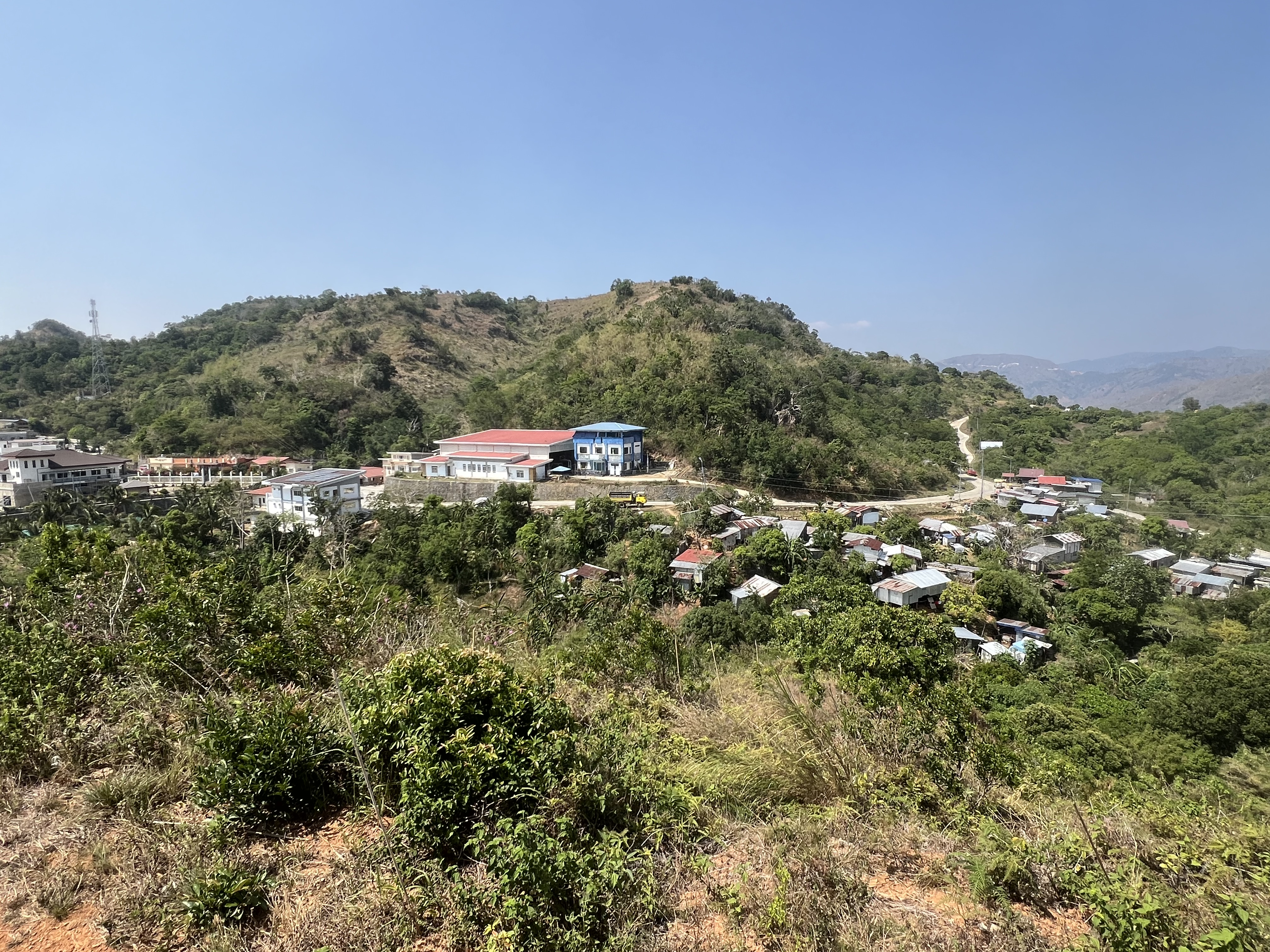
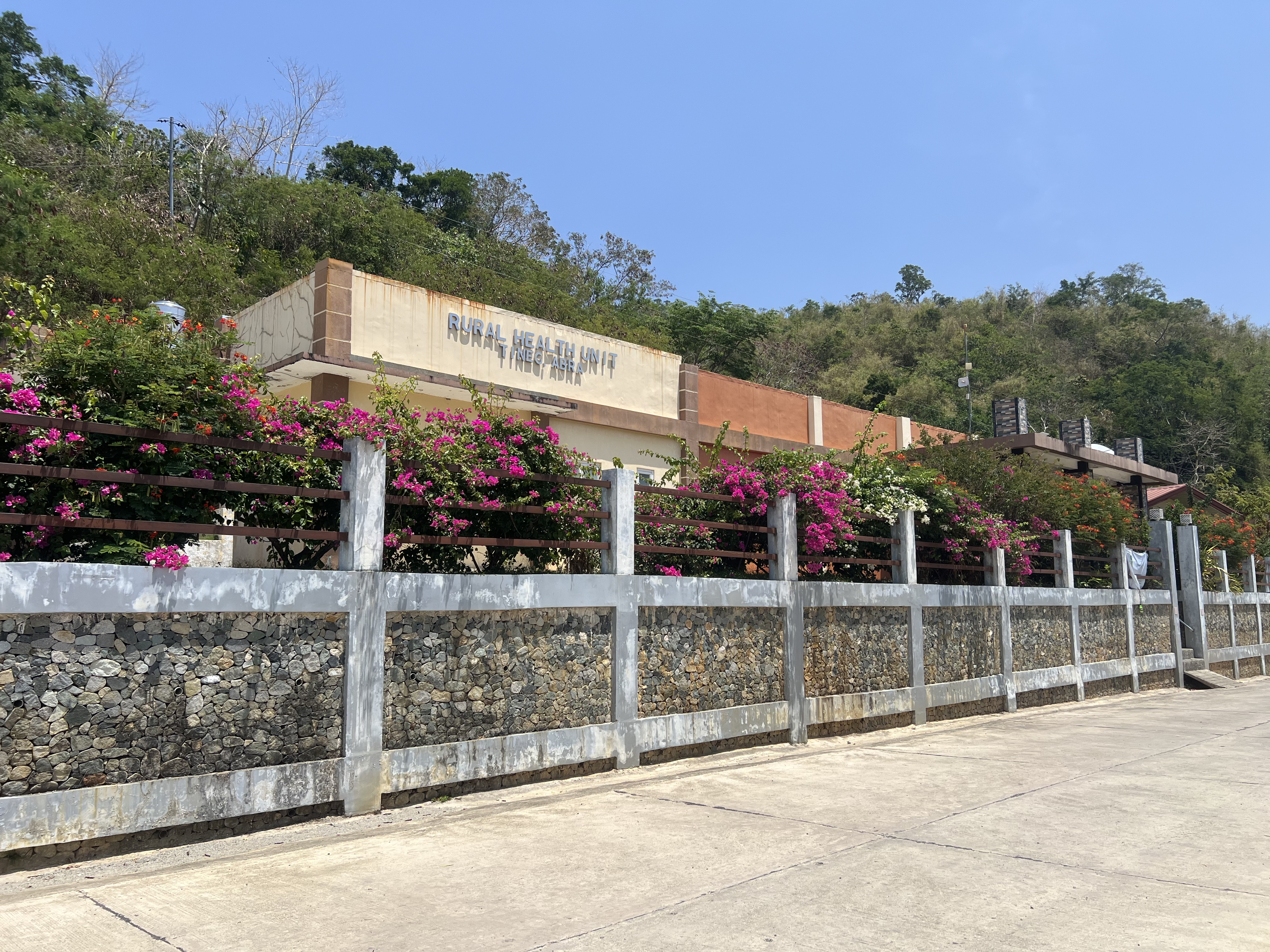
- Apao Rolling Hills Barangay Alaoa Rural Health Unit

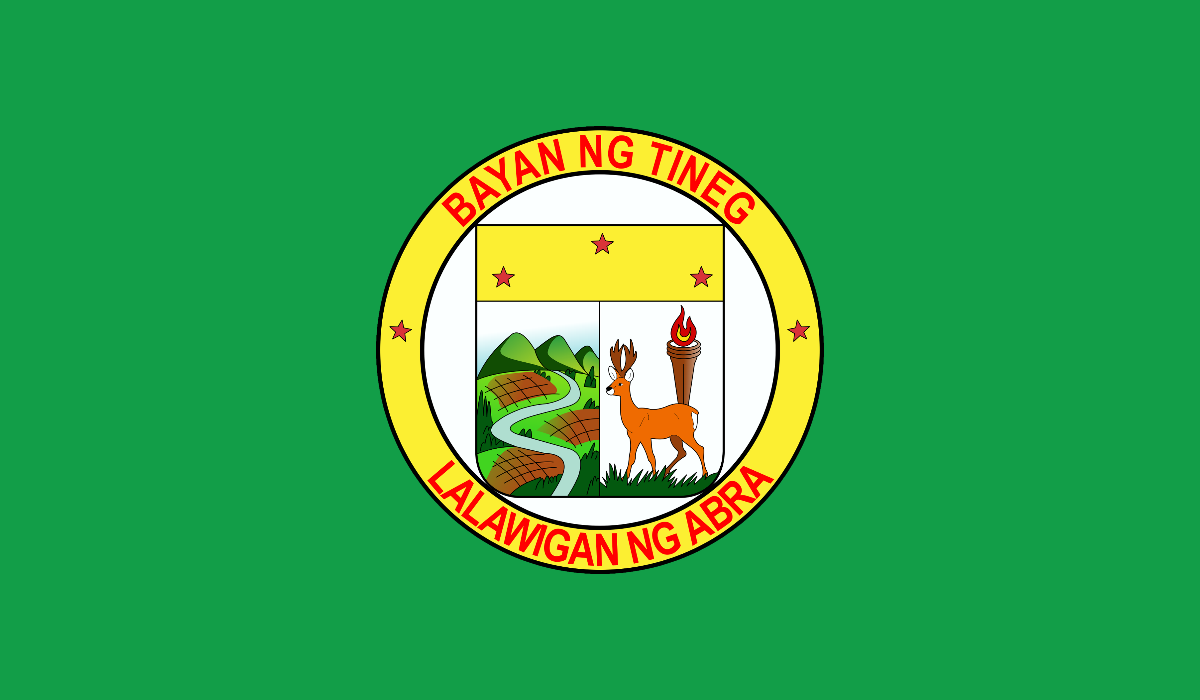
- Flag Seal

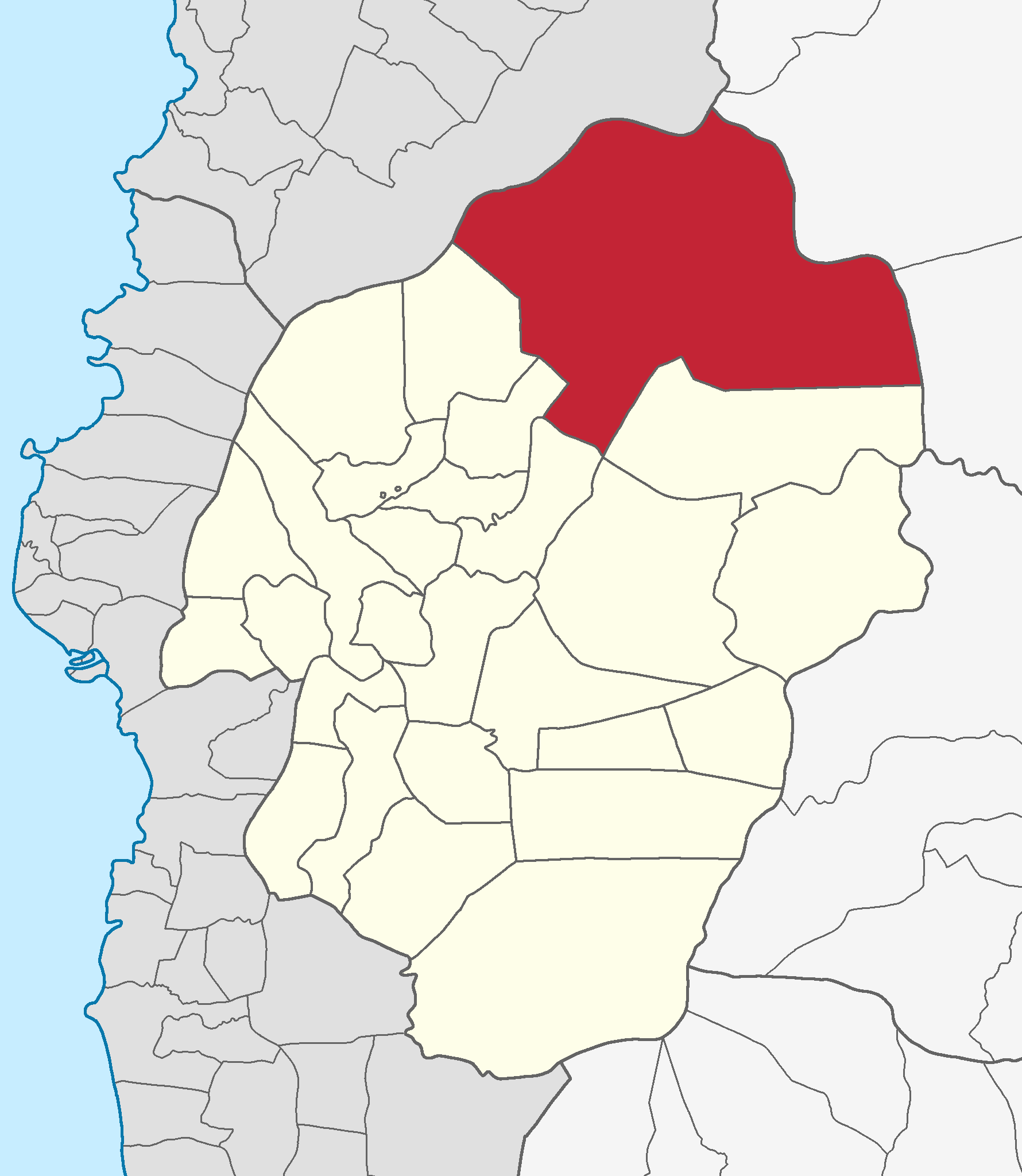
- Map of Abra with Tineg highlighted
- Interactive map of Tineg
- Location within the Philippines
- Coordinates: 17°47′N 120°56′E
- Country: Philippines
- Region: Cordillera Administrative Region
- Province: Abra
- District: Lone district
- Barangays: 10 (see Barangays)

Government
  - Type: Sangguniang Bayan
  - Mayor: Edwin B. Crisologo Sr.
  - Vice Mayor: Corinthia "Coring" D. Crisologo
  - Representative: Joseph Santo Niño B. Bernos
  - Municipal Council: Members: Brethen Jireeh G. Crisologo; Boyet V. Ayaba; Nover C. Calubing; Zenaida B. Inon; Richard U. Batawang; Jonathan G. Benwagen; Melinda C. Guidang; Randolph W. Valencia
  - Electorate: 3,074 voters (2025)

Area
  - Total: 744.8 km^{2} (287.6 sq mi)
- Elevation: 835 m (2,740 ft)
- Highest elevation: 1,562 m (5,125 ft)
- Lowest elevation: 421 m (1,381 ft)

Population (2024 census)
  - Total: 5,059
  - Density: 6.792/km^{2} (17.59/sq mi)
  - Households: 875

Economy
  - Income class: 1st municipal income class
  - Poverty incidence: 66.26% (2023)
  - Revenue: ₱ 304.9 million (2022)
  - Assets: ₱ 936.9 million (2022)
  - Expenditure: ₱ 165.4 million (2022)
  - Liabilities: ₱ 129.9 million (2022)

Service provider
  - Electricity: Abra Electric Cooperative (ABRECO)
- Time zone: UTC+8 (PST)
- ZIP code: 2822
- PSGC: 1400125000
- IDD : area code: +63 (0)74
- Native languages: Isnag; Itneg; Ilocano; Tagalog

Tineg, officially the Municipality of Tineg (Ilocano: Ili ti Tineg; Adasen: Ili niye Tineg; Tagalog: Bayan ng Tineg), is a municipality in the province of Abra, Philippines. According to the 2024 census, it has a population of 5,059 people.

== History ==
=== Spanish and American era ===
It is believed that during the 16th century, Tineg was founded by Dao-ayan and his wife, who found their way to the headwaters of the Tineg River upon crossing the Cordillera from the Apnaya in the Cagayan Valley. During the Spanish era, Tineg was placed under the town of Dolores. However, in 1918, after Abra officially became a province, Tineg became its own separate municipality. Alawa used to be a separate municipality in the same year but was eventually annexed into Tineg after independence.

=== World War II ===
During World War II, the people of Tineg contributed greatly to the anti-Japanese resistance. In reprisal for the death of the Japanese soldier Okabe on 2 January 1943, Japanese forces massacred 93 civilians in Tineg and Lanek on 31 March of the same year. Following this act, most people from Tineg and Lanek began hiding in the jungles.

=== Marcos era ===
During the martial law period, the New People's Army began recruiting villagers from the towns of Tineg, Lacub and Malibcong against the timber company Cellophil, which was destroying the natural resources of the region. The region eventually became a hotbed of insurgency, and the Philippine Constabulary responded by wiping out the small communist band in August 1979, killing 5 and capturing 4 of them, thereby hindering communist activities in the region for a long time.

=== Contemporary era ===
On October 29, 2002, Mayor Clarence Benwaren was assassinated by a gunman while he was attending a wedding ceremony in Calauan, Laguna.

== Geography ==
According to the Philippine Statistics Authority, the municipality has a land area of 744.80 square kilometres (287.57 sq mi) constituting 17.88% of the 744.80-square-kilometre- (287.57 sq mi) total area of Abra. Tineg is one of the most largest munincipalities in Abra. Tineg boundaries will be the province of the Apayao to the northeast and province of the Ilocos Norte to the north and northwest. Tineg is located at 17°47′N 120°56′E.

Tineg is situated 73.49 kilometres (45.66 mi) from the provincial capital Bangued, and 479.33 kilometres (297.84 mi) from the country's capital city of Manila.

=== Climate ===
Climate data for Tineg, Abra
Month	Jan	Feb	Mar	Apr	May	Jun	Jul	Aug	Sep	Oct	Nov	Dec	Year
Mean daily maximum °C (°F)	23 (73)	25 (77)	27 (81)	29 (84)	28 (82)	28 (82)	27 (81)	26 (79)	26 (79)	26 (79)	25 (77)	23 (73)	26 (79)
Mean daily minimum °C (°F)	16 (61)	16 (61)	17 (63)	19 (66)	21 (70)	21 (70)	21 (70)	21 (70)	20 (68)	19 (66)	18 (64)	17 (63)	19 (66)
Average precipitation mm (inches)	24 (0.9)	26 (1.0)	25 (1.0)	43 (1.7)	159 (6.3)	180 (7.1)	204 (8.0)	207 (8.1)	183 (7.2)	185 (7.3)	91 (3.6)	67 (2.6)	1,394 (54.8)
Average rainy days	8.2	8.7	10.1	13.7	22.3	24.3	25.3	23.5	22.2	16.4	14.1	12.7	201.5
Source: Meteoblue

The climate is characterized by two distinct seasons. The dry season which occurs from November to April, is marked by daily blue skies and clear starry nights and the wet season for the rest of the year with high rainfall intensities accompanied by storms and typhoons.

=== Barangays ===
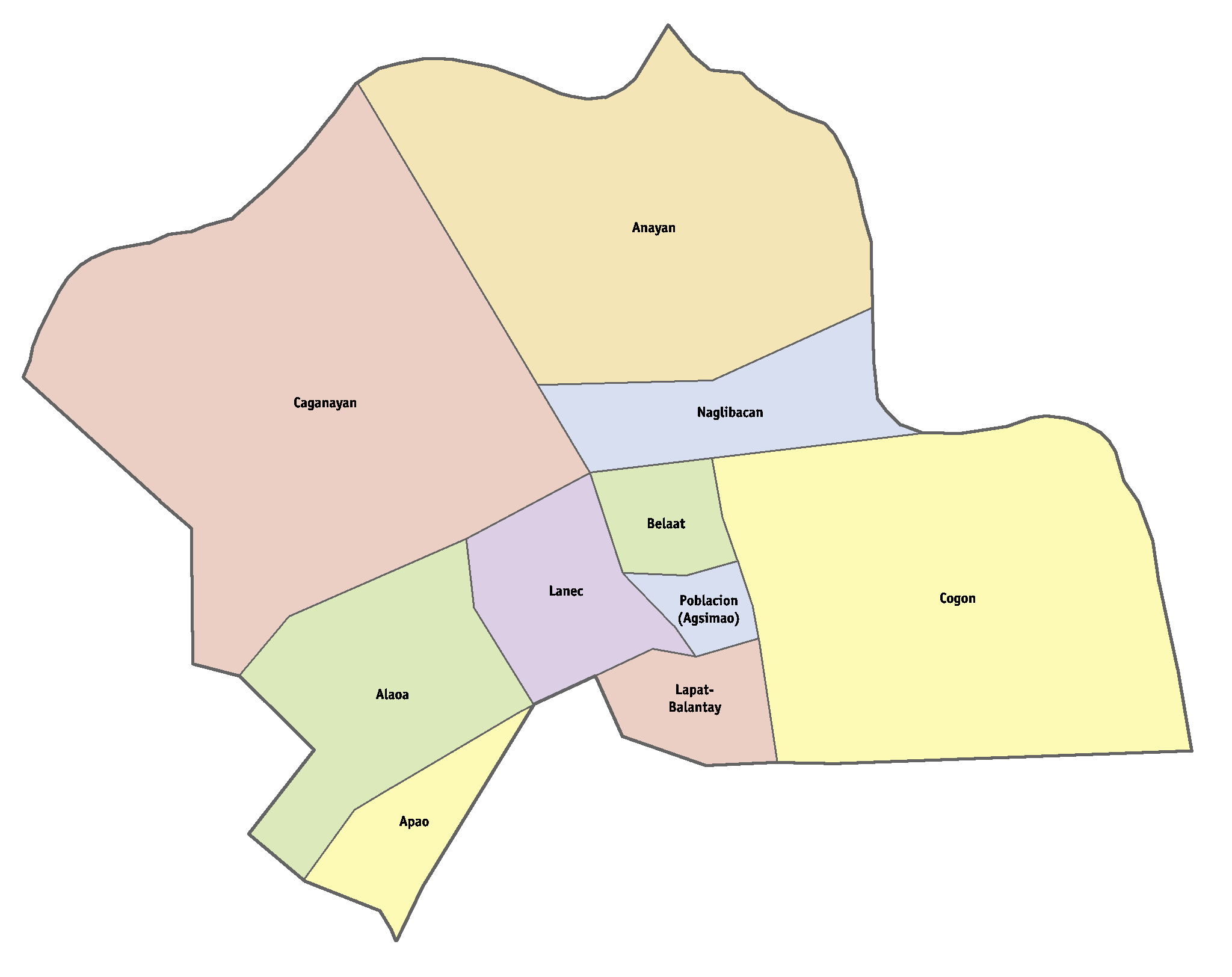
Political map of Tineg

Tineg is politically subdivided into 10 barangays. Each barangay consists of puroks and some have sitios.

PSGC	Barangay	Population			±% p.a.	
		2024		2010		
140125002	Alaoa	16.5%	837	612	▴	2.19%
140125003	Anayan	4.6%	235	253	▾	−0.51%
140125004	Apao	5.4%	274	268	▴	0.15%
140125005	Belaat	4.8%	243	252	▾	−0.25%
140125006	Caganayan	23.8%	1,206	1,212	▾	−0.03%
140125007	Cogon	10.8%	548	488	▴	0.81%
140125008	Lanec	3.2%	162	172	▾	−0.41%
140125009	Lapat-Balantay	7.8%	395	356	▴	0.72%
140125010	Naglibacan	7.2%	365	413	▾	−0.85%
140125001	Poblacion (Agsimao)	14.1%	712	642	▴	0.72%
	Total		5,059	4,977	▴	0.11%

== Demographics ==
Population census of Tineg
Year	Pop.	±% p.a.
1918	751	—
1939	1,512	+3.39%
1948	1,425	−0.66%
1960	1,871	+2.29%
1970	2,254	+1.88%
1975	2,432	+1.54%
1980	2,988	+4.20%
1990	3,068	+0.26%
1995	4,312	+6.59%
2000	4,995	+3.20%
2007	4,317	−1.99%
2010	4,668	+2.89%
2015	5,097	+1.69%
2020	4,977	−0.50%
2024	5,059	+0.39%
Source: Philippine Statistics Authority

In the 2024 census, Tineg had a population of 5,059 people. The population density was 6.8 inhabitants per square kilometre (18/sq mi).

== Economy ==
Poverty incidence of Tineg (%)

Source: Philippine Statistics Authority

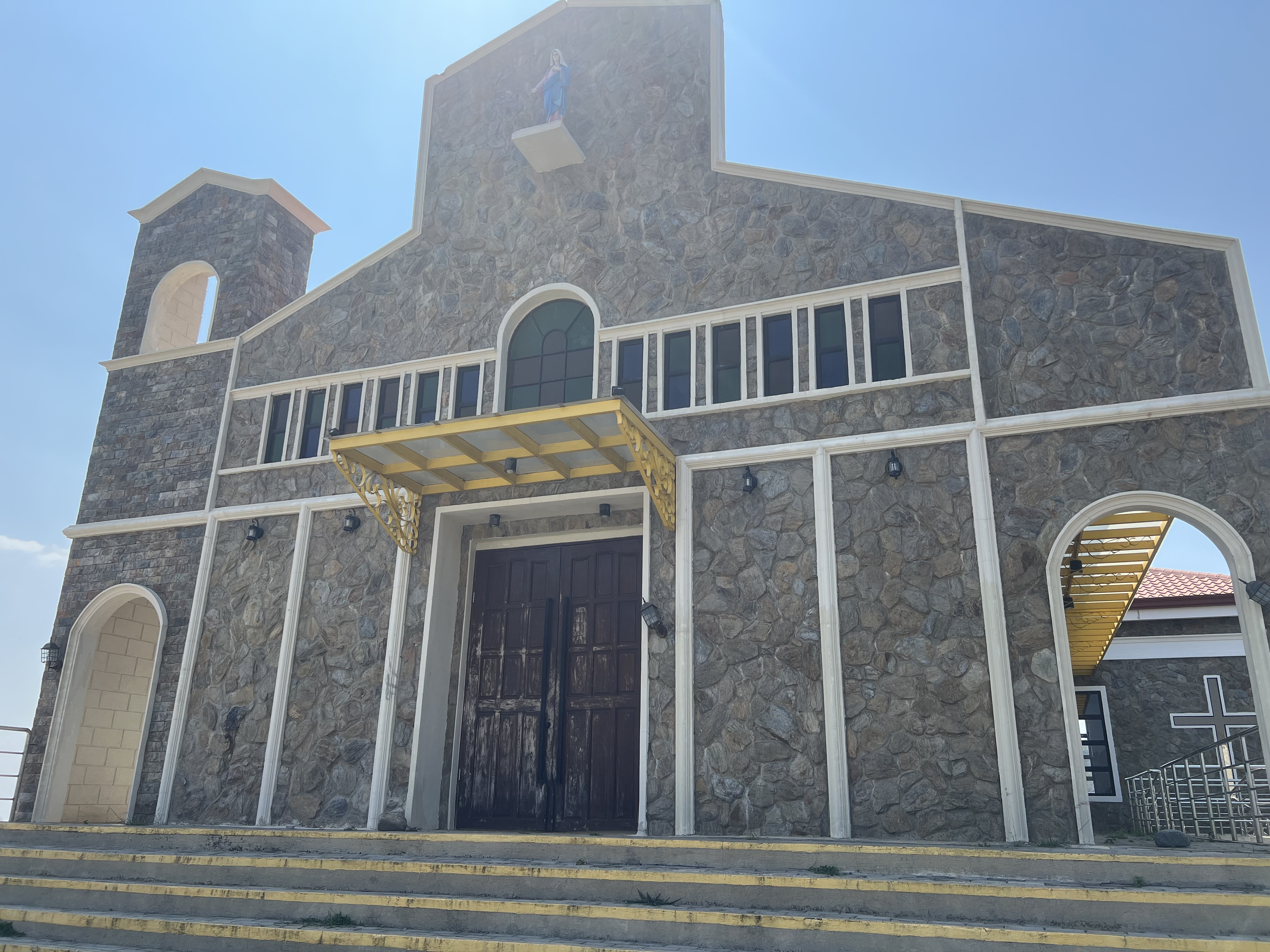
St. Padre Pio Chapel, Vira, Brgy. Alaoa

Tineg has a rural economy that focuses on agriculture, micro-enterprises, and agroforestry initiatives. The agriculture of Tineg involves valley-bottom wet-rice cultivation, root crop planting, and localized vegetable production. Tineg launches agricultural programs such as gardening and water harvesting in remote areas. Tineg features forest and natural resources that acts as an important ecological repository.

In Tineg, cottage industries are predominant such as bamboo and rattan crafts. It also has a number of forest resources such as wood, bamboos (like buho, bayog, and hiling), pine, rattan, and tiger grass.

== Government ==
=== Local government ===
Tineg, belonging to the lone congressional district of the province of Abra, is governed by a mayor designated as its local chief executive and by a municipal council as its legislative body in accordance with the Local Government Code. The mayor, vice mayor, and the councilors are elected directly by the people through an election which is being held every three years.

=== Elected officials ===
Members of the Municipal Council (2025–2028)
Position	Name
Congressman	Joseph Santo Niño B. Bernos
Mayor	Edwin B. Crisologo Sr.
Vice-Mayor	Corinthia D. Crisologo
Councilors	Brethen Jireeh G. Crisologo
Councilors	Boyet V. Ayaba
Councilors	Nover C. Calubing
Councilors	Zenaida B. Inon
Councilors	Richard U. Batawang
Councilors	Jonathan G. Benwagen
Councilors	Melinda C. Guidang
Councilors	Randolph W. Valencia

== Attractions ==
There are several waterfalls in Tineg, which include the Cabato Falls, Guirem Falls, Anito Falls, and Kaparkan Falls.

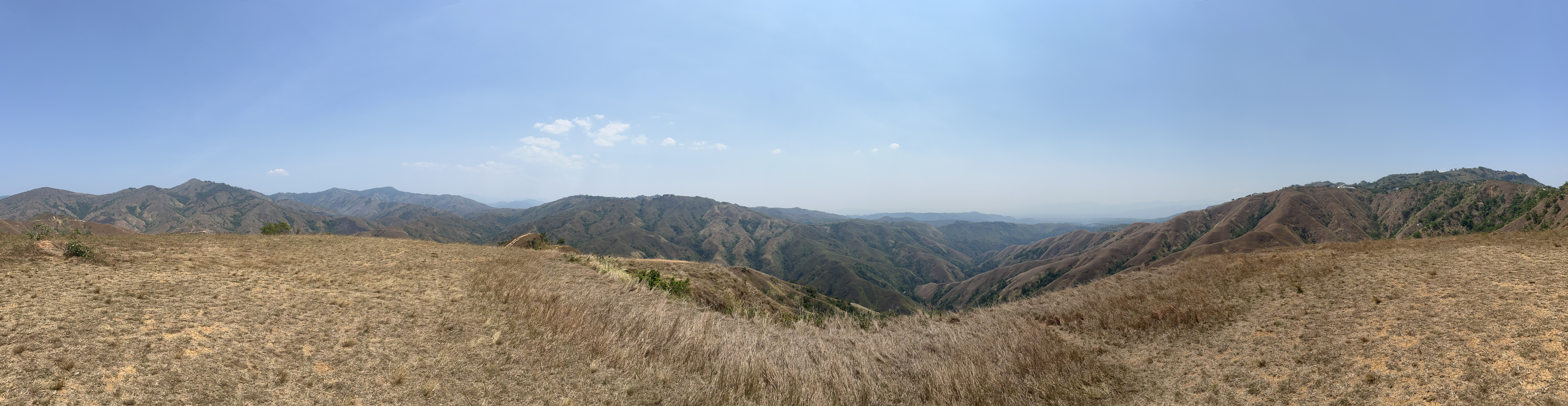
Panorama of the Apao Rolling Hills

== Education ==
The Tineg Schools District Office governs all educational institutions within the municipality. It oversees the management and operations of all private and public, from primary to secondary schools.

=== Primary and elementary schools ===
- Alawa Elementary school
- Anayan Elementary School
- Apao Primary School
- Belaat Elementary School
- Caganayan Elementary School
- Cogon Elementary School
- Laba Primary School
- Magsalang Primary School
- Makingag Elementary School
- Sabangan Elementary School
- Tapayen Elementary School
- Tineg Central School

=== Secondary schools ===
- Caganayan National High School
- Naglibacan Integrated School
- Tineg National High School
