= Danglas =

Municipality in Abra, Philippines

- Municipality
- Municipality of Danglas
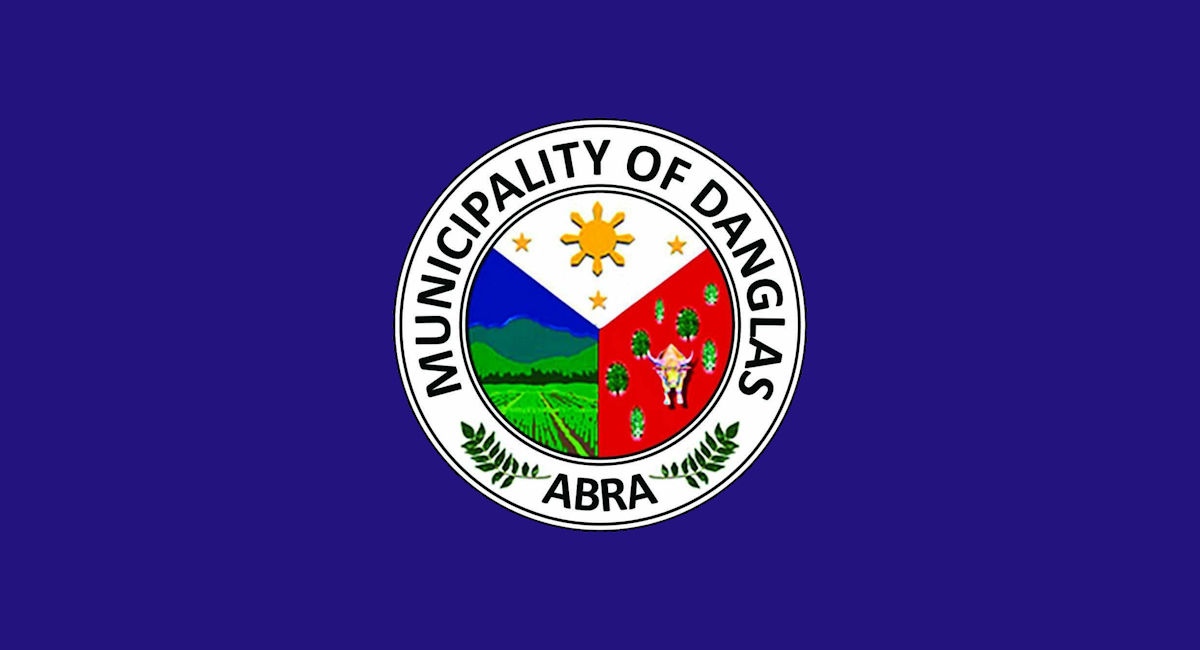
- Flag Seal

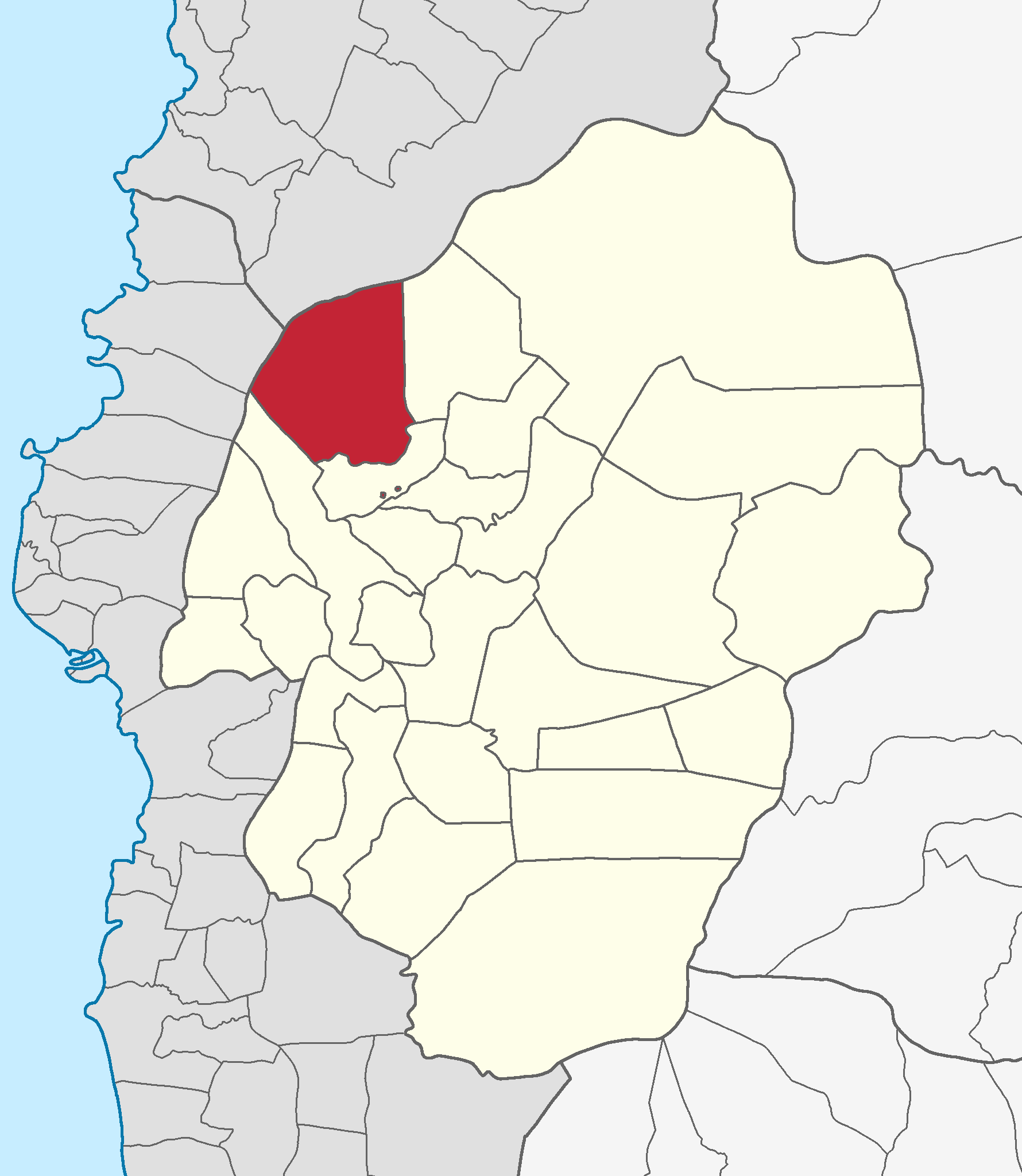
- Map of Abra with Danglas highlighted
- Interactive map of Danglas
- Location within the Philippines
- Coordinates: 17°41′35″N 120°39′55″E
- Country: Philippines
- Region: Cordillera Administrative Region
- Province: Abra
- District: Lone district
- Barangays: 7 (see Barangays)

Government
  - Type: Sangguniang Bayan
  - Mayor: Esther B. Bernos
  - Vice Mayor: Russell A. Bragas
  - Representative: Joseph Santo Niño B. Bernos
  - Municipal Council: Members: Joanette B. Cay-an; Bobby L. Valera; Genaro B. Alita; Quirino B. Bayle Jr.; Dominador S. Acnam; Godofredo M. Lopido Jr.; Jomar B. Layugan; Maria Elena A. Jenkins
  - Electorate: 3,740 voters (2025)

Area
  - Total: 156.02 km^{2} (60.24 sq mi)
- Elevation: 161 m (528 ft)
- Highest elevation: 812 m (2,664 ft)
- Lowest elevation: 44 m (144 ft)

Population (2024 census)
  - Total: 4,372
  - Density: 28.02/km^{2} (72.58/sq mi)
  - Households: 989

Economy
  - Income class: 3rd municipal income class
  - Poverty incidence: 10.41% (2023)
  - Revenue: ₱ 142.7 million (2022)
  - Assets: ₱ 347.8 million (2022)
  - Expenditure: ₱ 110.6 million (2022)
  - Liabilities: ₱ 50.59 million (2022)

Service provider
  - Electricity: Abra Electric Cooperative (ABRECO)
- Time zone: UTC+8 (PST)
- ZIP code: 2825
- PSGC: 1400106000
- IDD : area code: +63 (0)74
- Native languages: Itneg, Ilocano, Filipino

Danglas, officially the Municipality of Danglas (Ilocano: Ili ti Danglas; Filipino: Bayan ng Danglas), is a municipality in the province of Abra, Philippines. According to the 2024 census, it has a population of 4,372 people.

== Geography ==
According to the Philippine Statistics Authority, the municipality has a land area of 156.02 square kilometres (60.24 sq mi) constituting 3.75% of the 4,165.25-square-kilometre- (1,608.21 sq mi) total area of Abra.

Danglas is situated 14.53 kilometres (9.03 mi) from the provincial capital Bangued, and 420.37 kilometres (261.21 mi) from the country's capital city of Manila.

=== Climate ===
Climate data for Danglas, Abra
Month	Jan	Feb	Mar	Apr	May	Jun	Jul	Aug	Sep	Oct	Nov	Dec	Year
Mean daily maximum °C (°F)	29 (84)	30 (86)	32 (90)	33 (91)	32 (90)	31 (88)	30 (86)	29 (84)	30 (86)	30 (86)	30 (86)	29 (84)	30 (87)
Mean daily minimum °C (°F)	18 (64)	19 (66)	20 (68)	22 (72)	24 (75)	24 (75)	24 (75)	24 (75)	23 (73)	22 (72)	20 (68)	19 (66)	22 (71)
Average precipitation mm (inches)	9 (0.4)	11 (0.4)	13 (0.5)	23 (0.9)	92 (3.6)	122 (4.8)	153 (6.0)	137 (5.4)	139 (5.5)	141 (5.6)	42 (1.7)	14 (0.6)	896 (35.4)
Average rainy days	4.6	4.0	6.2	9.1	19.5	23.2	24.0	22.5	21.5	15.2	10.5	6.0	166.3
Source: Meteoblue (modeled/calculated data, not measured locally)

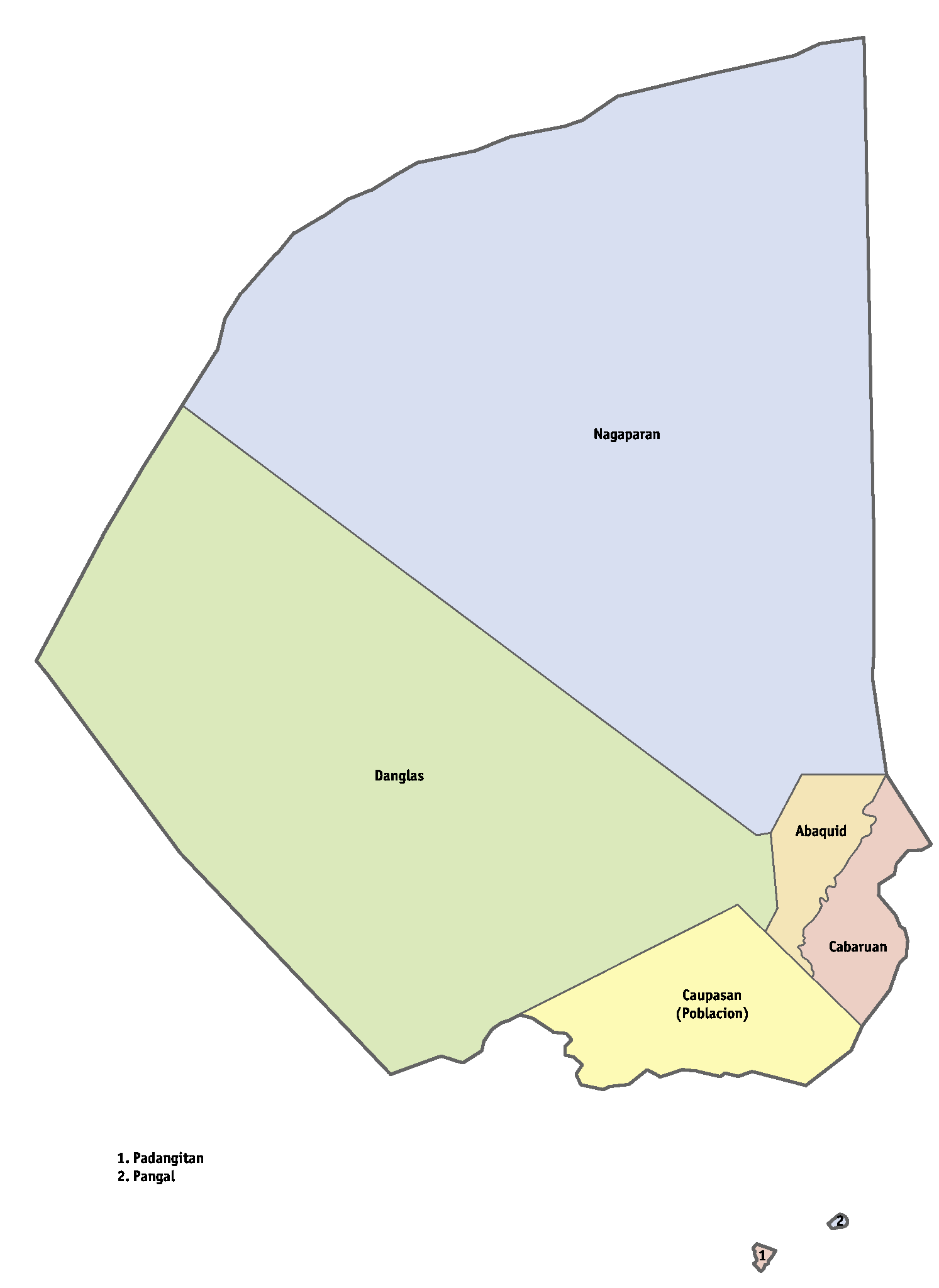
Political map of Danglas

=== Barangays ===
Danglas is politically subdivided into 7 barangays. Each barangay consists of puroks and some have sitios.

PSGC	Barangay	Population			±% p.a.	
		2024		2010		
140106001	Abaquid	7.6%	331	423	▾	−1.69%
140106003	Cabaruan	14.8%	648	650	▾	−0.02%
140106004	Caupasan (Poblacion)	27.2%	1,189	1,398	▾	−1.12%
140106005	Danglas	9.1%	396	479	▾	−1.31%
140106006	Nagaparan	18.9%	827	819	▴	0.07%
140106007	Padangitan	9.5%	417	502	▾	−1.28%
140106008	Pangal	6.1%	266	463	▾	−3.77%
	Total		4,372	4,074	▴	0.49%

== Demographics ==
Population census of Danglas
Year	Pop.	±% p.a.
1918	2,108	—
1939	1,794	−0.77%
1948	1,738	−0.35%
1960	2,475	+2.99%
1970	2,508	+0.13%
1975	2,572	+0.51%
1980	2,657	+0.65%
1990	3,042	+1.36%
1995	4,285	+6.63%
2000	4,144	−0.71%
2007	5,411	+3.75%
2010	4,734	−4.75%
2015	4,192	−2.29%
2020	4,074	−0.60%
2024	4,372	+1.71%
Source: Philippine Statistics Authority

In the 2024 census, Danglas had a population of 4,372 people. The population density was 28 inhabitants per square kilometre (73/sq mi).

== Economy ==
Poverty incidence of Danglas (%)

Source: Philippine Statistics Authority

The economy of Danglas is heavily dependent on agriculture particularly palay, corn, vegetables and fruits. Other raw materials include rattan and bamboos.

== Government ==
=== Local government ===
Danglas, belonging to the lone congressional district of the province of Abra, is governed by a mayor designated as its local chief executive and by a municipal council as its legislative body in accordance with the Local Government Code. The mayor, vice mayor, and the councilors are elected directly by the people through an election which is being held every three years.

=== Elected officials ===
Members of the Municipal Council (2025–2028)
Position	Name
Congressman	Joseph Santo Niño B. Bernos
Mayor	Esther B. Bernos
Vice-Mayor	Russell A. Bragas
Councilors	Joanette B. Cay-an
Councilors	Genaro B. Alita
Councilors	Quirino B. Bayle, Jr.
Councilors	Dominador S. Acnam
Councilors	Bobby L. Valera
Councilors	Godofredo M. Lopido, Jr.
Councilors	Jomar B. Layugan
Councilors	Maria Elena A. Jenkins

== Education ==
The Danglas Schools District Office governs all educational institutions within the municipality. It oversees the management and operations of all private and public, from primary to secondary schools.

=== Primary and elementary schools ===
- Abaquid Elementary School
- Danglas Central School
- Manganip Elementary School
- Nagaparan Elementary School
- Padangitan Elementary School

=== Secondary school ===
- Western Abra National High School
