= Langiden =

Municipality in Abra, Philippines

- Municipality
- Municipality of Langiden
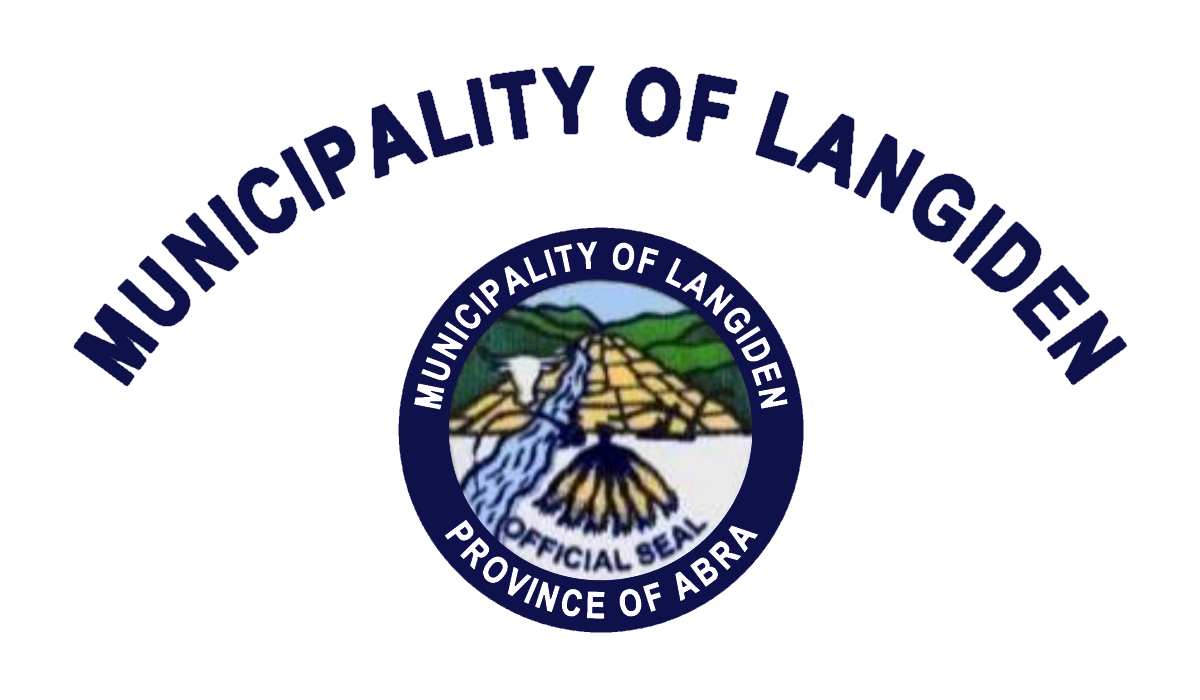
- Flag

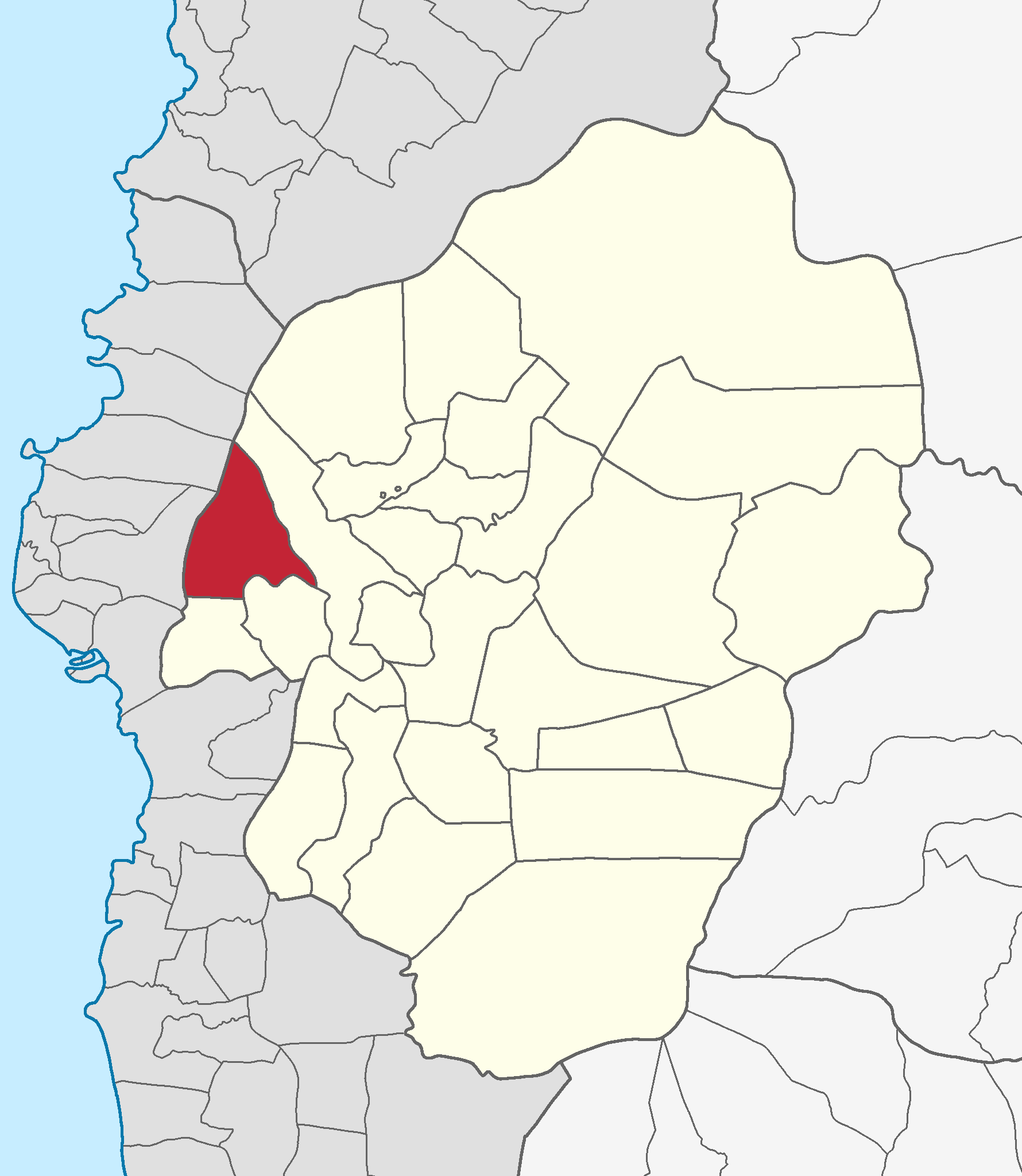
- Map of Abra with Langiden highlighted
- Interactive map of Langiden
- Location within the Philippines
- Coordinates: 17°35′N 120°34′E
- Country: Philippines
- Region: Cordillera Administrative Region
- Province: Abra
- District: Lone district
- Barangays: 6 (see Barangays)

Government
  - Type: Sangguniang Bayan
  - Mayor: Secel B. Palecpec
  - Vice Mayor: Mary A. Bueno
  - Representative: Joseph Santo Niño B. Bernos
  - Municipal Council: Members: Johnzel B. Palecpec; Charles R. Estimo; Jovito A. Bisares; Ruben G. Castillo; Debbie D. Papagayo; William C. Llaneza; Floridel M. Paz; Felicisimo B. Borillo
  - Electorate: 2,750 voters (2025)

Area
  - Total: 116.29 km^{2} (44.90 sq mi)
- Elevation: 103 m (338 ft)
- Highest elevation: 584 m (1,916 ft)
- Lowest elevation: 11 m (36 ft)

Population (2024 census)
  - Total: 3,457
  - Density: 29.73/km^{2} (76.99/sq mi)
  - Households: 802

Economy
  - Income class: 4th municipal income class
  - Poverty incidence: 18.43% (2023)
  - Revenue: ₱ 95.21 million (2021)
  - Assets: ₱ 254.2 million (2021)
  - Expenditure: ₱ 63.5 million (2021)
  - Liabilities: ₱ 40.78 million (2021)

Service provider
  - Electricity: Abra Electric Cooperative (ABRECO)
- Time zone: UTC+8 (PST)
- ZIP code: 2807
- PSGC: 1400112000
- IDD : area code: +63 (0)74
- Native languages: Itneg, Ilocano, Filipino

Langiden, officially the Municipality of Langiden (Ilocano: Ili ti Langiden; Filipino: Bayan ng Langiden), is a municipality in the province of Abra, Philippines. According to the 2024 census, it has a population of 3,457 people.

== Geography ==
According to the Philippine Statistics Authority, the municipality has a land area of 116.29 square kilometres (44.90 sq mi) constituting 2.79% of the 4,165.25-square-kilometre- (1,608.21 sq mi) total area of Abra. It is located at 17°35′N 120°34′E.

Langiden is situated 18.75 kilometres (11.65 mi) from the provincial capital Bangued, and 424.60 kilometres (263.83 mi) from the country's capital city of Manila.

=== Barangays ===
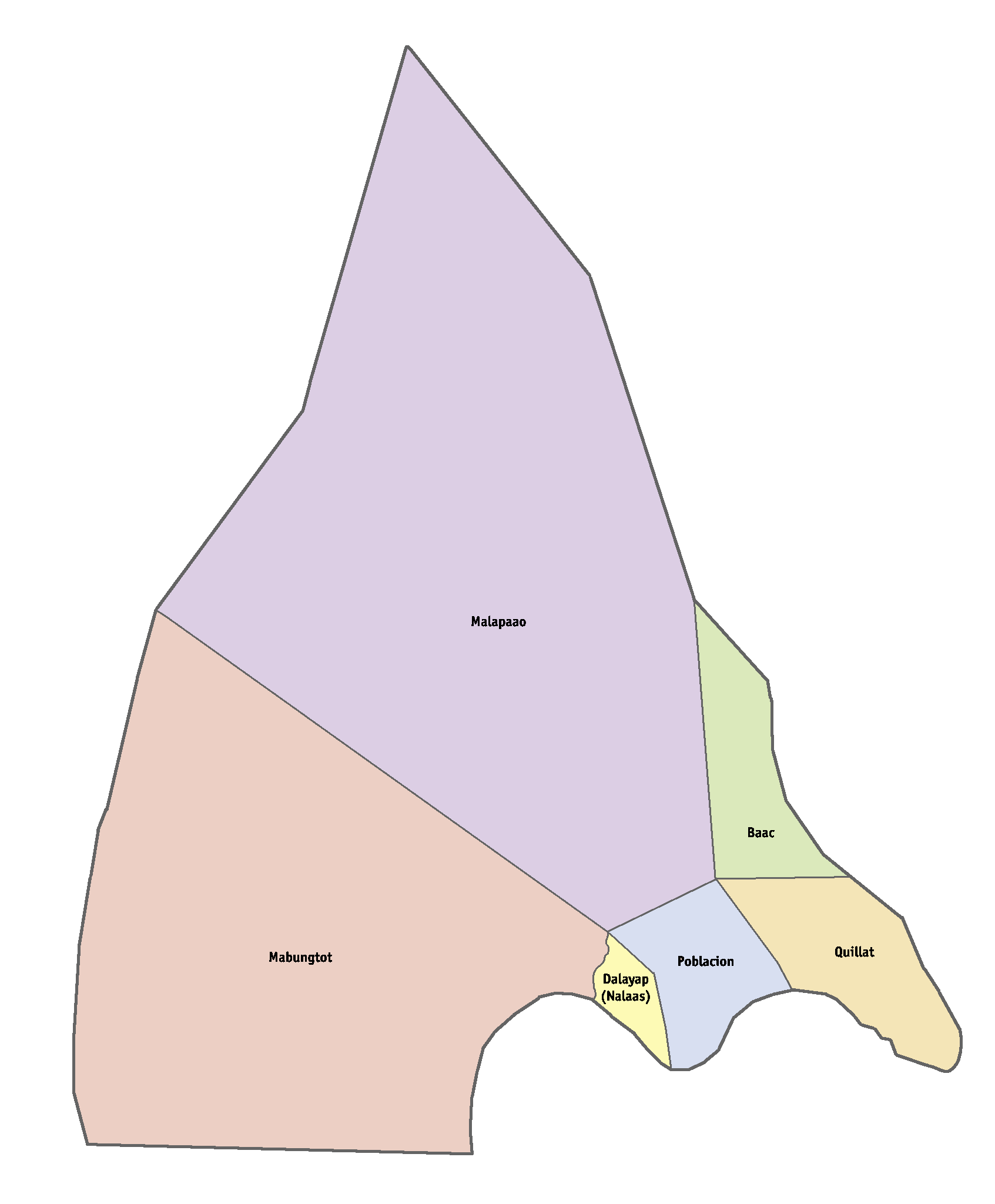
Political map of Langiden

Langiden is politically subdivided into 6 barangays. Each barangay consists of puroks and some have sitios.

PSGC	Barangay	Population			±% p.a.	
		2024		2010		
140112001	Baac	10.6%	368	360	▴	0.15%
140112004	Dalayap (Nalaas)	15.3%	529	470	▴	0.82%
140112005	Mabungtot	16.0%	553	500	▴	0.70%
140112006	Malapaao	24.1%	834	707	▴	1.15%
140112007	Poblacion	11.9%	412	379	▴	0.58%
140112008	Quillat	25.5%	880	754	▴	1.08%
	Total		3,457	3,576	▾	−0.23%

=== Climate ===
Climate data for Langiden, Abra
Month	Jan	Feb	Mar	Apr	May	Jun	Jul	Aug	Sep	Oct	Nov	Dec	Year
Mean daily maximum °C (°F)	29 (84)	31 (88)	32 (90)	34 (93)	32 (90)	31 (88)	31 (88)	30 (86)	30 (86)	30 (86)	30 (86)	29 (84)	31 (87)
Mean daily minimum °C (°F)	18 (64)	19 (66)	20 (68)	23 (73)	24 (75)	24 (75)	24 (75)	24 (75)	23 (73)	22 (72)	21 (70)	19 (66)	22 (71)
Average precipitation mm (inches)	9 (0.4)	11 (0.4)	13 (0.5)	23 (0.9)	92 (3.6)	122 (4.8)	153 (6.0)	137 (5.4)	139 (5.5)	141 (5.6)	42 (1.7)	14 (0.6)	896 (35.4)
Average rainy days	4.6	4.0	6.2	9.1	19.5	23.2	24.0	22.5	21.5	15.2	10.5	6.0	166.3
Source: Meteoblue

== Demographics ==
Population census of Langiden
Year	Pop.	±% p.a.
1918	1,598	—
1939	1,634	+0.11%
1948	1,297	−2.53%
1960	1,743	+2.49%
1970	2,558	+3.91%
1975	2,194	−3.03%
1980	2,256	+0.56%
1990	2,452	+0.84%
1995	2,729	+2.03%
2000	2,998	+2.04%
2007	3,242	+1.09%
2010	3,170	−0.81%
2015	3,198	+0.17%
2020	3,576	+2.38%
2024	3,457	−0.81%
Source: Philippine Statistics Authority

In the 2024 census, Langiden had a population of 3,457 people. The population density was 30 inhabitants per square kilometre (78/sq mi).

== Economy ==
Poverty incidence of Langiden (%)

Source: Philippine Statistics Authority

The municipality is heavily relied on agriculture. Langiden's agricultural production centers on rice and vegetable farming while farming and local trading serve as the primary sources of household income.

== Government ==
=== Local government ===
Langiden, belonging to the lone congressional district of the province of Abra, is governed by a mayor designated as its local chief executive and by a municipal council as its legislative body in accordance with the Local Government Code. The mayor, vice mayor, and the councilors are elected directly by the people through an election which is being held every three years.

=== Elected officials ===
Members of the Municipal Council (2025–2028)
Position	Name
Congressman	Joseph Santo Niño B. Bernos
Mayor	Secel B. Palecpec
Vice-Mayor	Mary A. Bueno
Councilors	Johnzel B. Palecpec
Councilors	Floridel M. Paz
Councilors	Debbie D. Papagayo
Councilors	William C. Llaneza
Councilors	Charles R. Estimo
Councilors	Jovito A. Bisares
Councilors	Ruben G. Castillo
Councilors	Felicisimo B. Borillo

== Education ==
The Langiden Schools District Office governs all educational institutions within the municipality. It oversees the management and operations of all private and public, from primary to secondary schools.

=== Primary and elementary schools ===
- Baac Elementary School
- Langiden Central School
- Mabungtot Elementary School
- Malapaao Elementary School
- Quillat Elementary School

=== Secondary school ===
- Langiden National High School
