= San Isidro, Abra =

Municipality in Abra, Philippines

San Isidro
- Municipality
- Municipality of San Isidro
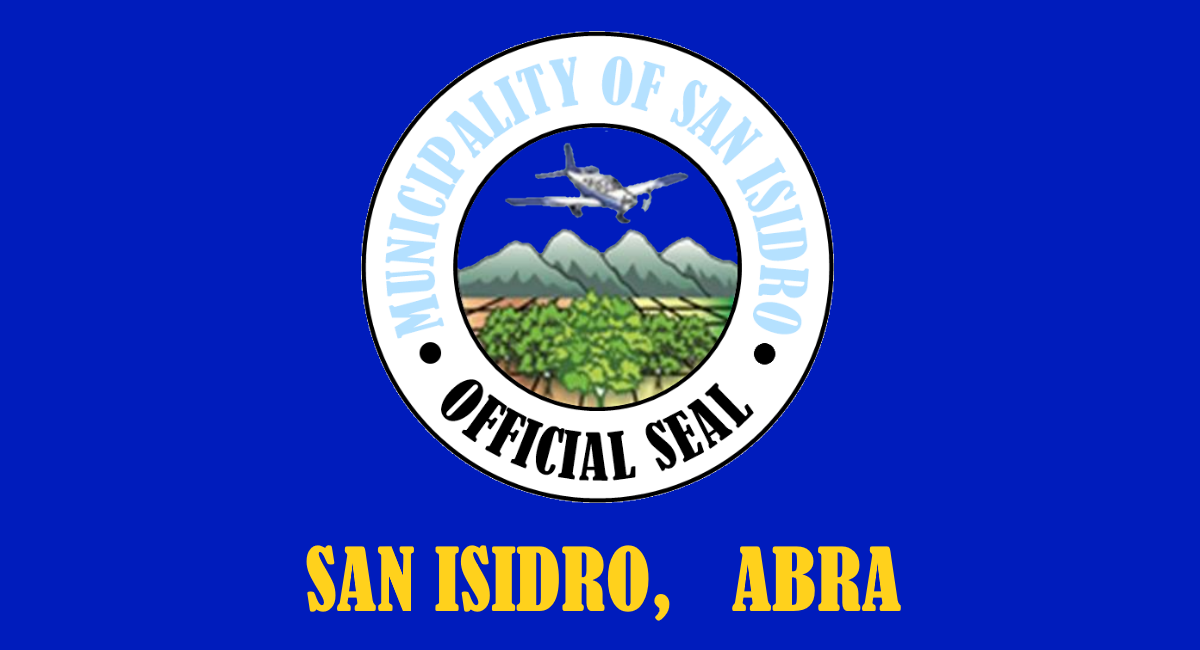
- Flag

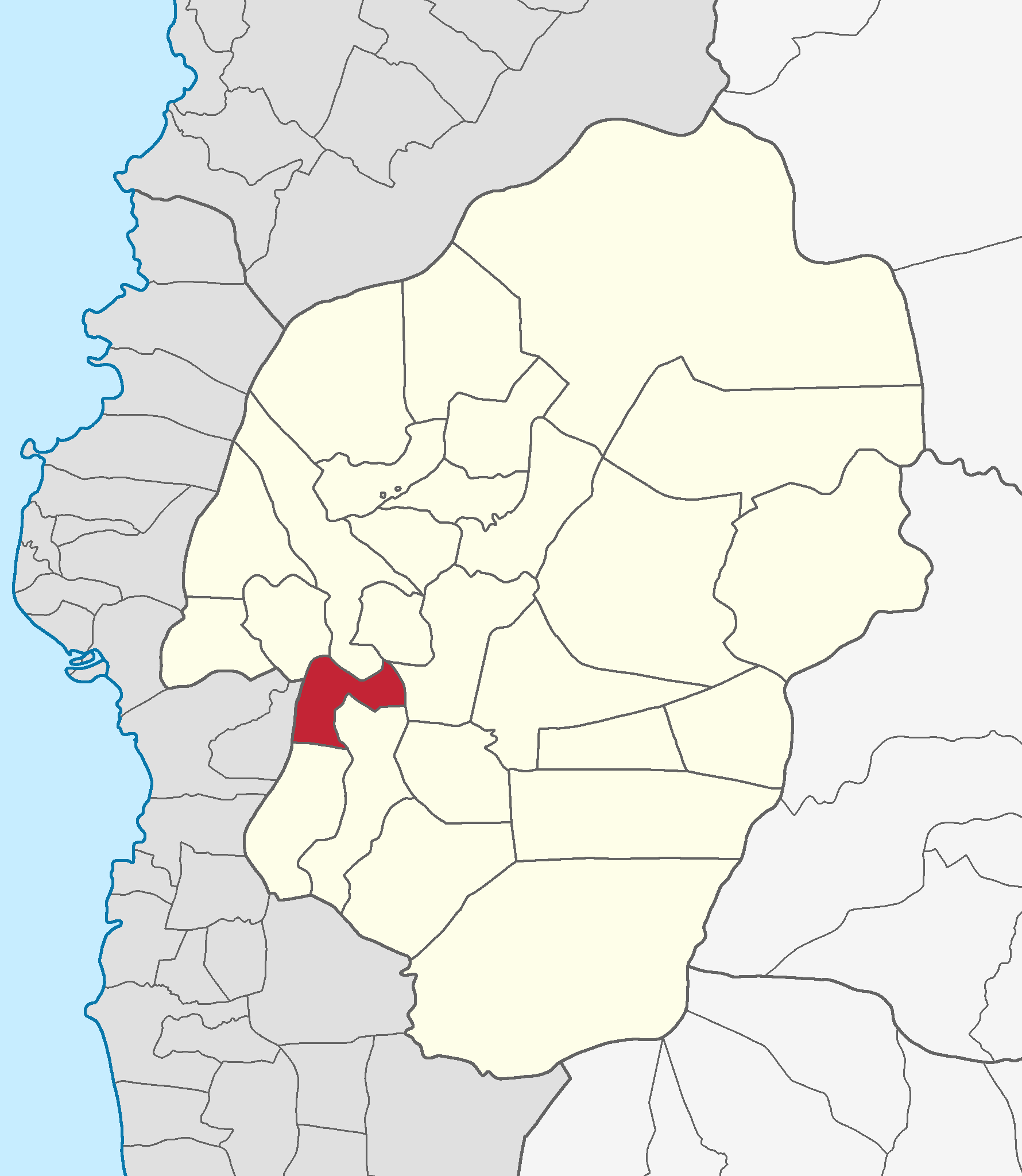
- Map of Abra with San Isidro highlighted
- Interactive map of San Isidro
- Location within the Philippines
- Coordinates: 17°28′N 120°36′E
- Country: Philippines
- Region: Cordillera Administrative Region
- Province: Abra
- District: Lone district
- Barangays: 9 (see Barangays)

Government
  - Type: Sangguniang Bayan
  - Mayor: Marilyn F. Pacsa
  - Vice Mayor: Elmerante M. Pacsa
  - Representative: Joseph Santo Niño B. Bernos
  - Municipal Council: Members: Antonio P. Bocarile; Janet M. Balanay; Rhomel M. Agudal; Eligeor G. Pacsa; Darwin B. Montero; Noe A. Cabbab; Filomerto C. Cabunoc; Rey C. Bacarisa
  - Electorate: 3,461 voters (2025)

Area
  - Total: 48.07 km^{2} (18.56 sq mi)
- Elevation: 220 m (720 ft)
- Highest elevation: 521 m (1,709 ft)
- Lowest elevation: 32 m (105 ft)

Population (2024 census)
  - Total: 4,771
  - Density: 99.25/km^{2} (257.1/sq mi)
  - Households: 1,193

Economy
  - Income class: 2nd municipal income class
  - Poverty incidence: 8.91% (2023)
  - Revenue: ₱ 38.93 million (2012), 42.04 million (2013), 30.33 million (2014), 83.38 million (2015), 158.5 million (2016), 247.8 million (2017), 260.9 million (2018), 144.4 million (2019), 24.92 million (2011)
  - Assets: ₱ 22.08 million (2012), 23.24 million (2013), 24.11 million (2014), 335.7 million (2015), 112.4 million (2016), 318.6 million (2017), 358.6 million (2018), 379.5 million (2019), 24.07 million (2011)
  - Expenditure: ₱ 38.34 million (2012), 40.86 million (2013), 29.47 million (2014), 22.25 million (2015), 111.5 million (2016), 39.11 million (2017), 29.7 million (2018), 43.1 million (2019), 24.41 million (2011)
  - Liabilities: ₱ 12.06 million (2012), 11.82 million (2013), 11.81 million (2014), 26.9 million (2015), 45.11 million (2016), 42.36 million (2017), 56.64 million (2018), 52.82 million (2019), 13.56 million (2011)

Service provider
  - Electricity: Abra Electric Cooperative (ABRECO)
- Time zone: UTC+8 (PST)
- ZIP code: 2809
- PSGC: 1400121000
- IDD : area code: +63 (0)74
- Native languages: Itneg; Ilocano; Tagalog

San Isidro, officially the Municipality of San Isidro (Ilocano: Ili ti San Isidro; Tagalog: Bayan ng San Isidro), is a municipality in the province of Abra, Philippines. According to the 2024 census, it has a population of 4,771 people.

== Geography ==
The Municipality of San Isidro is located at 17°28′N 120°36′E. According to the Philippine Statistics Authority, the municipality has a land area of 48.07 square kilometres (18.56 sq mi) constituting 1.15% of the 4,165.25-square-kilometre- (1,608.21 sq mi) total area of Abra.

San Isidro is situated 18.77 kilometres (11.66 mi) from the provincial capital Bangued, and 411.57 kilometres (255.74 mi) from the country's capital city of Manila.

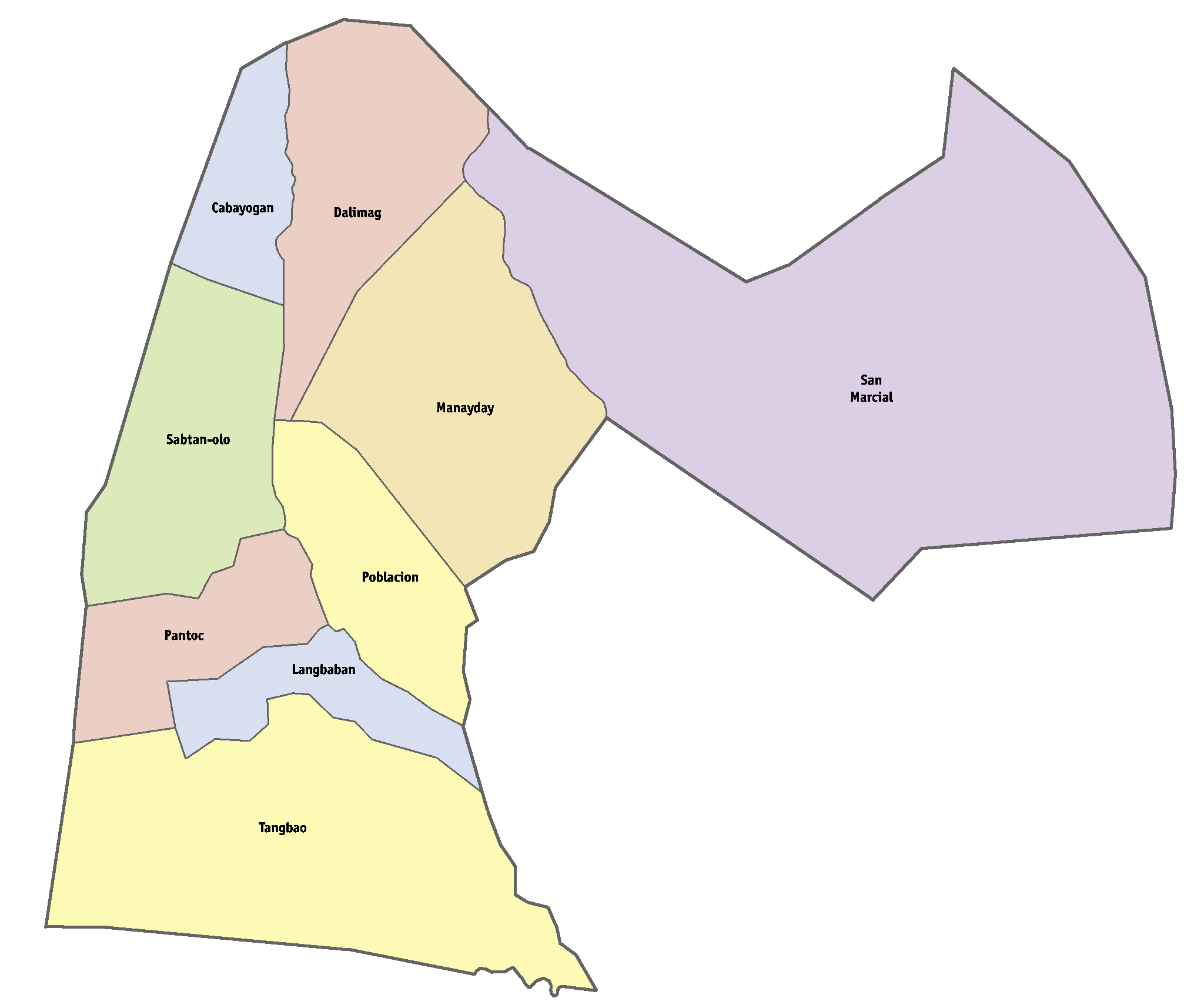
Political map of San Isidro

=== Barangays ===
San Isidro is politically subdivided into 9 barangays. Each barangay consists of puroks and some have sitios.

PSGC	Barangay	Population			±% p.a.	
		2024		2010		
140121001	Cabayogan	7.2%	342	301	▴	0.89%
140121002	Dalimag	14.3%	683	767	▾	−0.80%
140121003	Langbaban	8.3%	398	342	▴	1.06%
140121004	Manayday	12.4%	592	601	▾	−0.10%
140121007	Pantoc	9.9%	471	422	▴	0.76%
140121008	Poblacion	12.7%	606	645	▾	−0.43%
140121010	Sabtan-olo	7.7%	369	330	▴	0.78%
140121012	San Marcial	13.1%	623	769	▾	−1.45%
140121013	Tangbao	13.9%	661	711	▾	−0.50%
	Total		4,771	4,745	▴	0.04%

=== Climate ===
Climate data for San Isidro, Abra
Month	Jan	Feb	Mar	Apr	May	Jun	Jul	Aug	Sep	Oct	Nov	Dec	Year
Mean daily maximum °C (°F)	29 (84)	30 (86)	32 (90)	33 (91)	32 (90)	31 (88)	30 (86)	29 (84)	29 (84)	30 (86)	30 (86)	29 (84)	30 (87)
Mean daily minimum °C (°F)	18 (64)	19 (66)	20 (68)	23 (73)	24 (75)	24 (75)	24 (75)	24 (75)	23 (73)	22 (72)	20 (68)	19 (66)	22 (71)
Average precipitation mm (inches)	10 (0.4)	10 (0.4)	14 (0.6)	23 (0.9)	80 (3.1)	103 (4.1)	121 (4.8)	111 (4.4)	119 (4.7)	114 (4.5)	39 (1.5)	15 (0.6)	759 (30)
Average rainy days	5.2	3.9	6.2	9.1	18.5	21.4	22.9	19.8	19.8	16.2	10.5	6.1	159.6
Source: Meteoblue

== Demographics ==
Population census of San Isidro
Year	Pop.	±% p.a.
1960	2,605	—
1970	3,098	+1.75%
1975	2,924	−1.15%
1980	3,087	+1.09%
1990	3,744	+1.95%
1995	3,842	+0.49%
2000	4,293	+2.41%
2007	4,647	+1.10%
2010	4,888	+1.86%
2015	4,574	−1.26%
2020	4,745	+0.78%
2024	4,771	+0.13%
Source: Philippine Statistics Authority

In the 2024 census, San Isidro had a population of 4,771 people. The population density was 99 inhabitants per square kilometre (260/sq mi).

== Economy ==
Poverty incidence of San Isidro (%)

Source: Philippine Statistics Authority

The main source of economy in San Isidro is agriculture. The municipality focuses on the cultivation of clustered oyster mushroom. San Isidro also produces processed products to serve as a potential One Town, One Product (OTOP) enterprise.

== Government ==
=== Local government ===
San Isidro, belonging to the lone congressional district of the province of Abra, is governed by a mayor designated as its local chief executive and by a municipal council as its legislative body in accordance with the Local Government Code. The mayor, vice mayor, and the councilors are elected directly by the people through an election which is being held every three years.

=== Elected officials ===
Members of the Municipal Council (2025–2028)
Position	Name
Congressman	Joseph Santo Niño B. Bernos
Mayor	Marilyn F. Pacsa
Vice-Mayor	Elmerante M. Pacsa
Councilors	Eligeor G. Pacsa
Councilors	Janet M. Balanay
Councilors	Darwin B. Montero
Councilors	Rey C. Bacarisa
Councilors	Antonio P. Bocarile
Councilors	Rhomel M. Agudal
Councilors	Noe A. Cabbab
Councilors	Filomerto C. Cabunoc

== Education ==
The San Isidro Schools District Office governs all educational institutions within the municipality. It oversees the management and operations of all private and public, from primary to secondary schools.

=== Primary and elementary schools ===
- Dalimag Elementary School
- Manayday Elementary School
- Maoay Primary School
- Olo Elementary School
- San Isidro Central School
- San Marcial Elementary School
- Turod Elementary School

=== Secondary school ===
- San Isidro National High School
