= Licuan-Baay =

Municipality in Abra, Philippines

- Municipality
- Municipality of Licuan-Baay
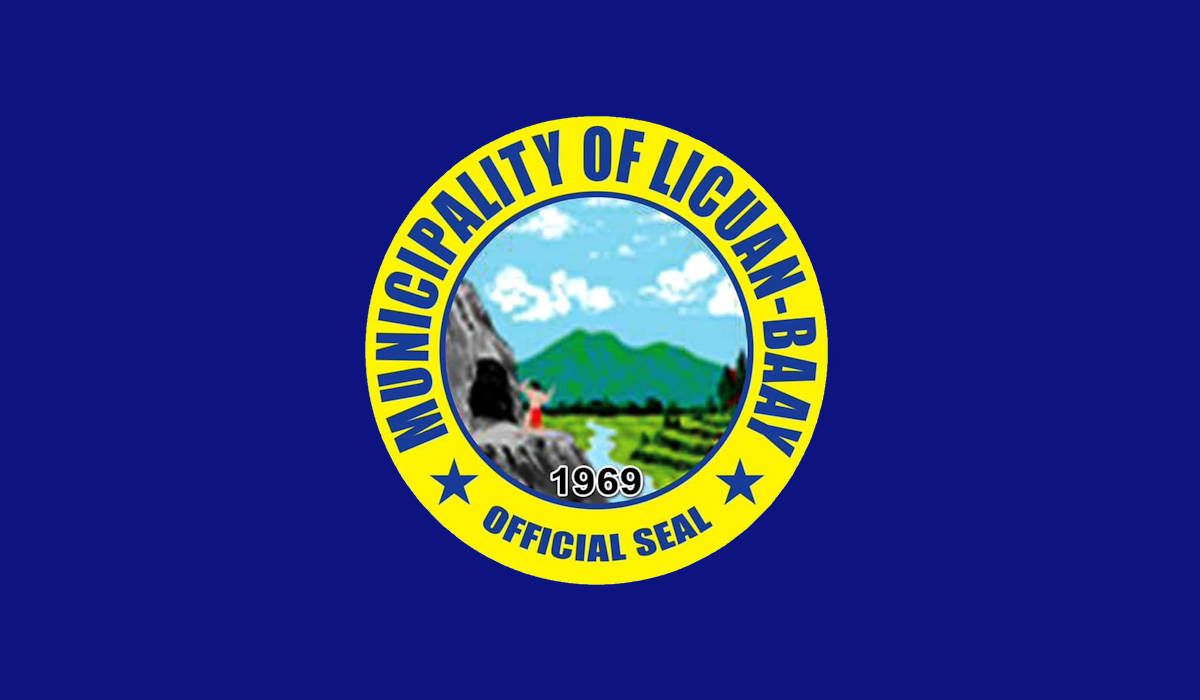
- Flag

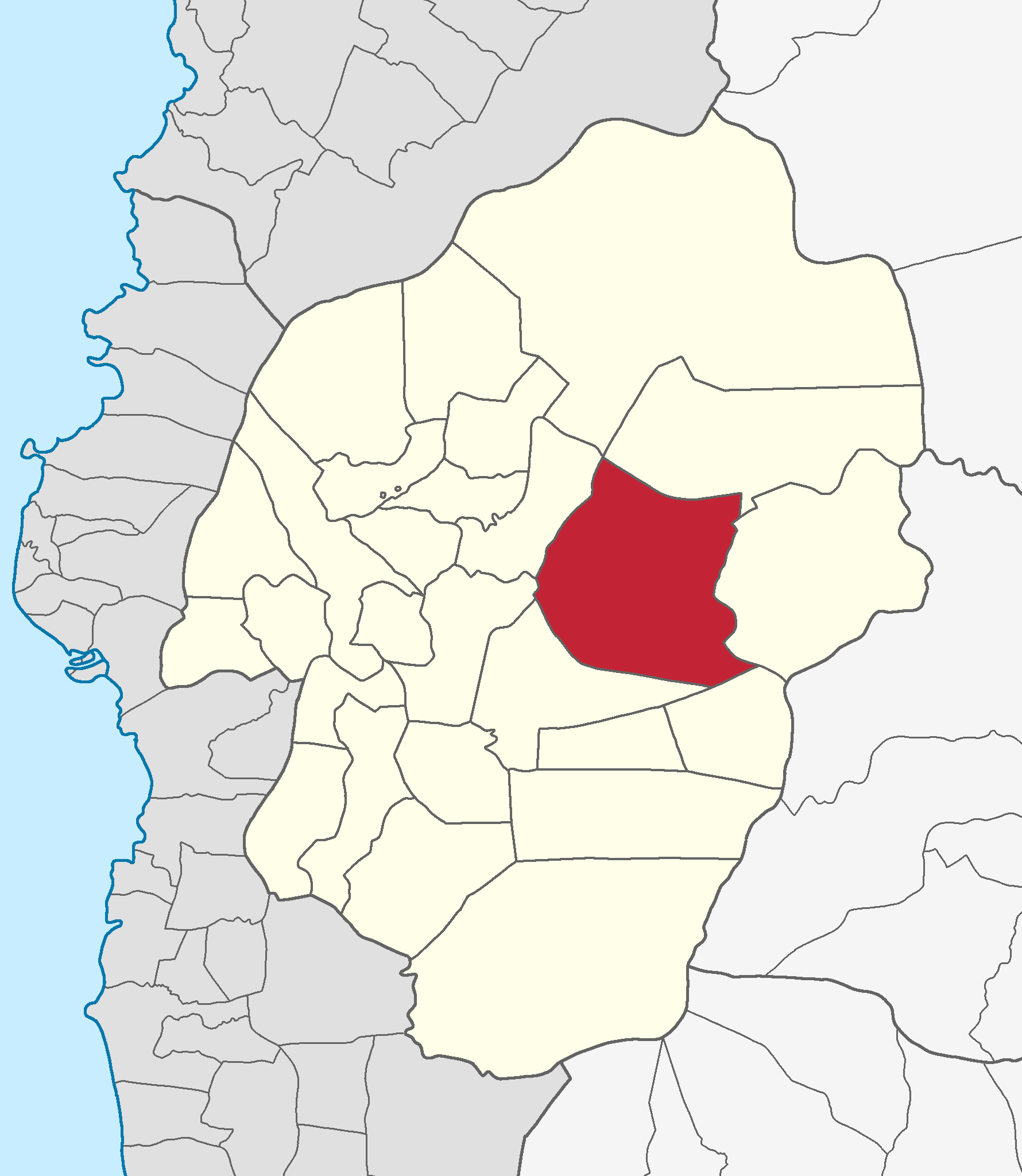
- Map of Abra with Licuan-Baay highlighted
- Interactive map of Licuan-Baay
- Location within the Philippines
- Coordinates: 17°36′33″N 120°54′19″E
- Country: Philippines
- Region: Cordillera Administrative Region
- Province: Abra
- District: Lone district
- Founded: 1652
- Barangays: 11 (see Barangays)

Government
  - Type: Sangguniang Bayan
  - Mayor: Darwin L. Domingo
  - Vice Mayor: Alejo S. Domingo
  - Representative: Joseph Santo Niño B. Bernos
  - Municipal Council: Members: Zaldy S. Daguio; Aguinaldo V. Purugganan; Antonio S. Valera; Loida T. Balbin; Ramon C. Bumogas; Herminia G. Balanay; Josephine V. Cariño; Deljun W. Blando
  - Electorate: 4,420 voters (2025)

Area
  - Total: 256.42 km^{2} (99.00 sq mi)
- Elevation: 626 m (2,054 ft)
- Highest elevation: 1,493 m (4,898 ft)
- Lowest elevation: 231 m (758 ft)

Population (2024 census)
  - Total: 4,301
  - Density: 16.77/km^{2} (43.44/sq mi)
  - Households: 993

Economy
  - Income class: 3rd municipal income class
  - Poverty incidence: 11.69% (2023)
  - Revenue: ₱ 52.94 million (2012), 65.66 million (2013), 53.58 million (2014), 62.42 million (2015), 71.26 million (2016), 70.75 million (2017), 102.7 million (2018), 46.17 million (2011)
  - Assets: ₱ 23.15 million (2012), 55.55 million (2013), 52.86 million (2014), 62.96 million (2015), 119.7 million (2016), 137.5 million (2017), 248 million (2018), 16.28 million (2011)
  - Expenditure: ₱ 12.3 million (2012), 33.95 million (2013), 33.09 million (2014), 44.11 million (2015), 47.12 million (2016), 51.68 million (2017), 63.35 million (2018), 18.03 million (2011)
  - Liabilities: ₱ 10.43 million (2012), 28.43 million (2013), 21.63 million (2014), 35.93 million (2015), 45.01 million (2016), 47.1 million (2017), 103.2 million (2018), 5.89 million (2011)

Service provider
  - Electricity: Abra Electric Cooperative (ABRECO)
- Time zone: UTC+8 (PST)
- ZIP code: 2819
- PSGC: 1400113000
- IDD : area code: +63 (0)74
- Native languages: Itneg, Ilocano, Filipino

Licuan-Baay, officially the Municipality of Licuan-Baay (Ilocano: Ili ti Licuan-Baay; Filipino: Bayan ng Licuan-Baay), is a municipality in the province of Abra, Philippines. According to the 2024 census, it has a population of 4,301 people.

== History ==
=== Spanish era ===
Before Licuan-Baay was merged, there was only Licuan and Baay. Baay was founded at a time when Candon was the capital of Ilocos Sur and Abra, and was the mother town of Licuan. Meanwhile, the town of Licuan was founded by the Spaniards in 1652. They set up their headquarters at the village of Baquiro.

=== Philippine-American War ===
During the Philippine-American War, there was one incident at Sitio Diangay in which a 100 strong American army unit chased a 20 Filipino guerrilla group. One American soldier was wounded while 15 Filipino soldiers were killed. The rest surrendered.

=== World War II ===
During World War II, after the defeat at Bataan, American and Filipino forces began hiding at Mount Bawao from the Japanese occupational authorities. The Japanese eventually found their hideout and turned them into "cargadores" at bayonet point. In 1944, the Japanese set up a garrison in Licuan, staying in the town for 3 months.

== Geography ==
According to the Philippine Statistics Authority, the municipality has a land area of 256.42 square kilometres (99.00 sq mi) constituting 6.16% of the 4,165.25-square-kilometre- (1,608.21 sq mi) total area of Abra. It is located at 17°36′33″N 120°54′19″E.

Licuan-Baay is situated 51.97 kilometres (32.29 mi) from the provincial capital Bangued, and 457.81 kilometres (284.47 mi) from the country's capital city of Manila.

=== Barangays ===
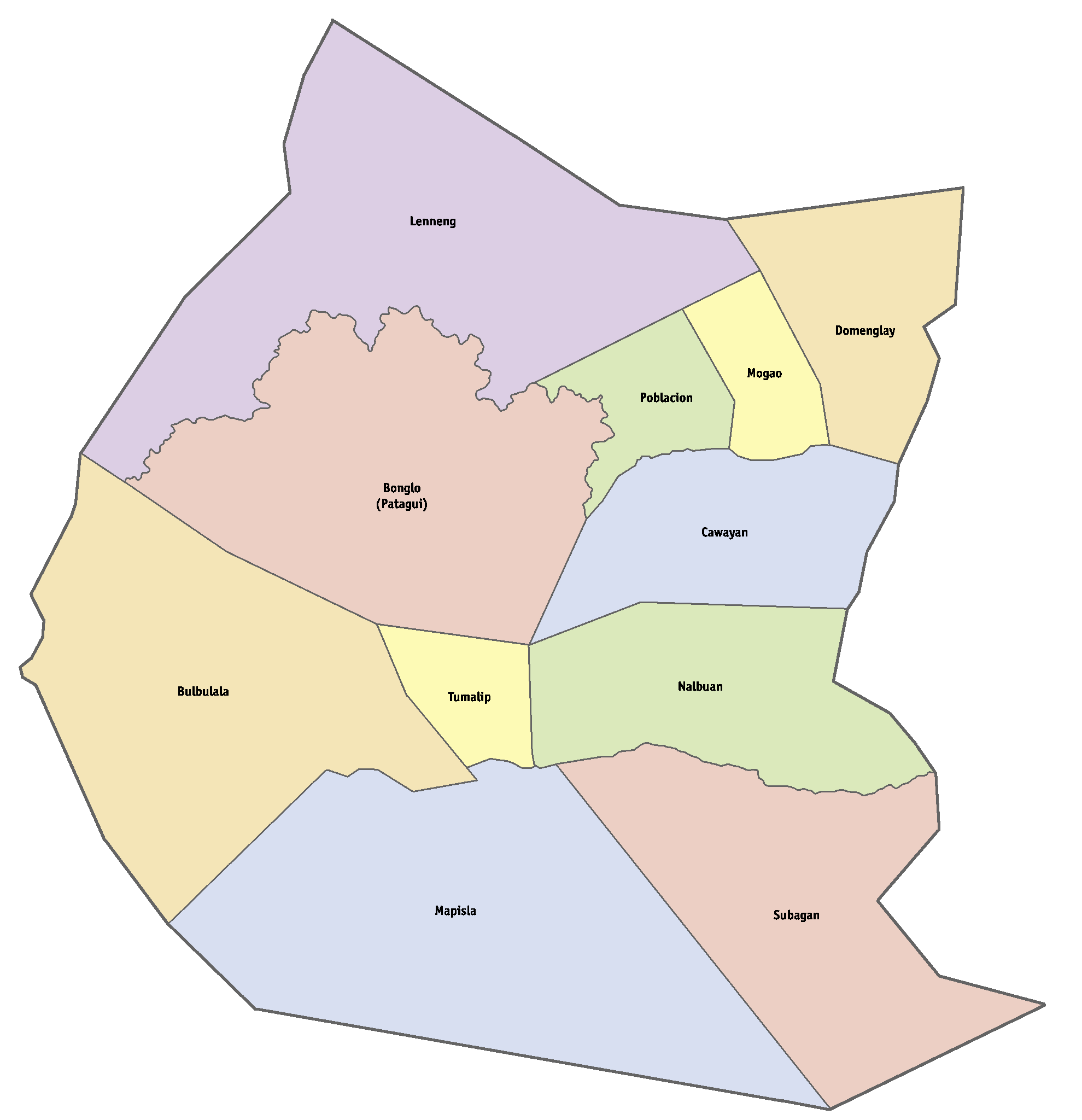
Political map of Licuan-Baay

Licuan-Baay is politically subdivided into 11 barangays. Each barangay consists of puroks and some have sitios.

PSGC	Barangay	Population			±% p.a.	
		2024		2010		
140113001	Bonglo (Patagui)	6.1%	261	261	Steady	0.00%
140113002	Bulbulala	9.0%	389	363	▴	0.48%
140113003	Cawayan	9.9%	426	483	▾	−0.87%
140113004	Domenglay	10.5%	450	417	▴	0.53%
140113005	Lenneng	7.7%	332	359	▾	−0.54%
140113006	Mapisla	9.6%	415	518	▾	−1.52%
140113007	Mogao	6.2%	265	349	▾	−1.89%
140113008	Nalbuan	18.2%	783	852	▾	−0.58%
140113009	Poblacion	6.4%	276	379	▾	−2.17%
140113010	Subagan	14.3%	615	525	▴	1.10%
140113011	Tumalip	8.2%	354	358	▾	−0.08%
	Total		4,301	4,566	▾	−0.41%

=== Climate ===
Climate data for Licuan-Baay, Abra
Month	Jan	Feb	Mar	Apr	May	Jun	Jul	Aug	Sep	Oct	Nov	Dec	Year
Mean daily maximum °C (°F)	27 (81)	26 (79)	28 (82)	30 (86)	29 (84)	29 (84)	28 (82)	28 (82)	28 (82)	27 (81)	27 (81)	25 (77)	28 (82)
Mean daily minimum °C (°F)	17 (63)	18 (64)	19 (66)	21 (70)	22 (72)	23 (73)	22 (72)	23 (73)	22 (72)	20 (68)	20 (68)	18 (64)	20 (69)
Average precipitation mm (inches)	24 (0.9)	26 (1.0)	25 (1.0)	43 (1.7)	159 (6.3)	180 (7.1)	204 (8.0)	207 (8.1)	183 (7.2)	185 (7.3)	91 (3.6)	67 (2.6)	1,394 (54.8)
Average rainy days	8.2	8.7	10.1	13.7	22.3	24.3	25.3	23.5	22.2	16.4	14.1	12.7	201.5
Source: Meteoblue

== Demographics ==
Population census of Licuan-Baay
Year	Pop.	±% p.a.
1939	1,379	—
1948	1,477	+0.77%
1960	2,066	+2.84%
1970	2,821	+3.16%
1975	3,144	+2.20%
1980	3,094	−0.32%
1990	3,697	+1.80%
1995	3,866	+0.84%
2000	3,812	−0.30%
2007	3,990	+0.63%
2010	4,864	+7.47%
2015	4,689	−0.70%
2020	4,566	−0.56%
2024	4,301	−1.43%
Source: Philippine Statistics Authority

In the 2024 census, Licuan-Baay had a population of 4,301 people. The population density was 17 inhabitants per square kilometre (44/sq mi).

== Economy ==
Poverty incidence of Licuan-Baay (%)

Source: Philippine Statistics Authority

The municipality relies on agriculture, livestock, and mining. The agriculture of Licuan-Baay produces rice, corn, coffee, cacao, mangoes, and achuete. The farmers of Licuan-Baay raises cattle, swine, goats, and poultry. Local mountains contain deposits of gold and silver.

== Government ==
=== Local government ===
Licuan-Baay, belonging to the lone congressional district of the province of Abra, is governed by a mayor designated as its local chief executive and by a municipal council as its legislative body in accordance with the Local Government Code. The mayor, vice mayor, and the councilors are elected directly by the people through an election which is being held every three years.

=== Elected officials ===
Members of the Municipal Council (2025–2028)
Position	Name
Congressman	Joseph Santo Niño B. Bernos
Mayor	Darwin L. Domingo
Vice-Mayor	Alejo S. Domingo
Councilors	Zaldy S. Daguio
Councilors	Loida T. Balbin
Councilors	Antonio S. Valera
Councilors	Deljun W. Blando
Councilors	Ramon C. Bumogas
Councilors	Aguinaldo V. Purugganan
Councilors	Herminia G. Balanay
Councilors	Josephine V. Cariño

== Education ==
The Licuan-Baay Schools District Office governs all educational institutions within the municipality. It oversees the management and operations of all private and public, from primary to secondary schools.

=== Primary and elementary schools ===
- Agat Primary School
- Baquero Elementary School
- Bonglo Elementary School
- Bulbulala Primary School
- Caoayan Primary School
- Diangay Primary School
- Kileng Primary School
- Lenneng Elementary School
- Licuan-Baay Central School
- Nalbuan Elementary School
- Subagan Primary School
- Sucao Elementary School

=== Secondary schools ===
- Baay National High School
- Licuan Integrated School
