= Lacub =

Municipality in Abra, Philippines

- Municipality
- Municipality of Lacub
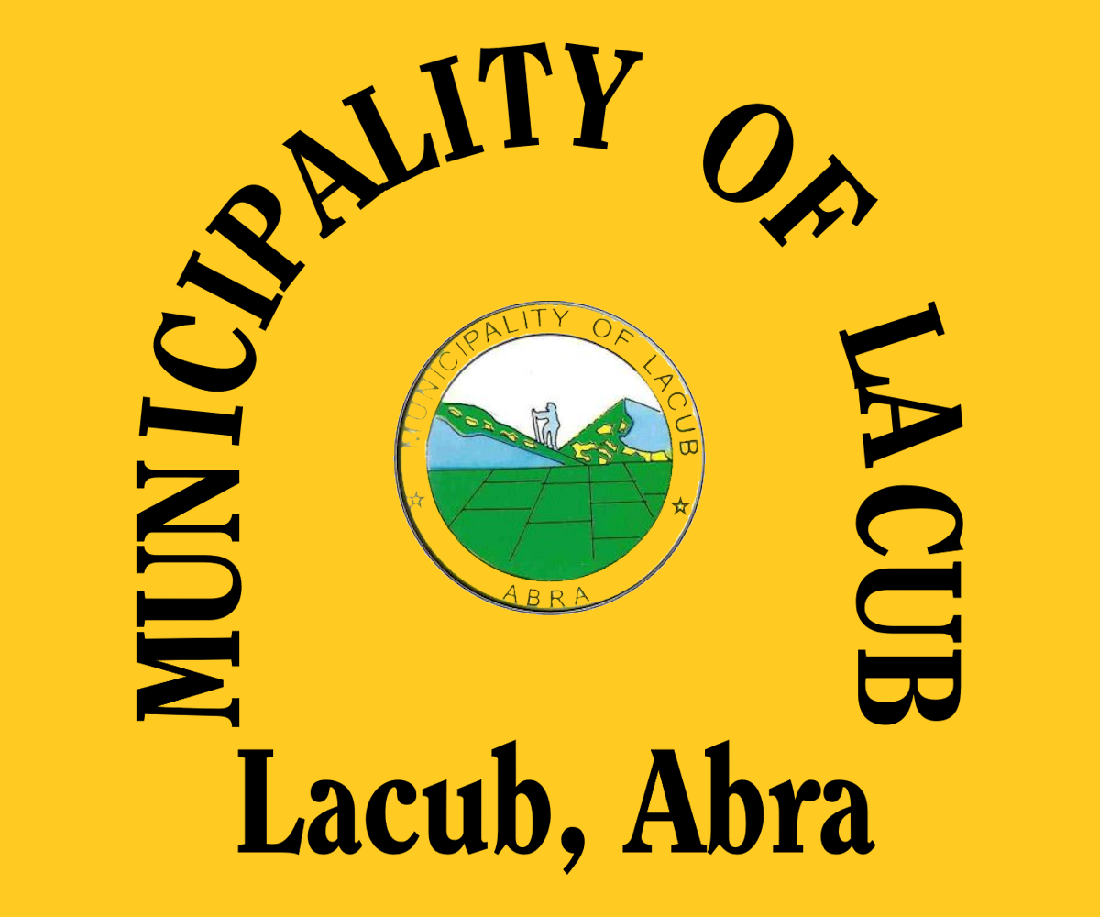
- Flag Seal

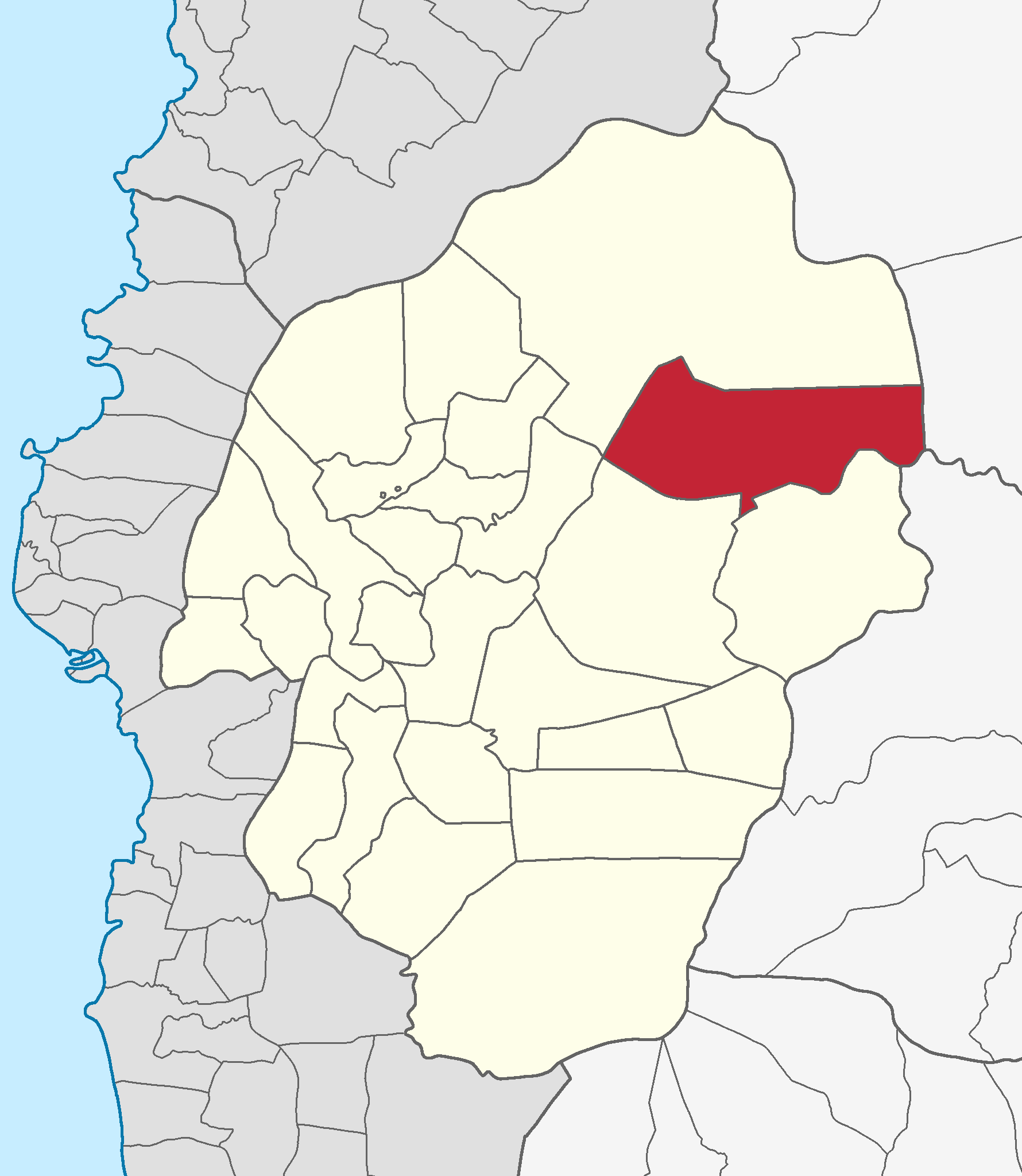
- Map of Abra with Lacub highlighted
- Interactive map of Lacub
- Location within the Philippines
- Coordinates: 17°40′N 120°57′E
- Country: Philippines
- Region: Cordillera Administrative Region
- Province: Abra
- District: Lone district
- Barangays: 6 (see Barangays)

Government
  - Type: Sangguniang Bayan
  - Mayor: Estelita B. Bersamina
  - Vice Mayor: Nestor B. Bersamina
  - Representative: Joseph Santo Niño B. Bernos
  - Municipal Council: Members: Mario B. Eduarte Jr.; Benito L. Eguem Jr.; Edgardo M. Bulaay; Alejandro A. Feraren; Reynaldo D. Bernal Jr.; Danny A. Lingbaoan; Leonardo S. Eguem Jr.; Narciso B. Sagmayao
  - Electorate: 3,819 voters (2025)

Area
  - Total: 295.30 km^{2} (114.02 sq mi)
- Elevation: 723 m (2,372 ft)
- Highest elevation: 1,577 m (5,174 ft)
- Lowest elevation: 384 m (1,260 ft)

Population (2024 census)
  - Total: 3,649
  - Density: 12.36/km^{2} (32.00/sq mi)
  - Households: 676

Economy
  - Income class: 2nd municipal income class
  - Poverty incidence: 16.85% (2023)
  - Revenue: ₱ 48.73 million (2012), 51.08 million (2013), 82.69 million (2014), 75.58 million (2015), 73.29 million (2016), 74.47 million (2017), 105.7 million (2018), 102.8 million (2019), 49.01 million (2011)
  - Assets: ₱ 35.19 million (2012), 44.72 million (2013), 40.77 million (2014), 47.47 million (2015), 75.54 million (2016), 84.98 million (2017), 173.7 million (2018), 208.8 million (2019), 32.17 million (2011)
  - Expenditure: ₱ 45.21 million (2012), 48.89 million (2013), 46.9 million (2014), 55.8 million (2015), 64.75 million (2016), 74.16 million (2017), 77.16 million (2018), 89.77 million (2019), 45.14 million (2011)
  - Liabilities: ₱ 6.427 million (2012), 15.2 million (2013), 9.441 million (2014), 2.005 million (2015), 1.578 million (2016), 24.45 million (2017), 75.42 million (2018), 44.83 million (2019), 9.111 million (2011)

Service provider
  - Electricity: Abra Electric Cooperative (ABRECO)
- Time zone: UTC+8 (PST)
- ZIP code: 2821
- PSGC: 1400109000
- IDD : area code: +63 (0)74
- Native languages: Itneg, Ilocano, Filipino

Lacub, officially the Municipality of Lacub (Ilocano: Ili ti Lacub; Filipino: Bayan ng Lacub), is a municipality in the province of Abra, Philippines. According to the 2024 census, it has a population of 3,649 people.

== Geography ==
According to the Philippine Statistics Authority, the municipality has a land area of 295.30 square kilometres (114.02 sq mi) constituting 7.09% of the 4,165.25-square-kilometre- (1,608.21 sq mi) total area of Abra. It is located at 17°40′N 120°57′E.

Lacub is situated 65.59 kilometres (40.76 mi) from the provincial capital Bangued, and 471.44 kilometres (292.94 mi) from the country's capital city of Manila.

=== Barangays ===
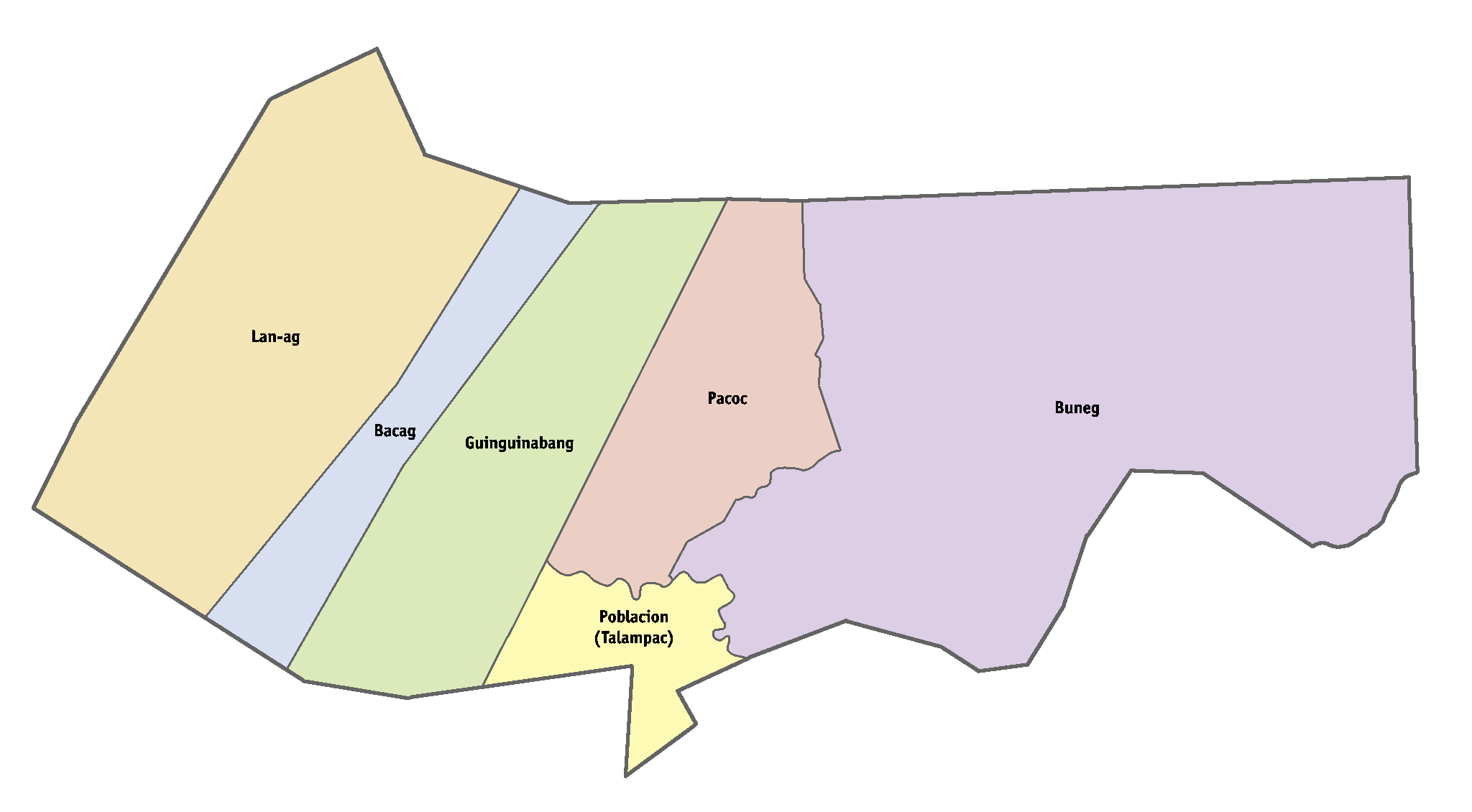
Political map of Lacub

Lacub is politically subdivided into 6 barangays. Each barangay consists of puroks and some have sitios.

PSGC	Barangay	Population			±% p.a.	
		2024		2010		
140109001	Bacag	7.6%	277	233	▴	1.21%
140109002	Buneg	23.7%	865	827	▴	0.31%
140109003	Guinguinabang	8.7%	316	290	▴	0.60%
140109004	Lan-ag	12.1%	440	353	▴	1.54%
140109005	Pacoc	19.2%	700	571	▴	1.42%
140109006	Poblacion (Talampac)	27.8%	1,014	703	▴	2.57%
	Total		3,649	3,612	▴	0.07%

=== Climate ===
Climate data for Lacub, Abra
Month	Jan	Feb	Mar	Apr	May	Jun	Jul	Aug	Sep	Oct	Nov	Dec	Year
Mean daily maximum °C (°F)	24 (75)	26 (79)	28 (82)	29 (84)	29 (84)	28 (82)	28 (82)	27 (81)	27 (81)	27 (81)	26 (79)	24 (75)	27 (80)
Mean daily minimum °C (°F)	16 (61)	17 (63)	18 (64)	20 (68)	22 (72)	22 (72)	22 (72)	22 (72)	21 (70)	20 (68)	18 (64)	18 (64)	20 (68)
Average precipitation mm (inches)	24 (0.9)	26 (1.0)	25 (1.0)	43 (1.7)	159 (6.3)	180 (7.1)	204 (8.0)	207 (8.1)	183 (7.2)	185 (7.3)	91 (3.6)	67 (2.6)	1,394 (54.8)
Average rainy days	8.2	8.7	10.1	13.7	22.3	24.3	25.3	23.5	22.2	16.4	14.1	12.7	201.5
Source: Meteoblue

== Demographics ==
Population census of Lacub
Year	Pop.	±% p.a.
1939	1,054	—
1948	944	−1.22%
1960	1,424	+3.48%
1970	1,706	+1.82%
1975	1,927	+2.47%
1980	2,038	+1.13%
1990	2,326	+1.33%
1995	2,202	−1.02%
2000	2,782	+5.14%
2007	3,050	+1.28%
2010	2,977	−0.88%
2015	3,403	+2.58%
2020	3,612	+1.26%
2024	3,649	+0.24%
Source: Philippine Statistics Authority

In the 2024 census, Lacub had a population of 3,649 people. The population density was 12 inhabitants per square kilometre (31/sq mi).

== Economy ==
Poverty incidence of Lacub (%)

Source: Philippine Statistics Authority

The municipality is known for agriculture, farming, local labor, and recent local development programs. In the agricultural aspect, Lacub is known for growing crops such as rice and corn. Lacub provides local mobile markets to produce food and supplies to the residents. In the infrastructure aspect, Lacub upgrades water systems, solar power in barangays, and school buildings. Lacub constructs access roads in the barangays to connect to the neighboring areas and municipalities in Abra.

== Government ==
=== Local government ===
Lacub, belonging to the lone congressional district of the province of Abra, is governed by a mayor designated as its local chief executive and by a municipal council as its legislative body in accordance with the Local Government Code. The mayor, vice mayor, and the councilors are elected directly by the people through an election which is being held every three years.

=== Elected officials ===
Members of the Municipal Council (2025–2028)
Position	Name
Congressman	Joseph Santo Niño B. Bernos
Mayor	Estelita B. Bersamina
Vice-Mayor	Nestor B. Bersamina
Councilors	Mario B. Eduarte, Jr.
Councilors	Benito L. Eguem, Jr.
Councilors	Danny A. Lingbaoan
Councilors	Reynaldo D. Bernal, Jr.
Councilors	Narciso B. Sagmayao
Councilors	Leonardo S. Eguem, Jr.
Councilors	Alejandro A. Feraren
Councilors	Edgardo M. Bulaay

== Education ==
The Lacub Schools District Office governs all educational institutions within the municipality. It oversees the management and operations of all private and public, from primary to secondary schools.

=== Primary and elementary schools ===
- Bacag Elementary School
- Buneg Primary School
- Lacub Central School
- Lan-ag Elementary School
- Pacoc Elementary School
- Sap-al Elementary School
- Talipugo Elementary School

=== Secondary school ===
- Alfredo D. Bersamina National High School
