= 2022 Philippine presidential election in Abra =

- May 9, 2022
- Registered: 182,696
- Turnout: 84.90%
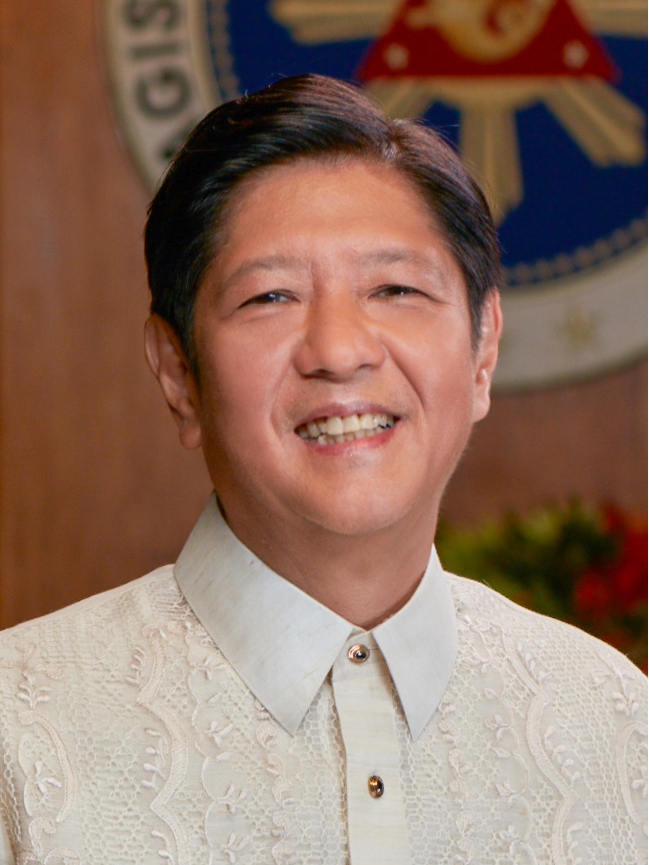

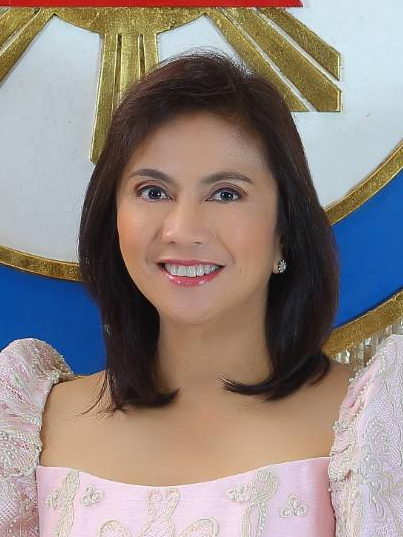
Candidate	Bongbong Marcos	Leni Robredo
Party	PFP	Independent
Alliance	UniTeam	TRoPa
Running mate	Sara Duterte	Kiko Pangilinan
Popular vote	147,812	4,502
Percentage	95.29%	2.90%
Home province/city	Ilocos Norte	Naga City

Marcos
60%–70%
70%–80%
80%–90%
>90%
President before election
Rodrigo Duterte
PDP-Laban
Elected President
Bongbong Marcos
PFP

The 2022 Philippine presidential and vice presidential election in Abra was held on Monday, May 9, 2022, as part of the 2022 Philippine general election in which all provinces, Highly Urbanized Cities, and Independent Component Cities participated. Voters voted the president and the vice president separately.

Abra has long been considered part of the so-called Solid North, a voting bloc in northern Luzon historically aligned with the Marcos family and Ilocano political interests. The province, along with much of the Cordillera Administrative Region (CAR) and the Ilocos Region, was widely expected to deliver a decisive vote for the UniTeam ticket of Marcos and Sara Duterte well before election day.

Former senator Bongbong Marcos of Partido Federal ng Pilipinas won in the province of Abra in a landslide against his main opponent incumbent Vice President Leni Robredo, an independent. Marcos achieved 147,812 votes against Robredo's 4,502 votes. Marcos's vote share in Abra was the third-highest of any province or highly urbanized city in the country, trailing only two other provinces (Ilocos Norte and Sulu).

== Campaign ==
The campaign period for the 2022 presidential election ran from February 8 to May 7, 2022.

=== Marcos ===
Marcos held a campaign rally in Bangued, the provincial capital, on March 9, 2022, accompanied by senatorial candidates Sherwin Gatchalian, Harry Roque, Mark Villar, and Rodante Marcoleta. His running mate, Sara Duterte, was unable to attend due to bad weather in Davao City, which prevented her from flying out. Marcos apologized for her absence before the crowd and proceeded to hold a motorcade before moving on to a subsequent sortie in Kalinga.

=== Robredo ===
Robredo's campaign held a meet and greet with the Abra Electric Cooperative (ABRECO) and the volunteer group Abra for Leni at the Oval Era Mall in Bangued earlier in the campaign period. Robredo returned to the province on May 3, 2022, just days before election day, making Abra the final province she visited in her campaign, completing a full tour of all provinces in the Philippines. She thanked Bishop Leopoldo Jaucian and the clergy of the Diocese of Bangued for their assistance during the visit, and described the warmth she received from local volunteers as memorable. Robredo later acknowledged the difficulty of campaigning in the province, saying she was surprised to find volunteers still working on the ground there and calling them brave.

=== Other candidates ===
Senator Panfilo Lacson, another presidential candidate, did not hold any campaign sorties in the province. Instead, he met privately with the Bersamin family, one of Abra's prominent political dynasties, after announcing he would no longer campaign in the Ilocos provinces.

== Results ==
2022 Philippine presidential election in Abra
Party	Candidate	Votes	%
PFP	Bongbong Marcos	147,812	95.29%
Independent	Leni Robredo	4,502	2.90%
Independent	Ping Lacson	921	0.59%
Aksyon	Isko Moreno	708	0.46%
PROMDI	Manny Pacquiao	588	0.38%
Independent	Ernie Abella	178	0.11%
PDSP	Norberto Gonzales	129	0.08%
PLM	Leody de Guzman	113	0.07%
DPP	Jose Montemayor Jr.	96	0.06%
Katipunan	Faisal Mangondato	63	0.04%
Total votes		155,110	100.00%

=== By municipality ===
Municipality	Bongbong Marcos PFP		Leni Robredo Independent		Other candidates		Margin		Total
Municipality	#	%	#	%	#	%	#	%	Total
Bangued	27,283	92.55%	1,445	4.90%	751	2.55%	25,838	87.65%	29,479
Boliney	2,665	97.94%	34	1.25%	22	0.81%	2,631	96.69%	2,721
Bucay	10,298	95.72%	294	2.73%	167	1.55%	10,004	92.98%	10,759
Bucloc	1,737	95.76%	55	3.03%	22	1.21%	1,682	92.72%	1,814
Daguioman	1,230	96.77%	25	1.97%	16	1.26%	1,205	94.81%	1,271
Danglas	3,202	99.63%	10	0.31%	2	0.06%	3,192	99.32%	3,214
Dolores	7,163	94.90%	193	2.56%	192	2.54%	6,970	92.34%	7,548
La Paz	10,723	99.64%	25	0.23%	14	0.13%	10,698	99.41%	10,762
Lacub	2,245	94.05%	82	3.44%	60	2.51%	2,163	90.62%	2,387
Lagangilang	8,228	95.41%	231	2.68%	165	1.91%	7,997	92.73%	8,624
Lagayan	2,756	95.36%	69	2.39%	65	2.25%	2,687	92.98%	2,890
Langiden	2,312	99.27%	14	0.60%	3	0.13%	2,298	98.67%	2,329
Licuan-Baay	3,353	95.45%	77	2.19%	83	2.36%	3,276	93.25%	3,513
Luba	3,838	95.93%	95	2.37%	68	1.70%	3,743	93.55%	4,001
Malibcong	2,379	91.22%	161	6.17%	68	2.61%	2,218	85.05%	2,608
Manabo	6,593	94.35%	218	3.12%	177	2.53%	6,375	91.23%	6,988
Peñarrubia	3,686	94.22%	123	3.14%	103	2.63%	3,563	91.08%	3,912
Pidigan	7,436	95.33%	248	3.18%	116	1.49%	7,188	92.15%	7,800
Pilar	6,447	98.62%	58	0.89%	32	0.49%	6,389	97.74%	6,537
Sallapadan	4,321	96.45%	97	2.17%	62	1.38%	4,224	94.29%	4,480
San Isidro	2,701	95.58%	73	2.58%	52	1.84%	2,628	92.99%	2,826
San Juan	6,117	96.77%	136	2.15%	68	1.08%	5,981	94.62%	6,321
San Quintin	3,655	95.61%	116	3.03%	52	1.36%	3,539	92.57%	3,823
Tayum	8,255	92.66%	397	4.46%	257	2.88%	7,858	88.20%	8,909
Tineg	2,533	98.48%	22	0.86%	17	0.66%	2,511	97.63%	2,572
Tubo	3,155	92.31%	139	4.07%	124	3.63%	3,016	88.24%	3,418
Villaviciosa	3,501	97.14%	65	1.80%	38	1.05%	3,436	95.34%	3,604
Totals	147,812	95.29%	4,502	2.90%	2,796	1.80%	143,310	92.39%	155,110

== Analysis ==
Abra was among the 31 provinces that had been Marcos strongholds since the 2016 national elections, when Marcos ran for the vice presidency. The province's 2022 presidential result of 95.29% for Marcos represented a significant increase in vote share compared to 2016, when Marcos narrowly lost the vice-presidential race nationally to Robredo. CAR as a whole, of which Abra is a part, gave Marcos 91.37% of the vote in a head-to-head comparison against Robredo in 2022.

Of the 595 precincts nationwide that recorded zero votes for Robredo in the 2022 election, 45 were located in Abra, the largest number from any single province in the Cordillera and Ilocos regions. The other provinces in the area contributed 20 in Ilocos Norte, 16 in Ilocos Sur, 6 in Apayao, 3 in La Union, and 2 each in Kalinga and Ifugao.

== See also ==
- 2022 Philippine presidential election
- 2022 Philippine general election
