= Boliney =

Municipality in Abra, Philippines

- Municipality
- Municipality of Boliney
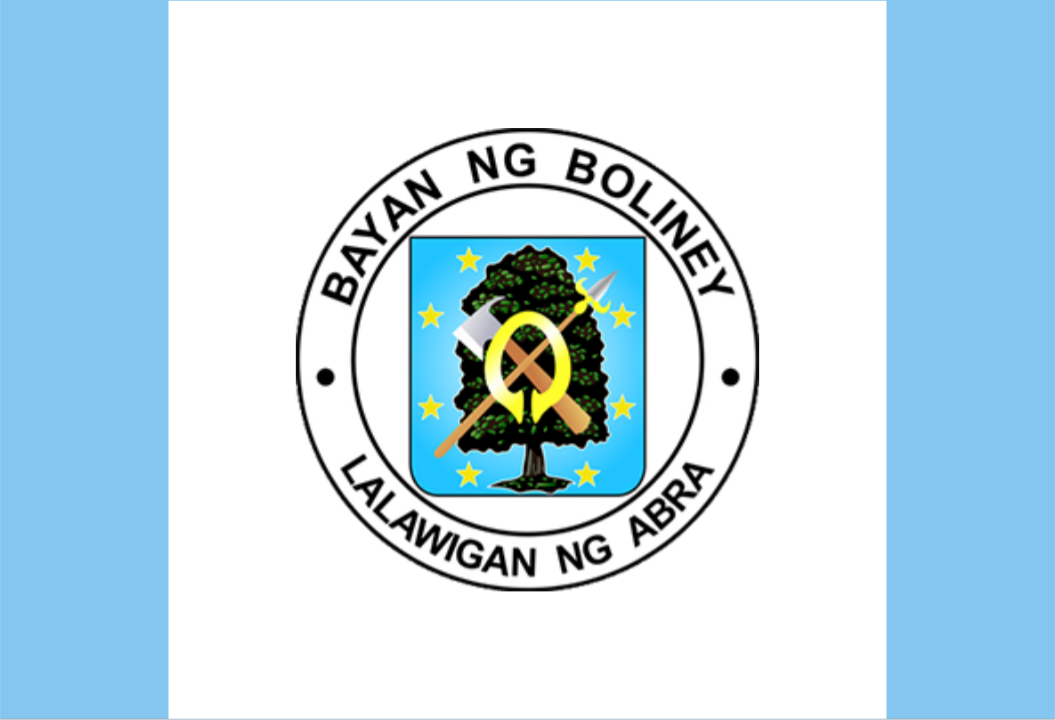
- Flag Seal

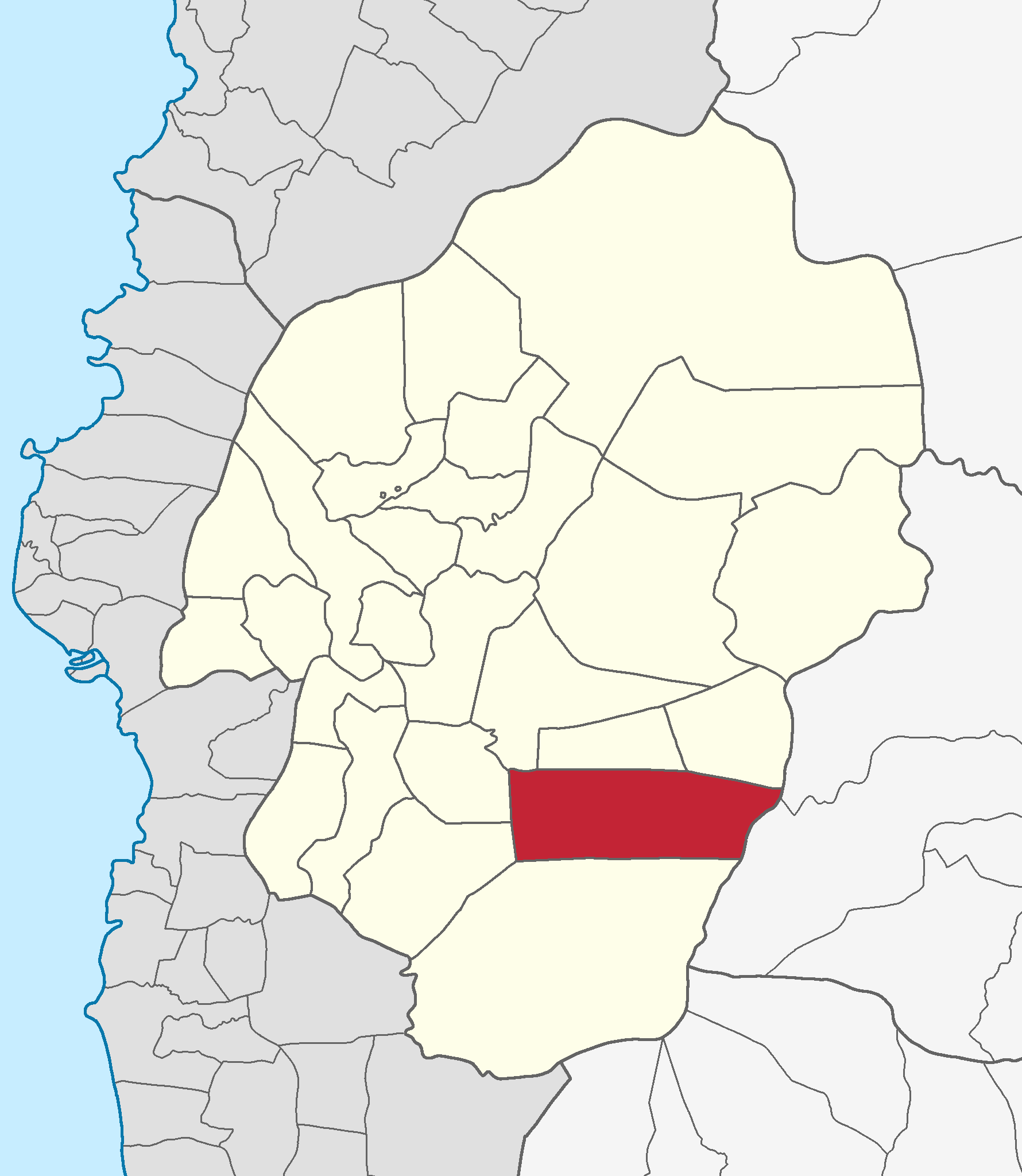
- Map of Abra with Boliney highlighted
- Interactive map of Boliney
- Location within the Philippines
- Coordinates: 17°23′N 120°49′E
- Country: Philippines
- Region: Cordillera Administrative Region
- Province: Abra
- District: Lone district
- Barangays: 8 (see Barangays)

Government
  - Type: Sangguniang Bayan
  - Mayor: Ronald S. Balao-as
  - Vice Mayor: Benipaz S. Balao-as
  - Representative: Joseph Santo Niño B. Bernos
  - Municipal Council: Members: Frances Lourdes C. Balao-as; Manuel Danilo S. Stimson Jr.; Jovilyn L. Magwelang; Christine Joy S. Pizarro; Dangwa B. Bersamin; Benjun D. Baggas; Nelson L. Bocaig; Balnawi S. Balao-as
  - Electorate: 3,011 voters (2025)

Area
  - Total: 216.92 km^{2} (83.75 sq mi)
- Elevation: 736 m (2,415 ft)
- Highest elevation: 1,520 m (4,990 ft)
- Lowest elevation: 275 m (902 ft)

Population (2024 census)
  - Total: 3,778
  - Density: 17.42/km^{2} (45.11/sq mi)
  - Households: 871

Economy
  - Income class: 3rd municipal income class
  - Poverty incidence: 19.59% (2023)
  - Revenue: ₱ 38.83 million (2012), 43.23 million (2013), 45.15 million (2014), 6.079 million (2015), 56.69 million (2016), 63.2 million (2017), 94.53 million (2018), 82.66 million (2019), 44.3 million (2011)
  - Assets: ₱ 40.26 million (2012), 14.15 million (2013), 16.92 million (2014), 32.97 million (2015), 39.62 million (2016), 40.16 million (2017), 95.22 million (2018), 90.89 million (2019), 35.52 million (2011)
  - Expenditure: ₱ 38.33 million (2012), 37.46 million (2013), 40.47 million (2014), 39.74 million (2015), 55.29 million (2016), 63 million (2017), 69.43 million (2018), 62.13 million (2019), 39.85 million (2011)
  - Liabilities: ₱ 4.382 million (2012), 0.8201 million (2013), 0.552 million (2014), 0.7203 million (2015), 7.783 million (2016), 7.816 million (2017), 27.78 million (2018), 2.869 million (2019), 0.1532 million (2011)

Service provider
  - Electricity: Abra Electric Cooperative (ABRECO)
- Time zone: UTC+8 (PST)
- ZIP code: 2815
- PSGC: 1400102000
- IDD : area code: +63 (0)74
- Native languages: Itneg, Ilocano, Filipino

Boliney, officially the Municipality of Boliney (Ilocano: Ili ti Boliney; Filipino: Bayan ng Boliney), is a municipality in the province of Abra, Philippines. According to the 2024 census, it has a population of 3,778 people.

== Geography ==
The Municipality of Boliney has a land area of 216.92 square kilometres (83.75 sq mi) constituting 5.21% of the 4,165.25-square-kilometre- (1,608.21 sq mi) total area of Abra. It is bounded to the north by Sallapadan, Bucloc, and Daguioman, to the east by Tubo and the provinces of Kalinga and Mountain Province, and to the west by of Luba and Manabo.

Boliney is situated 52.93 kilometres (32.89 mi) from the provincial capital Bangued, and 422.00 kilometres (262.22 mi) from the country's capital city of Manila.

=== Barangays ===
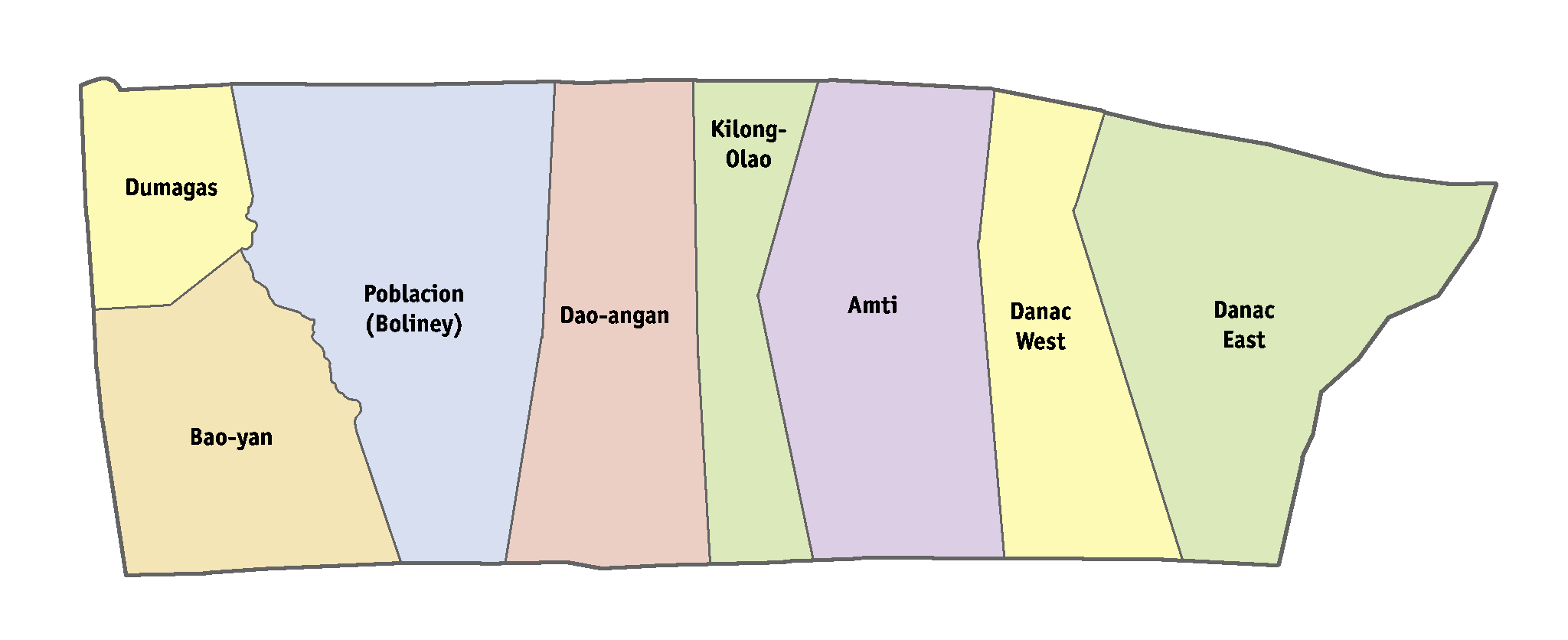
Political map of Boliney

Boliney is politically subdivided into 8 barangays. Each barangay consists of puroks and some have sitios.

PSGC	Barangay	Population			±% p.a.	
		2024		2010		
140102001	Amti	12.1%	459	411	▴	0.77%
140102002	Bao-yan	16.3%	617	577	▴	0.47%
140102003	Danac East	14.2%	538	518	▴	0.26%
140102008	Danac West	18.0%	681	618	▴	0.68%
140102004	Dao-angan	11.8%	446	399	▴	0.77%
140102005	Dumagas	13.6%	514	387	▴	1.99%
140102006	Kilong-Olao	7.3%	277	234	▴	1.18%
140102007	Poblacion (Boliney)	27.0%	1,019	919	▴	0.72%
	Total		3,778	4,551	▾	−1.28%

=== Climate ===
Climate data for Boliney, Abra
Month	Jan	Feb	Mar	Apr	May	Jun	Jul	Aug	Sep	Oct	Nov	Dec	Year
Mean daily maximum °C (°F)	26 (79)	27 (81)	29 (84)	31 (88)	30 (86)	30 (86)	29 (84)	29 (84)	29 (84)	29 (84)	28 (82)	26 (79)	29 (83)
Mean daily minimum °C (°F)	19 (66)	19 (66)	20 (68)	22 (72)	24 (75)	24 (75)	24 (75)	24 (75)	23 (73)	22 (72)	21 (70)	20 (68)	22 (71)
Average precipitation mm (inches)	23 (0.9)	28 (1.1)	33 (1.3)	64 (2.5)	232 (9.1)	242 (9.5)	258 (10.2)	266 (10.5)	245 (9.6)	201 (7.9)	87 (3.4)	69 (2.7)	1,748 (68.7)
Average rainy days	8.3	8.0	10.8	15.2	23.7	26.1	27.0	25.8	23.5	17.3	13.7	12.1	211.5
Source: Meteoblue

== Demographics ==
Population census of Boliney
Year	Pop.	±% p.a.
1918	945	—
1939	1,497	+2.21%
1948	1,579	+0.59%
1960	2,326	+3.28%
1970	3,175	+3.16%
1975	2,902	−1.79%
1980	3,060	+1.07%
1990	3,773	+2.12%
1995	3,156	−3.29%
2000	3,340	+1.22%
2007	3,349	+0.04%
2010	4,063	+7.29%
2015	3,573	−2.42%
2020	4,551	+5.22%
2024	3,778	−4.37%
Source: Philippine Statistics Authority

In the 2024 census, Boliney had a population of 3,778 people. The population density was 17 inhabitants per square kilometre (44/sq mi).

The municipality's population consists of the Cordillera sub-tribes, namely Masadiit of the Tingguian Tribes, Belwang of the Igorot and Balatoc of the Kalinga tribe. Descendants of the other Tinguian sub-tribes are also represented in Boliney such as Binongan, Banao, Maeng, Ammotan (now called Muyadan of Manabo).

== Economy ==
Poverty incidence of Boliney (%)

Source: Philippine Statistics Authority

The main source of livelihood of the people of Boliney comes from their rice terraces. However, many of these rice lands were severely damaged or completely destroyed by landslides, mudslides, and major earthquakes in 1990 and 1992. Today, most of their rice is sourced from Bangued, while other mountain municipalities supply rice to nearby lowland communities.

Rehabilitation have been on the communal facilities such as roads, trails, irrigation systems, footbridges and rice fields by the Masadiit Farmers Cooperative Inc. (MFCI) with the fund amounting to ₱2,903 million from the Presidential Management Staff and by the Inter NGO Disaster Relief Services (INDRS) with the fund amounting C$292,516.00, ₱7 million from Oxfam.

== Government ==
=== Local government ===
Boliney, belonging to the lone congressional district of the province of Abra, is governed by a mayor designated as its local chief executive and by a municipal council as its legislative body in accordance with the Local Government Code. The mayor, vice mayor, and the councilors are elected directly by the people through an election which is being held every three years.

=== Elected officials ===
Members of the Municipal Council (2025–2028)
Position	Name
Congressman	Joseph Santo Niño B. Bernos (Lakas)
Mayor	Ronald S. Balao-as (Lakas)
Vice-Mayor	Benipaz S. Balao-as (Lakas)
Councilors	Frances Lourdes C. Balao-as (Lakas)
Councilors	Manuel Danilo S. Stimson Jr. (Lakas)
Councilors	Jovilyn L. Magwelang (NPC)
Councilors	Christine Joy S. Pizarro (NPC)
Councilors	Dangwa B. Bersamin (Lakas)
Councilors	Benjun D. Baggas (IND)
Councilors	Nelson L. Bocaig (Lakas)
Councilors	Balnawi S. Balao-as (Lakas)

== Transportation ==
Boliney is situated 52.93 kilometres (32.89 mi) from the capital town of Bangued, and can be reached by road which was completed in 1974. Prior to this, it was accessible only by hiking a 24-kilometre (15 mi) long mountain trail.

After 1974, the road was extended by about 14 kilometres (8.7 mi) before reaching Danac, the farthest barangay. The present-day road is now as far as the Poblacion; however, the rest of the road has been abandoned.

== Education ==
The Boliney Schools District Office governs all educational institutions within the municipality. It oversees the management and operations of all private and public, from primary to secondary schools.

=== Primary and elementary schools ===
- Amti Elementary School
- Baoyan Elementary School
- Boliney Central School
- Danac Elementary School
- Dao-angan Primary School
- Dumagas Elementary School
- Kilong-olao Elementary School
- Lawigan Primary School

=== Secondary school ===
- Boliney National High School
