= Abra's at-large congressional district =

House of Representatives of the Philippines legislative district

- Constituency for the House of Representatives of the Philippines
- Location of Abra within the Philippines
- Province: Abra
- Region: Cordillera Administrative Region
- Population: 246,948 (2024)
- Electorate: 188,957 (2025)
- Area: 4,165.25 km^{2} (1,608.21 sq mi)

Current constituency
- Created: 1917 (single-member district)
- Representative: Joseph Bernos
- Political party: NUP
- Congressional bloc: Majority

Abra's at-large congressional district refers to the lone congressional district of the Philippines in the province of Abra. Abra has been represented in the country's various national legislatures since 1898. The first congressional delegation consisted of two members in the First Philippine Republic legislature known as the Malolos Congress. Since 1917 when it was re-established as a regular province separate from Ilocos Sur, Abra has been entitled to one member in the House of Representatives of the Philippines, elected provincewide at-large, except for a brief period between 1943 and 1944 when it was again represented by two members in the National Assembly of the Second Philippine Republic. From 1978 to 1984, all provinces were converted into multi-seat regional at-large districts for the Interim Batasang Pambansa of the Fourth Philippine Republic, with Abra forming part of the twelve-seat Region I's at-large district. It was restored as a single-member district in 1984.

The district served as an electoral district in the 1934 Constitutional Convention and in the 1971 Constitutional Convention, with two delegates representing Abra at-large in each.

The district is currently represented in the 20th Congress by Joseph Bernos of the National Unity Party (NUP).

== Recent election results from province-wide races ==
Year	Office	Results
2022	President	Bongbong Marcos (PFP) 95.29%
2022	Vice President	Sara Duterte (Lakas) 91.23%
2022	Governor	Dominic Valera (Asenso Abrenio) 51.10%
2025	Governor	Takit Bersamin (PFP) 79.30%

== List of members representing the district ==
=== Malolos Congress (1898–1901) ===
Seat A						Seat B						Legislature	Constituent LGUs
Portrait	Member	Term of office		Party	Electoral history	Portrait	Member	Term of office		Party	Electoral history	Legislature	Constituent LGUs
Portrait	Member	Start	End	Party	Electoral history	Portrait	Member	Start	End	Party	Electoral history	Legislature	Constituent LGUs
District created June 18, 1898.
	Isidro Paredes	September 15, 1898	March 23, 1901	Nonpartisan	Elected in 1898.		Juan Villamor	September 15, 1898	March 23, 1901	Nonpartisan	Elected in 1898.	Malolos Congress	1898–1901 [data missing]
District dissolved into Ilocos Sur's 3rd district for the Philippine Assembly.

=== House of Representatives (1916–1935) ===
Portrait	Member	Term of office		Legislature	Party	Electoral history	Constituent LGUs
Portrait	Member	Start	End	Legislature	Party	Electoral history	Constituent LGUs
District re-created March 9, 1917.
	Eustaquio Purugganan	March 9, 1917	June 6, 1922	4th Legislature	Nacionalista	Redistricted from Ilocos Sur's 3rd district.	1917–1935 [data missing]
	Eustaquio Purugganan	March 9, 1917	June 6, 1922	5th Legislature	Nacionalista	Re-elected in 1919.	1917–1935 [data missing]
	Adolfo Brillantes	June 6, 1922	June 2, 1925	6th Legislature	Nacionalista Colectivista	Elected in 1922.	1917–1935 [data missing]
	Quintín Paredes	June 2, 1925	November 15, 1935	7th Legislature	Nacionalista Consolidado	Elected in 1925.	1917–1935 [data missing]
	Quintín Paredes	June 2, 1925	November 15, 1935	8th Legislature	Nacionalista Consolidado	Re-elected in 1928.	1917–1935 [data missing]
	Quintín Paredes	June 2, 1925	November 15, 1935	9th Legislature	Nacionalista Consolidado	Re-elected in 1931.	1917–1935 [data missing]
	Quintín Paredes	June 2, 1925	November 15, 1935	10th Legislature	Nacionalista Democratico	Re-elected in 1934.	1917–1935 [data missing]

=== 1934 Constitutional Convention (1934–1935) ===
Seat A						Seat B						Legislature	Constituent LGUs
Portrait	Member	Term of office		Party	Electoral history	Portrait	Member	Term of office		Party	Electoral history	Legislature	Constituent LGUs
Portrait	Member	Start	End	Party	Electoral history	Portrait	Member	Start	End	Party	Electoral history	Legislature	Constituent LGUs
	Julio Borbon	July 30, 1934	February 19, 1935	Nonpartisan	Elected in 1934.		Jesus Paredes	July 30, 1934	February 19, 1935	Nonpartisan	Elected in 1934.	1934 Constitutional Convention	1934–1935 [data missing]

=== National Assembly (1935–1945) ===
==== Commonwealth ====
Portrait	Member	Term of office		Legislature	Party	Electoral history	Constituent LGUs
Portrait	Member	Start	End	Legislature	Party	Electoral history	Constituent LGUs
	Quintín Paredes	November 15, 1935	January 9, 1936	1st National Assembly	Nacionalista Democratico	Re-elected in 1935. Resigned on appointment as Resident Commissioner.	1935–1941 [data missing]
Vacant		January 9, 1936	September 1, 1936	1st National Assembly	—		1935–1941 [data missing]
	Agapito Garduque	September 1, 1936	December 30, 1938	1st National Assembly	Nacionalista	Elected in 1936 to finish Paredes's term.	1935–1941 [data missing]
	Quintín Paredes	December 30, 1938	December 30, 1941	2nd National Assembly	Nacionalista	Elected in 1938.	1935–1941 [data missing]

==== Second Republic ====
Seat A						Seat B						Legislature	Constituent LGUs
Portrait	Member	Term of office		Party	Electoral history	Portrait	Member	Term of office		Party	Electoral history	Legislature	Constituent LGUs
Portrait	Member	Start	End	Party	Electoral history	Portrait	Member	Start	End	Party	Electoral history	Legislature	Constituent LGUs
District re-created September 7, 1943.
	Quintín Paredes Jr.	September 25, 1943	February 2, 1944	KALIBAPI	Elected in 1943.		Juan Brillantes	September 25, 1943	February 2, 1944	KALIBAPI	Appointed as an ex officio member. (Note: As Governor of Abra.)	National Assembly (Second Republic)	1943–1944 [data missing]

=== House of Representatives (1945–1973) ===
Portrait	Member	Term of office		Legislature	Party	Electoral history	Constituent LGUs
Portrait	Member	Start	End	Legislature	Party	Electoral history	Constituent LGUs
District re-created May 24, 1945.
	Jesús Paredes	June 9, 1945	May 25, 1946	1st Commonwealth Congress	Nacionalista	Elected in 1941.	1945–1949 [data missing]
	Quintín Paredes	May 25, 1946	December 30, 1949	2nd Commonwealth Congress	Liberal	Elected in 1946.	1945–1949 [data missing]
	Quintín Paredes	May 25, 1946	December 30, 1949	1st Congress	Liberal	Elected in 1946.	1945–1949 [data missing]
	Virgilio Valera	December 30, 1949	December 30, 1953	2nd Congress	Liberal	Elected in 1949.	1949–1957; Alaca, Anayan, Ba-ay, Bangued, Bangilo, Boliney, Bucay, Bucloc, Buneg, Caganayan, Daguioman, Danao, Danglas, Dolores, La Paz, Lacub, Lagangilang, Lagayan, Lanec, Langiden, Licuan, Luba, Malibcong, Manabo, Mataragan, Naglibacan, Peñarrubia, Pidigan, Pilar, Sallapadan, San Isidro, San Juan, San Quintin, Tayum, Tiempo, Tineg, Tubo, Villaviciosa
	Lucas Paredes	December 30, 1953	December 30, 1965	3rd Congress	Democratic	Elected in 1953.	1949–1957; Alaca, Anayan, Ba-ay, Bangued, Bangilo, Boliney, Bucay, Bucloc, Buneg, Caganayan, Daguioman, Danao, Danglas, Dolores, La Paz, Lacub, Lagangilang, Lagayan, Lanec, Langiden, Licuan, Luba, Malibcong, Manabo, Mataragan, Naglibacan, Peñarrubia, Pidigan, Pilar, Sallapadan, San Isidro, San Juan, San Quintin, Tayum, Tiempo, Tineg, Tubo, Villaviciosa
	Lucas Paredes	December 30, 1953	December 30, 1965	4th Congress	Nacionalista	Re-elected in 1957.	1957–1965 [data missing]
	Lucas Paredes	December 30, 1953	December 30, 1965	5th Congress	Nacionalista	Re-elected in 1961.	1957–1965 [data missing]
	Carmelo Barbero	December 30, 1965	January 17, 1973	6th Congress	Liberal	Elected in 1965.	1965–1969; Bangued, Boliney, Bucay, Bucloc, Daguioman, Danglas, Dolores, La Paz, Lacub, Lagangilang, Lagayan, Langiden, Licuan, Luba, Malibcong, Manabo, Peñarrubia, Pidigan, Pilar, Sallapadan, San Isidro, San Juan, San Quintin, Tayum, Tiempo, Tineg, Tubo, Villaviciosa
	Carmelo Barbero	December 30, 1965	January 17, 1973	7th Congress	Liberal	Re-elected in 1969. Term cut short upon the ratification of a new Constitution.	1969–1973 [data missing]
District dissolved into the twelve-seat Region I's at-large district for the Interim Batasang Pambansa.

=== 1971 Constitutional Convention (1971–1972) ===
Seat A						Seat B						Legislature	Constituent LGUs
Portrait	Member	Term of office		Party	Electoral history	Portrait	Member	Term of office		Party	Electoral history	Legislature	Constituent LGUs
Portrait	Member	Start	End	Party	Electoral history	Portrait	Member	Start	End	Party	Electoral history	Legislature	Constituent LGUs
	Arturo Barbero	June 1, 1971	November 29, 1972	Nonpartisan	Elected in 1970.		Loreto Seares	June 1, 1971	November 29, 1972	Nonpartisan	Elected in 1970.	1971 Constitutional Convention	1971–1972 [data missing]

=== Batasang Pambansa (1978–1986) ===
Portrait	Member	Term of office		Legislature	Party	Electoral history	Constituent LGUs
Portrait	Member	Start	End	Legislature	Party	Electoral history	Constituent LGUs
District re-created February 1, 1984.
	Arturo Barbero	June 30, 1984	March 25, 1986	Regular Batasang Pambansa	KBL	Elected in 1984.	1984–1986 [data missing]

=== House of Representatives (1987–present) ===
Portrait	Member	Term of office		Legislature	Party	Electoral history	Constituent LGUs
Portrait	Member	Start	End	Legislature	Party	Electoral history	Constituent LGUs
District re-created February 2, 1987.
	Rudolfo Bernardez	June 30, 1987	June 30, 1992	8th Congress	LnB	Elected in 1987.	1987–present Bangued, Boliney, Bucay, Bucloc, Daguioman, Danglas, Dolores, La Paz, Lacub, Lagangilang, Lagayan, Langiden, Licuan-Baay, Luba, Malibcong, Manabo, Peñarrubia, Pidigan, Pilar, Sallapadan, San Isidro, San Juan, San Quintin, Tayum, Tineg, Tubo, Villaviciosa
	Rudolfo Bernardez	June 30, 1987	June 30, 1992	8th Congress	LDP	Elected in 1987.	1987–present Bangued, Boliney, Bucay, Bucloc, Daguioman, Danglas, Dolores, La Paz, Lacub, Lagangilang, Lagayan, Langiden, Licuan-Baay, Luba, Malibcong, Manabo, Peñarrubia, Pidigan, Pilar, Sallapadan, San Isidro, San Juan, San Quintin, Tayum, Tineg, Tubo, Villaviciosa
	Jeremias Zapata	June 30, 1992	June 30, 1998	9th Congress	Lakas	Elected in 1992.	1987–present Bangued, Boliney, Bucay, Bucloc, Daguioman, Danglas, Dolores, La Paz, Lacub, Lagangilang, Lagayan, Langiden, Licuan-Baay, Luba, Malibcong, Manabo, Peñarrubia, Pidigan, Pilar, Sallapadan, San Isidro, San Juan, San Quintin, Tayum, Tineg, Tubo, Villaviciosa
	Jeremias Zapata	June 30, 1992	June 30, 1998	10th Congress	Lakas	Re-elected in 1995.	1987–present Bangued, Boliney, Bucay, Bucloc, Daguioman, Danglas, Dolores, La Paz, Lacub, Lagangilang, Lagayan, Langiden, Licuan-Baay, Luba, Malibcong, Manabo, Peñarrubia, Pidigan, Pilar, Sallapadan, San Isidro, San Juan, San Quintin, Tayum, Tineg, Tubo, Villaviciosa
	Vicente Ysidro Valera	June 30, 1998	June 30, 2001	11th Congress	LDP	Elected in 1998.	1987–present Bangued, Boliney, Bucay, Bucloc, Daguioman, Danglas, Dolores, La Paz, Lacub, Lagangilang, Lagayan, Langiden, Licuan-Baay, Luba, Malibcong, Manabo, Peñarrubia, Pidigan, Pilar, Sallapadan, San Isidro, San Juan, San Quintin, Tayum, Tineg, Tubo, Villaviciosa
	Luis Bersamin Jr.	June 30, 2001	December 16, 2006	12th Congress	PDSP	Elected in 2001.	1987–present Bangued, Boliney, Bucay, Bucloc, Daguioman, Danglas, Dolores, La Paz, Lacub, Lagangilang, Lagayan, Langiden, Licuan-Baay, Luba, Malibcong, Manabo, Peñarrubia, Pidigan, Pilar, Sallapadan, San Isidro, San Juan, San Quintin, Tayum, Tineg, Tubo, Villaviciosa
	Luis Bersamin Jr.	June 30, 2001	December 16, 2006	13th Congress	KAMPI	Re-elected in 2004. Died in office.	1987–present Bangued, Boliney, Bucay, Bucloc, Daguioman, Danglas, Dolores, La Paz, Lacub, Lagangilang, Lagayan, Langiden, Licuan-Baay, Luba, Malibcong, Manabo, Peñarrubia, Pidigan, Pilar, Sallapadan, San Isidro, San Juan, San Quintin, Tayum, Tineg, Tubo, Villaviciosa
Vacant		December 16, 2006	June 30, 2007	13th Congress	—	No special election held to fill vacancy.	1987–present Bangued, Boliney, Bucay, Bucloc, Daguioman, Danglas, Dolores, La Paz, Lacub, Lagangilang, Lagayan, Langiden, Licuan-Baay, Luba, Malibcong, Manabo, Peñarrubia, Pidigan, Pilar, Sallapadan, San Isidro, San Juan, San Quintin, Tayum, Tineg, Tubo, Villaviciosa
	Cecilia Seares-Luna (born 1953)	June 30, 2007	June 30, 2010	14th Congress	Lakas	Elected in 2007.	1987–present Bangued, Boliney, Bucay, Bucloc, Daguioman, Danglas, Dolores, La Paz, Lacub, Lagangilang, Lagayan, Langiden, Licuan-Baay, Luba, Malibcong, Manabo, Peñarrubia, Pidigan, Pilar, Sallapadan, San Isidro, San Juan, San Quintin, Tayum, Tineg, Tubo, Villaviciosa
	Joy Bernos (born 1977)	June 30, 2010	June 30, 2016	15th Congress	PDSP (Asenso Abrenio)	Elected in 2010.	1987–present Bangued, Boliney, Bucay, Bucloc, Daguioman, Danglas, Dolores, La Paz, Lacub, Lagangilang, Lagayan, Langiden, Licuan-Baay, Luba, Malibcong, Manabo, Peñarrubia, Pidigan, Pilar, Sallapadan, San Isidro, San Juan, San Quintin, Tayum, Tineg, Tubo, Villaviciosa
	Joy Bernos (born 1977)	June 30, 2010	June 30, 2016	16th Congress	Liberal (Asenso Abrenio)	Re-elected in 2013.	1987–present Bangued, Boliney, Bucay, Bucloc, Daguioman, Danglas, Dolores, La Paz, Lacub, Lagangilang, Lagayan, Langiden, Licuan-Baay, Luba, Malibcong, Manabo, Peñarrubia, Pidigan, Pilar, Sallapadan, San Isidro, San Juan, San Quintin, Tayum, Tineg, Tubo, Villaviciosa
	Joseph Bernos	June 30, 2016	June 30, 2022	17th Congress	Liberal (Asenso Abrenio)	Elected in 2016.	1987–present Bangued, Boliney, Bucay, Bucloc, Daguioman, Danglas, Dolores, La Paz, Lacub, Lagangilang, Lagayan, Langiden, Licuan-Baay, Luba, Malibcong, Manabo, Peñarrubia, Pidigan, Pilar, Sallapadan, San Isidro, San Juan, San Quintin, Tayum, Tineg, Tubo, Villaviciosa
	Joseph Bernos	June 30, 2016	June 30, 2022	17th Congress	PDP–Laban (Asenso Abrenio)	Elected in 2016.	1987–present Bangued, Boliney, Bucay, Bucloc, Daguioman, Danglas, Dolores, La Paz, Lacub, Lagangilang, Lagayan, Langiden, Licuan-Baay, Luba, Malibcong, Manabo, Peñarrubia, Pidigan, Pilar, Sallapadan, San Isidro, San Juan, San Quintin, Tayum, Tineg, Tubo, Villaviciosa
	Joseph Bernos	June 30, 2016	June 30, 2022	18th Congress	Nacionalista (Asenso Abrenio)	Re-elected in 2019.	1987–present Bangued, Boliney, Bucay, Bucloc, Daguioman, Danglas, Dolores, La Paz, Lacub, Lagangilang, Lagayan, Langiden, Licuan-Baay, Luba, Malibcong, Manabo, Peñarrubia, Pidigan, Pilar, Sallapadan, San Isidro, San Juan, San Quintin, Tayum, Tineg, Tubo, Villaviciosa
	Ching Bernos	June 30, 2022	June 30, 2025	19th Congress	Nacionalista (Asenso Abrenio)	Elected in 2022.	1987–present Bangued, Boliney, Bucay, Bucloc, Daguioman, Danglas, Dolores, La Paz, Lacub, Lagangilang, Lagayan, Langiden, Licuan-Baay, Luba, Malibcong, Manabo, Peñarrubia, Pidigan, Pilar, Sallapadan, San Isidro, San Juan, San Quintin, Tayum, Tineg, Tubo, Villaviciosa
	Ching Bernos	June 30, 2022	June 30, 2025	19th Congress	Lakas (Asenso Abrenio)	Elected in 2022.	1987–present Bangued, Boliney, Bucay, Bucloc, Daguioman, Danglas, Dolores, La Paz, Lacub, Lagangilang, Lagayan, Langiden, Licuan-Baay, Luba, Malibcong, Manabo, Peñarrubia, Pidigan, Pilar, Sallapadan, San Isidro, San Juan, San Quintin, Tayum, Tineg, Tubo, Villaviciosa
	Joseph Bernos	June 30, 2025	Incumbent	20th Congress	Lakas	Elected in 2025.	1987–present Bangued, Boliney, Bucay, Bucloc, Daguioman, Danglas, Dolores, La Paz, Lacub, Lagangilang, Lagayan, Langiden, Licuan-Baay, Luba, Malibcong, Manabo, Peñarrubia, Pidigan, Pilar, Sallapadan, San Isidro, San Juan, San Quintin, Tayum, Tineg, Tubo, Villaviciosa
	Joseph Bernos	June 30, 2025	Incumbent	20th Congress	NUP	Elected in 2025.	1987–present Bangued, Boliney, Bucay, Bucloc, Daguioman, Danglas, Dolores, La Paz, Lacub, Lagangilang, Lagayan, Langiden, Licuan-Baay, Luba, Malibcong, Manabo, Peñarrubia, Pidigan, Pilar, Sallapadan, San Isidro, San Juan, San Quintin, Tayum, Tineg, Tubo, Villaviciosa

== Election results ==
=== 1936 special ===
1936 National Assembly special election in Abra's at-large district
Party	Candidate	Votes	%
Nacionalista	Agapito Garduque	3,320	47.19
Nacionalista	Jesus Paredes	2,525	35.89
Nacionalista	Adolfo Brillantes	1,190	16.92
Total votes		7,035	100.00
Nacionalista hold			

=== 1953 ===
1953 Philippine House of Representatives elections in Abra
Party	Candidate	Votes	%
Liberal	Lucas P. Paredes	16,895	71.87
Nacionalista	Marcelino Sayo	6,610	28.12
Liberal (ind.)	Virgilio Valera (incumbent)	1	0.00
Liberal	Agripino Brillantes	1	0.00
Independent	Crisostomo Pariñas	0	0.00
Total votes		23,507	100.00
Liberal hold			

=== 1965 ===
1965 Philippine House of Representatives elections in Abra
Party	Candidate	Votes	%
Liberal	Carmelo Barbero	19,952	56.53
Nacionalista	Antonio Paredes	13,054	36.98
Nacionalista	Agripino Brillantes	2,290	6.49
Total votes		35,296	100.00
Liberal gain from Nacionalista			

=== 1984 ===
1984 Philippine parliamentary election in Abra
Party	Candidate	Votes	%
KBL	Arturo Barbero	40,103	33.43
Independent	Jeremias Zapata	26,402	22.01
KBL	Elpidio Valera	18,355	15.30
KBL	Gavino Balbin	10,302	8.59
KBL	Eustaqio Padaoil	7,688	6.41
UNIDO	Demetrio Pre	5,099	4.25
Independent	Antonio Paredes	4,876	4.06
UNIDO	Romeo Bringas	4,500	3.75
Nacionalista	Leonides Benesa	2,103	1.75
Independent	Apolonio Enrile	433	0.36
Independent	Rodolfo Bernardes	102	0.09

=== 1992 ===
1992 Philippine House of Representatives elections in Abra
Party	Candidate	Votes	%
Lakas	Jeremias Zapata	31,731	49.32
KBL	Antonio Paredes	16,996	26.42
NPC	Rudolfo Bernardez (incumbent)	9,264	14.40
NPC	Benjamin Bringas	6,342	9.86
Total votes		64,333	100.00
Lakas gain from NPC			

=== 1995 ===
1995 Philippine House of Representatives elections in Abra
Party	Candidate	Votes	%
Lakas	Jeremias Zapata (incumbent)	54,823	74.02
Independent	Dionisio Tejero	12,719	17.17
NPC	Gil Valera	6,523	8.81
Total votes		74,065	100.00
Lakas hold			

=== 1998 ===
1998 Philippine House of Representatives elections in Abra
Party	Candidate	Votes	%
Lakas	Vicente Ysidro Valera	49,327	62.13
LAMMP	Conrado Balweg	28,891	36.39
KBL	Eustaquio Purugganan	888	1.12
Independent	Antonio Borgoña	154	0.19
Liberal	Johnny Guinaban	136	0.17
Total votes		79,396	100.00
Lakas hold			

=== 2010 ===
2010 Philippine House of Representatives election in Abra
Party	Candidate	Votes	%
PDSP	Joy Bernos	46,536	40.85
Lakas–Kampi	Cecilia Seares-Luna	45,454	39.90
Nacionalista	Ma. Zita Valera	11,249	9.87
PMP	Mailed Molina	10,677	9.37
Valid ballots		113,916	95.21
Invalid or blank votes		5,735	4.79
Total votes		119,651	100.00
PDSP gain from Lakas–Kampi			

=== 2013 ===
2013 Philippine House of Representatives election in Abra
Party	Candidate	Votes	%
Liberal	Joy Bernos (incumbent)	55,323	64.79
Nacionalista	Rolando Somera	19,116	22.39
Independent	Hans Roger Luna	10,952	12.83
Total votes		85,391	100.00
Liberal hold			

=== 2016 ===
2016 Philippine House of Representatives election in Abra
Party	Candidate	Votes	%
Liberal	Joseph Bernos	63,919	49.70
Nacionalista	Marco Bautista	53,814	41.84
Independent	Joselito Bringas	7,460	5.80
Lakas	Cecilia Seares-Luna	3,424	2.66
Valid ballots		128,617	91.92
Invalid or blank votes		11,307	8.08
Total votes		139,924	100.00
Liberal hold			

=== 2019 ===
2019 Philippine House of Representatives election in Abra
Party	Candidate	Votes	%
PDP–Laban	Joseph Bernos (incumbent)	115,081	84.27
PDDS	Victoria Seares-Corpus	18,251	13.37
Independent	Derdrei Roce Ifurung	3,226	2.36
Total votes		136,558	100.00
PDP–Laban hold			

=== 2022 ===
2022 Philippine House of Representatives election in Abra
Party	Candidate	Votes	%
Nacionalista	Ching Bernos	122,223	100.00
Total votes		122,223	100.00
Nacionalista hold			

=== 2025 ===
2025 Philippine House of Representatives election in Abra
Party	Candidate	Votes	%
Lakas	Joseph Bernos	137,542	84.96
Asenso	Mila Valera	23,094	14.26
Aksyon	Deydey Ifurung	1,262	0.78
Total votes		161,898	100.00
Lakas hold			

== See also ==
- Legislative districts of Abra

== Notes ==
House of Representatives of the Philippines
Preceded by Capiz's 1st congressional district	Home district of the speaker of the House of Representatives; August 23, 1933 – November 15, 1935	Succeeded by Negros Occidental's 3rd congressional district (as the home district of the speaker of the National Assembly)
