= Cecilia Seares-Luna =

Filipino politician

Cecilia M. Seares-Luna (born March 31, 1953) is a Filipino politician. A member of the Liberal Party, she was elected Member of the House of Representatives of the Philippines representing the Lone District of Abra from 2007 to 2010.

House of Representatives of the Philippines
Preceded by Luis Bersamin	Representative, Lone District of Abra; 2007–2010	Succeeded by Ma. Jocelyn Bernos
