= Pidigan =

Municipality in Abra, Philippines

- Municipality
- Municipality of Pidigan
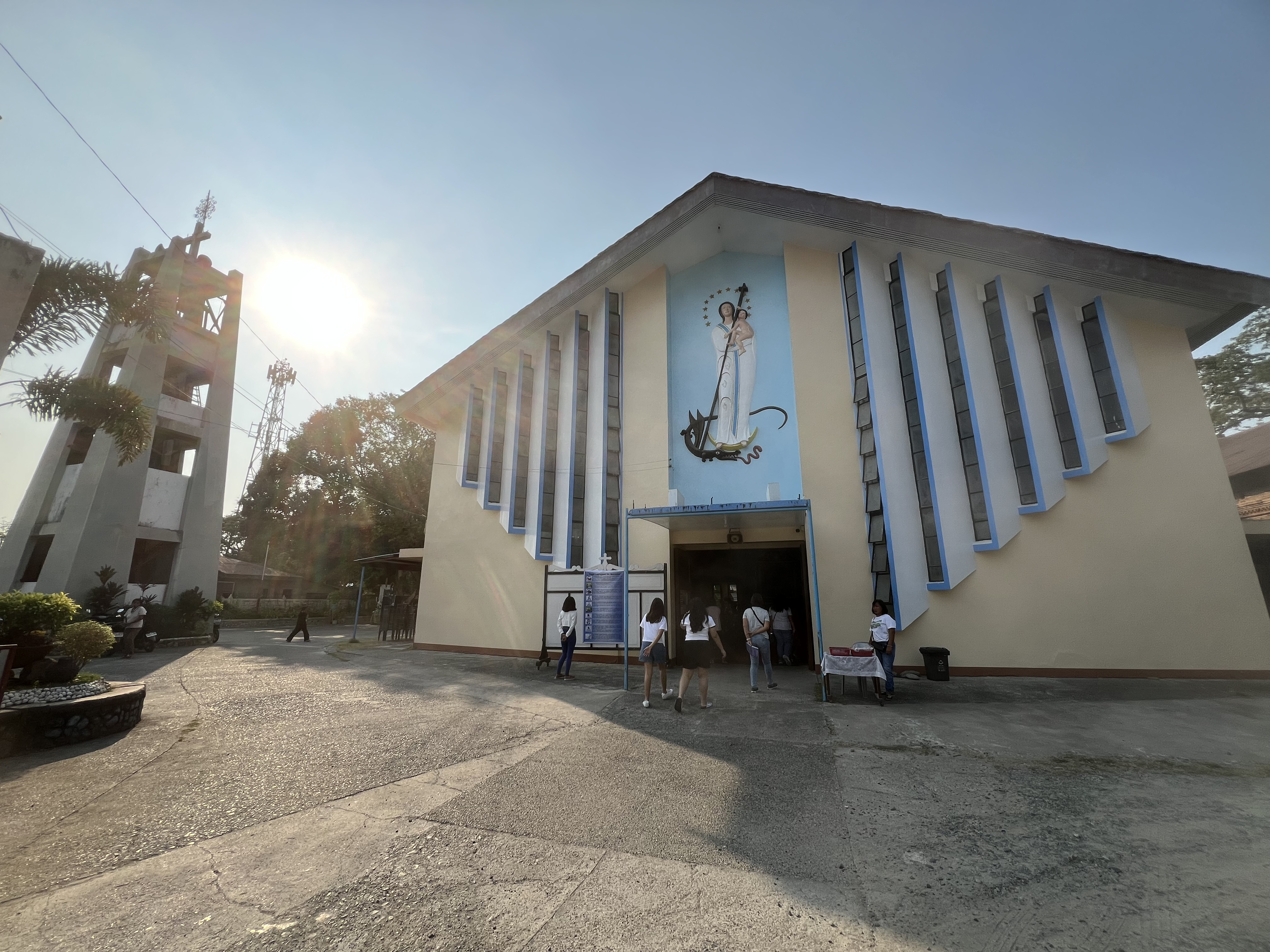
- Pidigan townscape Immaculate Conception Parish Church Pidigan Municipal Complex

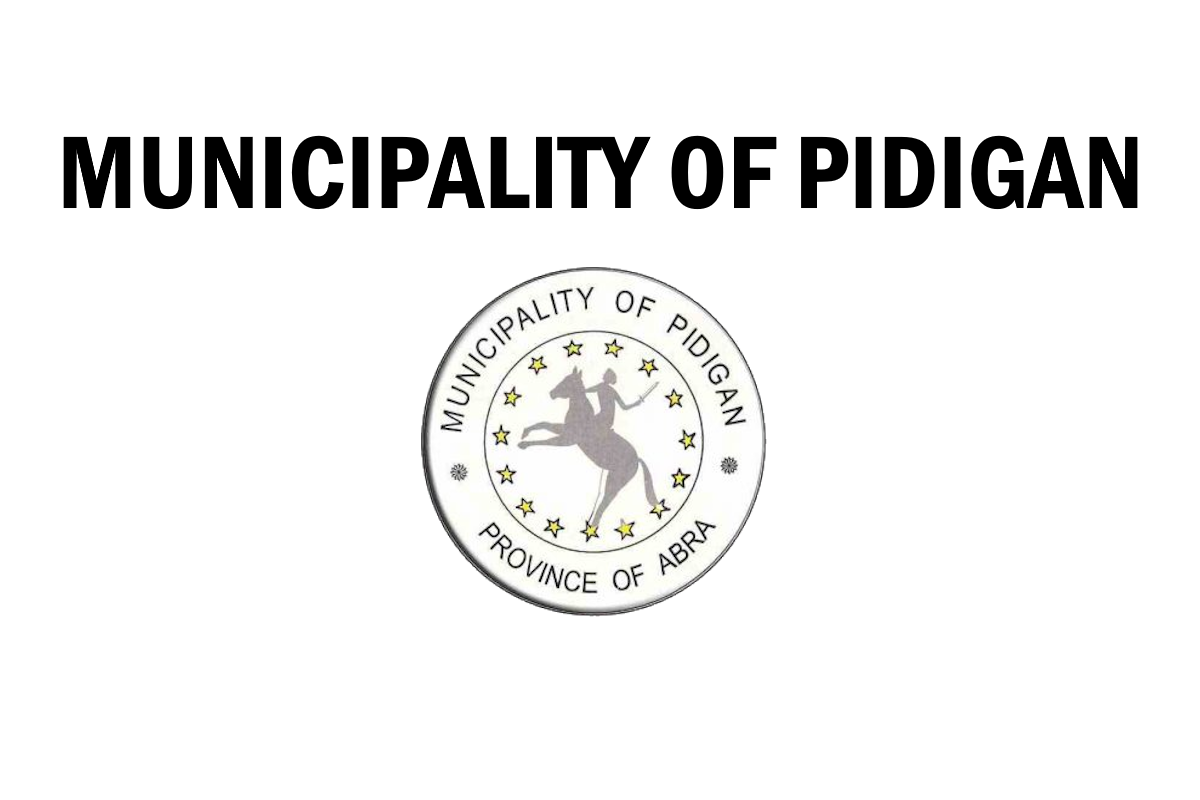
- Flag

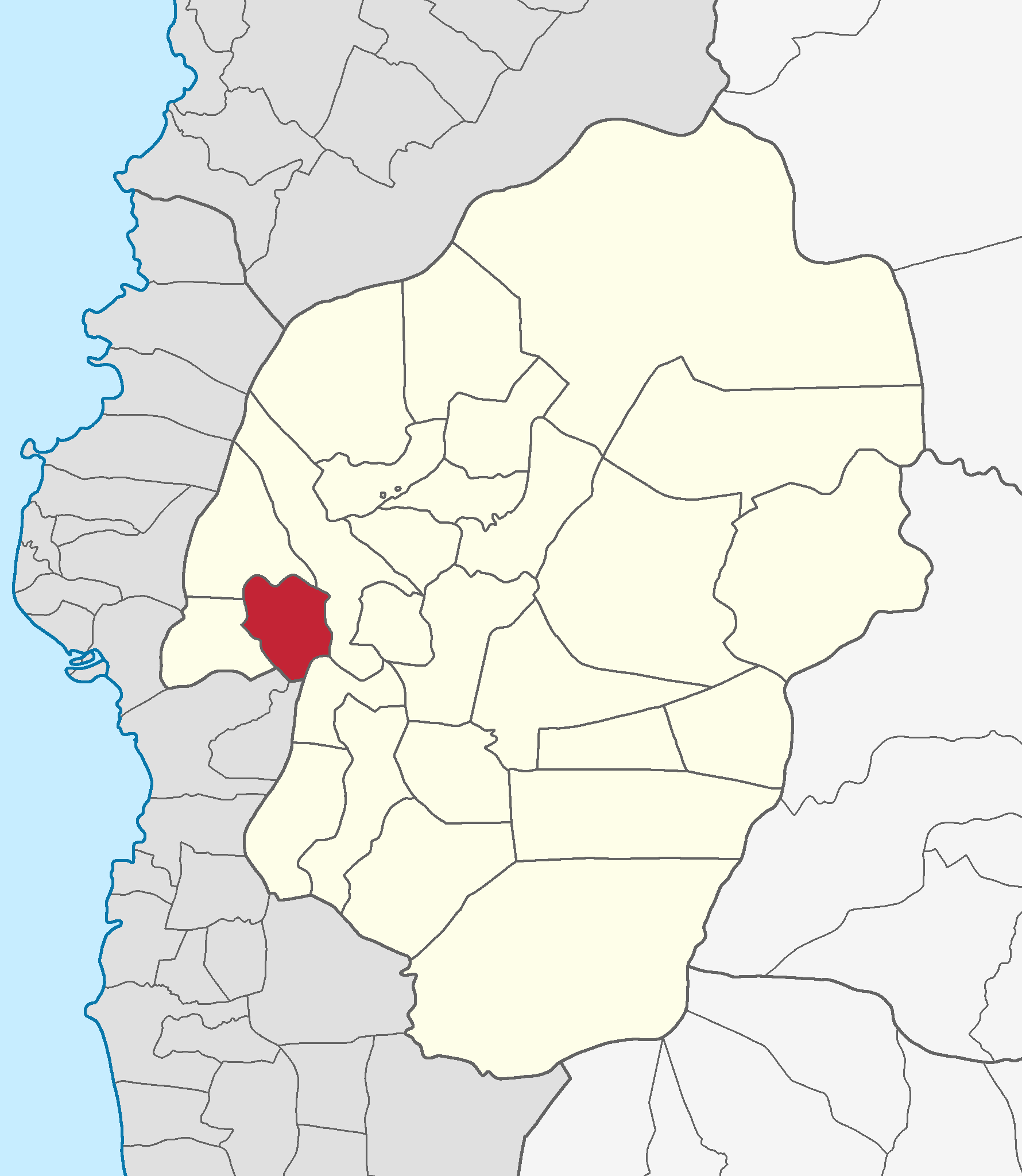
- Map of Abra with Pidigan highlighted
- Interactive map of Pidigan
- Location within the Philippines
- Coordinates: 17°34′N 120°35′E
- Country: Philippines
- Region: Cordillera Administrative Region
- Province: Abra
- District: Lone district
- Reestablished: January 1, 1913
- Barangays: 15 (see Barangays)

Government
  - Type: Sangguniang Bayan
  - Mayor: Artemio C. Donato Jr.
  - Vice Mayor: Arnulfo M. Bisares
  - Representative: Joseph Santo Niño B. Bernos
  - Municipal Council: Members: Noel M. Bisares; Vladimir P. Bilgera; Josephine P. Dalere; Jun A. Beleno; Melvin M. Dumlao; Raul P. Pilarta; Ruby B. Valera; Alvaro P. Apolinar
  - Electorate: 9,613 voters (2025)

Area
  - Total: 49.15 km^{2} (18.98 sq mi)
- Elevation: 90 m (300 ft)
- Highest elevation: 410 m (1,350 ft)
- Lowest elevation: 18 m (59 ft)

Population (2024 census)
  - Total: 12,058
  - Density: 245.3/km^{2} (635.4/sq mi)
  - Households: 3,004

Economy
  - Income class: 3rd municipal income class
  - Poverty incidence: 7.12% (2023)
  - Revenue: ₱ 44.15 million (2012), 39.44 million (2013), 60.98 million (2014), 73.64 million (2015), 98.83 million (2016), 55.28 million (2017), 139.6 million (2018), 58.37 million (2011)
  - Assets: ₱ 20.55 million (2012), 17.77 million (2013), 16.82 million (2014), 104.9 million (2015), 49.24 million (2016), 112.4 million (2017), 267.5 million (2018), 35.87 million (2011)
  - Expenditure: ₱ 40.84 million (2012), 37.13 million (2013), 39.29 million (2014), 50.1 million (2015), 43.97 million (2016), 48.33 million (2017), 54.32 million (2018), 29.65 million (2011)
  - Liabilities: ₱ 4.135 million (2012), 10.17 million (2013), 9.114 million (2014), 18.9 million (2015), 18.09 million (2016), 19.42 million (2017), 83.65 million (2018), 6.888 million (2011)

Service provider
  - Electricity: Abra Electric Cooperative (ABRECO)
- Time zone: UTC+8 (PST)
- ZIP code: 2806
- PSGC: 1400118000
- IDD : area code: +63 (0)74
- Native languages: Itneg; Ilocano; Tagalog

Pidigan, officially the Municipality of Pidigan (Ilocano: Ili ti Pidigan; Tagalog: Bayan ng Pidigan), is a municipality in the province of Abra, Philippines. According to the 2024 census, it has a population of 12,058 people.

== Geography ==
The Municipality of Pidigan is located at 17°34′N 120°35′E. According to the Philippine Statistics Authority, the municipality has a land area of 49.15 square kilometres (18.98 sq mi) constituting 1.18% of the 4,165.25-square-kilometre- (1,608.21 sq mi) total area of Abra.

Pidigan is situated 7.34 kilometres (4.56 mi) from the provincial capital Bangued, and 399.03 kilometres (247.95 mi) from the country's capital city of Manila.

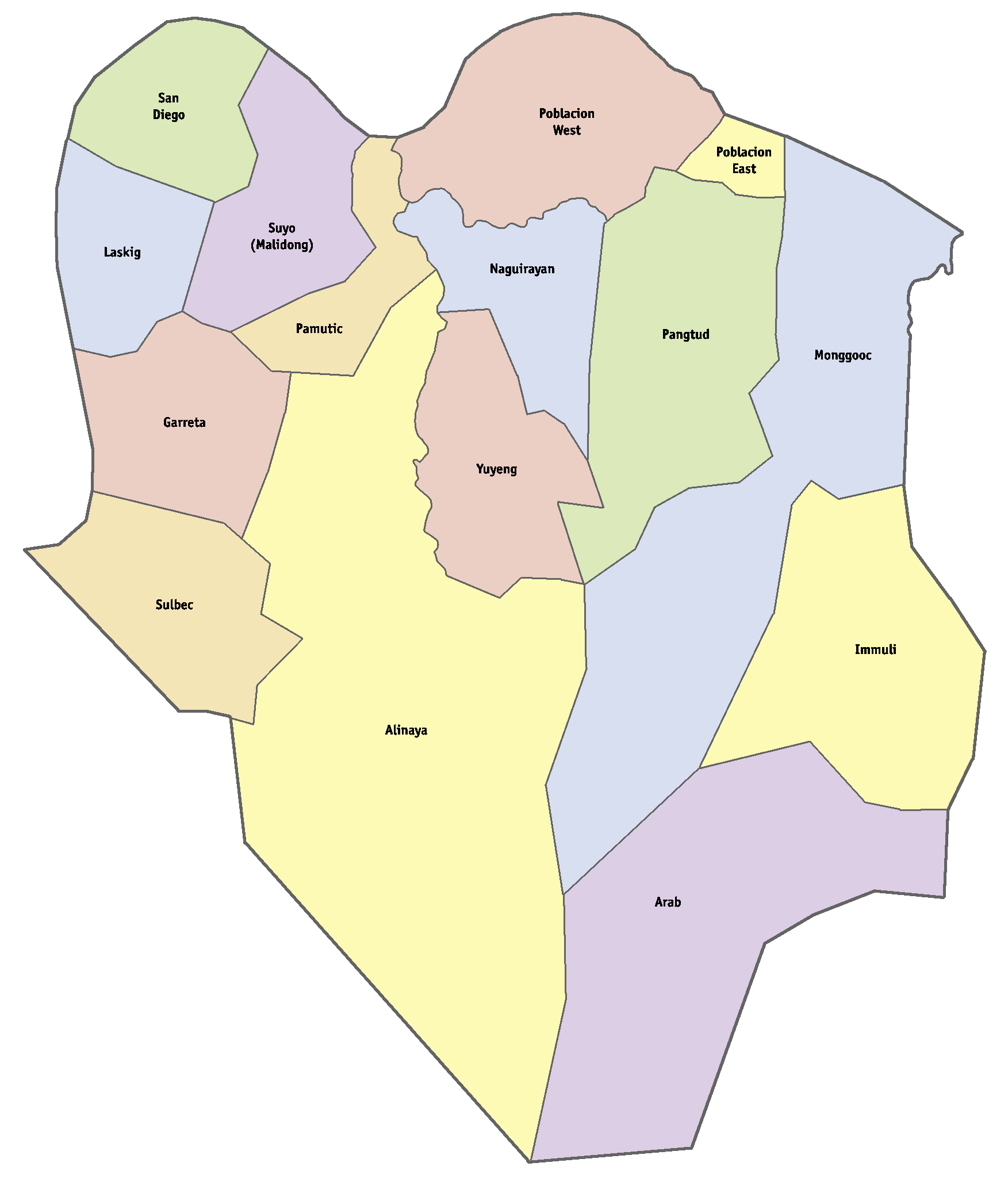
Political map of Pidigan

=== Barangays ===
Pidigan is politically subdivided into 15 barangays. Each barangay consists of puroks and some have sitios.

PSGC	Barangay	Population			±% p.a.	
		2024		2010		
140118001	Alinaya	8.4%	1,015	996	▴	0.13%
140118002	Arab	4.0%	479	458	▴	0.31%
140118004	Garreta	5.0%	599	582	▴	0.20%
140118005	Immuli	5.6%	674	557	▴	1.33%
140118007	Laskig	4.9%	590	484	▴	1.38%
140118009	Monggoc	10.0%	1,202	1,101	▴	0.61%
140118008	Naguirayan	5.8%	703	698	▴	0.05%
140118010	Pamutic	4.9%	596	566	▴	0.36%
140118011	Pangtud	11.5%	1,391	1,070	▴	1.84%
140118012	Poblacion East	14.0%	1,683	1,603	▴	0.34%
140118013	Poblacion West	9.7%	1,169	1,228	▾	−0.34%
140118014	San Diego	4.0%	477	442	▴	0.53%
140118016	Sulbec	6.3%	762	675	▴	0.84%
140118018	Suyo (Malidong)	5.8%	705	625	▴	0.84%
140118019	Yuyeng	3.6%	430	443	▾	−0.21%
	Total		12,058	11,528	▴	0.31%

=== Climate ===
Climate data for Pidigan, Abra
Month	Jan	Feb	Mar	Apr	May	Jun	Jul	Aug	Sep	Oct	Nov	Dec	Year
Mean daily maximum °C (°F)	29 (84)	31 (88)	32 (90)	34 (93)	32 (90)	31 (88)	30 (86)	30 (86)	30 (86)	30 (86)	30 (86)	29 (84)	31 (87)
Mean daily minimum °C (°F)	18 (64)	19 (66)	20 (68)	23 (73)	24 (75)	24 (75)	24 (75)	24 (75)	23 (73)	22 (72)	21 (70)	19 (66)	22 (71)
Average precipitation mm (inches)	9 (0.4)	11 (0.4)	13 (0.5)	23 (0.9)	92 (3.6)	122 (4.8)	153 (6.0)	137 (5.4)	139 (5.5)	141 (5.6)	42 (1.7)	14 (0.6)	896 (35.4)
Average rainy days	4.6	4.0	6.2	9.1	19.5	23.2	24.0	22.5	21.5	15.2	10.5	6.0	166.3
Source: Meteoblue

== Demographics ==
Population census of Pidigan
Year	Pop.	±% p.a.
1903	2,639	—
1918	3,864	+2.57%
1939	3,994	+0.16%
1948	3,473	−1.54%
1960	5,414	+3.77%
1970	6,605	+2.01%
1975	6,897	+0.87%
1980	7,162	+0.76%
1990	8,807	+2.09%
1995	9,098	+0.61%
2000	10,183	+2.44%
2007	11,280	+1.42%
2010	11,528	+0.79%
2015	12,185	+1.06%
2020	12,475	+0.50%
2024	12,058	−0.81%
Source: Philippine Statistics Authority

In the 2024 census, Pidigan had a population of 12,058 people. The population density was 250 inhabitants per square kilometre (650/sq mi).

== Economy ==
Poverty incidence of Pidigan (%)

Source: Philippine Statistics Authority

Rice, corn, and Virginia tobacco serve as the main sources of economy for Pidigan residents. The Negosyo Center was also built in Pidigan to boost small businesses. Pidigan's native delicacies include cornick and flavored snacks.

== Government ==
=== Local government ===
Pidigan, belonging to the lone congressional district of the province of Abra, is governed by a mayor designated as its local chief executive and by a municipal council as its legislative body in accordance with the Local Government Code. The mayor, vice mayor, and the councilors are elected directly by the people through an election which is being held every three years.

=== Elected officials ===
Members of the Municipal Council (2025–2028)
Position	Name
Congressman	Joseph Santo Niño B. Bernos
Mayor	Artemio C. Donato, Jr.
Vice-Mayor	Arnulfo M. Bisares
Councilors	Melvin M. Dumlao
Councilors	Noel M. Bisares
Councilors	Vladimir P. Bilgera
Councilors	Josephine P. Dalere
Councilors	Jun A. Beleno
Councilors	Raul P. Pilarta
Councilors	Ruby B. Valera
Councilors	Alvaro P. Apolinar

== List of Cultural Properties of Pidigan ==
Cultural Property wmph identifier (Note: wmph is an internal identifier used by Wikimedia Philippines to identify the monument. This is not an official identifier, and only shown temporarily in the templates until the government creates an updated complete list.)	Site name	Description	Province	City or municipality	Address	Coordinates	Image
	Pidigan Church	Immaculate Conception Church	Abra	Pidigan	Corner Santiago McKinley St.	17°34′15″N 120°35′21″E	Upload file
	St. Mary High School		Abra	Pidigan		17°34′15″N 120°35′23″E	Upload Photo
	Bringas Ancestral House Ruins	The house of former municipal mayor Jeremias Bringas. It was used as a provincial capitol when Pidigan was made the temporary seat of the Provincial Government of Abra in 1945.	Abra	Pidigan		17°34′11″N 120°35′26″E	Upload file
	Paaralan Sentral ng Pidigan/Pidigan Central School		Abra	Pidigan		17°34′10″N 120°35′24″E	Upload file
	Figueras Ancestral House	Old house owned by Sinforoso Figueras, the first municipal mayor of Pidigan from 1913 to 1919 and from 1943 to 1945.	Abra	Pidigan	Paredes St.	17°34′12″N 120°35′24″E	Upload file

== Education ==
The Pidigan Schools District Office governs all educational institutions within the municipality. It oversees the management and operations of all private and public, from primary to secondary schools.

=== Primary and elementary schools ===
- Arab Elementary School
- Banay Primary School
- Casilagan Primary School
- Garreta Elementary School
- Nagdaingan Elementary School
- Pangtud Primary School
- Pidigan Central School
- Poblacion West Primary School
- San Diego Elementary School
- Sulbec Primary School
- Suyo Pilot Elementary School
- Yuyeng Primary School

=== Secondary schools ===
- St. Mary High School
- Suyo National High School
