= Ilocos Sur's 3rd congressional district =

Legislative district of the Philippines

- Former constituency for the House of Representatives of the Philippines
- Province: Ilocos Sur

Former constituency
- Created: 1907
- Abolished: 1917

Ilocos Sur's 3rd congressional district was one of the three congressional districts of the Philippines in the province of Ilocos Sur in existence between 1907 and 1919. It was created in 1907 from former territories of the province under Philippine Commission Act No. 1582 following the passage of the 1902 Philippine Organic Act. The district was originally composed of the municipalities of Bangued, Bucay, Dolores, La Paz, Pilar, San Quintin and Santa, most of which were located in Abra, a sub-province of Ilocos Sur since 1905. It was a single-member district throughout the three legislatures of the Philippine Assembly from 1907 to 1916 and the first legislature of the House of Representatives from 1916 to 1919.

The district was represented by a total of only three representatives throughout its brief existence. It was abolished in 1917 following the passage of Legislative Act No. 2683 which created the province of Abra. As a result, Santa remained in Ilocos Sur and was redistricted to the 2nd district, while the other towns became part of Abra and were redistricted to its new at-large district. The district was last represented by Eustaquio Purugganan of the Nacionalista Party (NP), who also became the first representative of Abra's at-large congressional district following its dissolution.

== List of members representing the district ==
No.	Portrait	Member	Term of office		Legislature	Party	Electoral history	Constituent LGUs
No.	Portrait	Member	Start	End	Legislature	Party	Electoral history	Constituent LGUs
District created January 9, 1907.
1		Juan Villamor	October 16, 1907	October 16, 1912	1st Legislature	Nacionalista	Elected in 1907.	1907–1912; Bangued, Bucay, Dolores, La Paz, Pilar, San Quintin, Santa
1		Juan Villamor	October 16, 1907	October 16, 1912	2nd Legislature	Nacionalista	Re-elected in 1909.	1907–1912; Bangued, Bucay, Dolores, La Paz, Pilar, San Quintin, Santa
2		Julio Borbon	October 16, 1912	October 16, 1916	3rd Legislature	Nacionalista	Elected in 1912.	1912–1916; Bangued, Bucay, Dolores, La Paz, Pilar, San Quintin, Santa, Tayum
3		Eustaquio Purugganan	October 16, 1916	March 9, 1917	4th Legislature	Nacionalista	Elected in 1916. Redistricted to Abra's at-large district.	1916–1917; Bangued, Bucay, Dolores, La Paz, Pilar, San Quintin, Santa, Tayum
District dissolved into Abra's at-large district and Ilocos Sur's 2nd district.

== See also ==
- Legislative districts of Ilocos Sur
