= Pilar, Abra =

Municipality in Abra, Philippines

Pilar Villavieja
- Municipality
- Municipality of Pilar
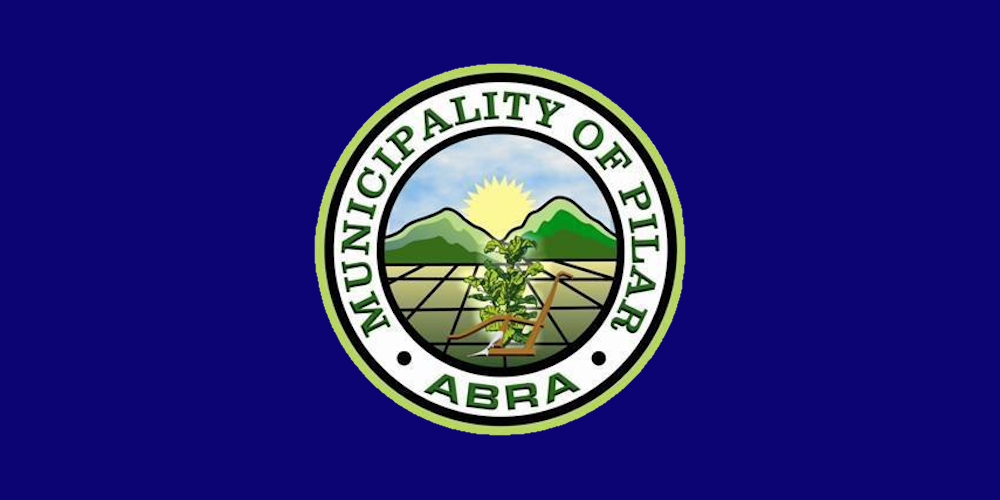
- Flag Seal

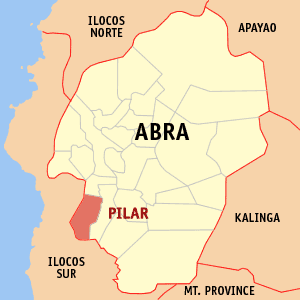
- Map of Abra with Pilar highlighted
- Interactive map of Pilar
- Location within the Philippines
- Coordinates: 17°25′N 120°36′E
- Country: Philippines
- Region: Cordillera Administrative Region
- Province: Abra
- District: Lone district
- Barangays: 19 (see Barangays)

Government
  - Type: Sangguniang Bayan
  - Mayor: Tyron Christopher R. Beroña
  - Vice Mayor: Mario D. Agbusac
  - Representative: Joseph Santo Niño B. Bernos
  - Municipal Council: Members: Ronald T. Dumlao; Cecilia T. Dumlao; Baltazar C. Beroña Jr.; Reginald D. Dumlao; Noel S. Beroña; Walter Y. Dait; Amando C. Dizon Jr.; Robert P. Domingo
  - Electorate: 8,086 voters (2025)

Area
  - Total: 66.10 km^{2} (25.52 sq mi)
- Elevation: 280 m (920 ft)
- Highest elevation: 634 m (2,080 ft)
- Lowest elevation: 34 m (112 ft)

Population (2024 census)
  - Total: 10,498
  - Density: 158.8/km^{2} (411.3/sq mi)
  - Households: 2,461

Economy
  - Income class: 1st municipal income class
  - Poverty incidence: 8.38% (2023)
  - Revenue: ₱ 1,788 million (2022)
  - Assets: ₱ 3,203 million (2022)
  - Expenditure: ₱ 624.2 million (2022)
  - Liabilities: ₱ 106.7 million (2022)

Service provider
  - Electricity: Abra Electric Cooperative (ABRECO)
- Time zone: UTC+8 (PST)
- ZIP code: 2812
- PSGC: 1400119000
- IDD : area code: +63 (0)74
- Native languages: Itneg; Ilocano; Tagalog

Pilar, officially the Municipality of Pilar (Ilocano: Ili ti Pilar, Tagalog: Bayan ng Pilar), is a municipality in the province of Abra in the Cordillera Administrative Region of the Philippines. According to the 2024 census, it has a population of 10,498 people.

== Geography ==
The Municipality of Pilar is located at 17°25′N 120°36′E. According to the Philippine Statistics Authority, the municipality has a land area of 66.10 square kilometres (25.52 sq mi) constituting 1.59% of the 4,165.25-square-kilometre- (1,608.21 sq mi) total area of Abra.

Pilar is situated 28.61 kilometres (17.78 mi) from the provincial capital Bangued, and 391.35 kilometres (243.17 mi) from the country's capital city of Manila.

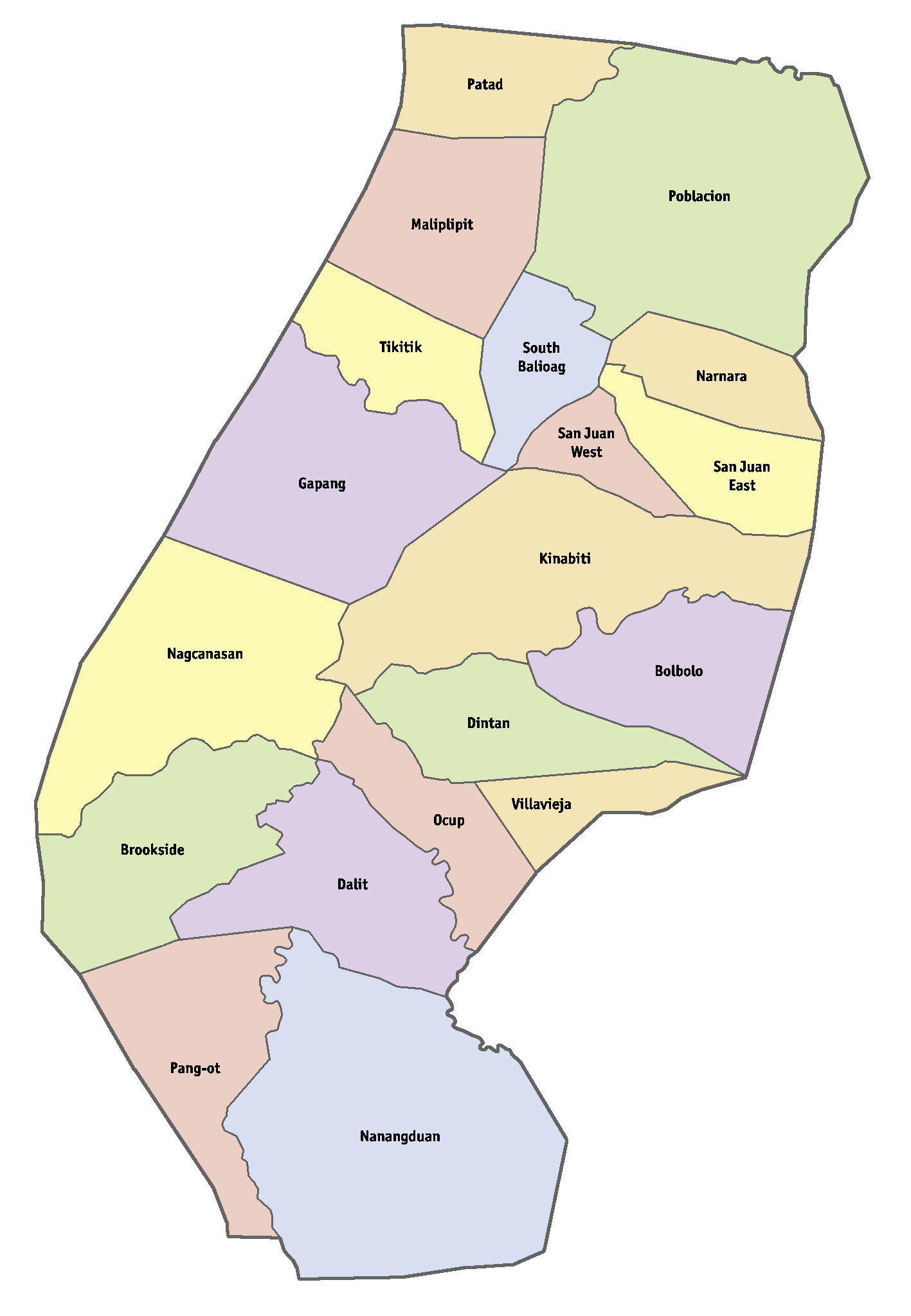
Political map of Pilar

=== Barangays ===
Pilar is politically subdivided into 19 barangays. Each barangay consists of puroks and some have sitios.

PSGC	Barangay	Population			±% p.a.	
		2024		2010		
140119002	Bolbolo	8.8%	919	851	▴	0.53%
140119003	Brookside	4.0%	422	366	▴	0.99%
140119005	Dalit	6.9%	727	773	▾	−0.42%
140119006	Dintan	3.4%	362	357	▴	0.10%
140119007	Gapang	6.1%	642	630	▴	0.13%
140119008	Kinabiti	7.9%	830	737	▴	0.83%
140119009	Maliplipit	2.9%	304	301	▴	0.07%
140119010	Nagcanasan	2.5%	263	259	▴	0.11%
140119011	Nanangduan	3.1%	323	329	▾	−0.13%
140119012	Narnara	2.9%	302	284	▴	0.43%
140119004	Ocup	5.2%	551	483	▴	0.92%
140119014	Pang-ot	5.6%	591	592	▾	−0.01%
140119015	Patad	2.7%	283	306	▾	−0.54%
140119016	Poblacion	15.9%	1,668	1,703	▾	−0.14%
140119017	San Juan East	2.8%	296	338	▾	−0.91%
140119018	San Juan West	6.3%	658	602	▴	0.62%
140119019	South Balioag	4.9%	510	470	▴	0.57%
140119020	Tikitik	2.8%	294	272	▴	0.54%
140119021	Villavieja	1.9%	201	255	▾	−1.63%
	Total		10,498	10,146	▴	0.24%

=== Climate ===
Climate data for Pilar, Abra
Month	Jan	Feb	Mar	Apr	May	Jun	Jul	Aug	Sep	Oct	Nov	Dec	Year
Mean daily maximum °C (°F)	28 (82)	29 (84)	30 (86)	32 (90)	30 (86)	29 (84)	28 (82)	28 (82)	28 (82)	29 (84)	29 (84)	28 (82)	29 (84)
Mean daily minimum °C (°F)	17 (63)	17 (63)	19 (66)	21 (70)	23 (73)	23 (73)	22 (72)	22 (72)	22 (72)	20 (68)	19 (66)	17 (63)	20 (68)
Average precipitation mm (inches)	10 (0.4)	10 (0.4)	14 (0.6)	23 (0.9)	80 (3.1)	103 (4.1)	121 (4.8)	111 (4.4)	119 (4.7)	114 (4.5)	39 (1.5)	15 (0.6)	759 (30)
Average rainy days	5.2	3.9	6.2	9.1	18.5	21.4	22.9	19.8	19.8	16.2	10.5	6.1	159.6
Source: Meteoblue

== Demographics ==
Population census of Pilar
Year	Pop.	±% p.a.
1903	2,569	—
1918	3,805	+2.65%
1939	5,792	+2.02%
1948	5,944	+0.29%
1960	6,025	+0.11%
1970	6,959	+1.45%
1975	7,453	+1.38%
1980	7,518	+0.17%
1990	8,451	+1.18%
1995	9,183	+1.57%
2000	9,328	+0.34%
2007	9,792	+0.67%
2010	9,908	+0.43%
2015	10,223	+0.60%
2020	10,146	−0.16%
2024	10,498	+0.82%
Source: Philippine Statistics Authority

In the 2024 census, Pilar had a population of 10,498 people. The population density was 160 inhabitants per square kilometre (410/sq mi).

== Economy ==
Poverty incidence of Pilar (%)

Source: Philippine Statistics Authority

Pilar's primary source of economy is tobacco farming. The municipality also benefits from national tobacco excise tax shares.

== Government ==
=== Local government ===
Pilar, belonging to the lone congressional district of the province of Abra, is governed by a mayor designated as its local chief executive and by a municipal council as its legislative body in accordance with the Local Government Code. The mayor, vice mayor, and the councilors are elected directly by the people through an election which is being held every three years.

=== Elected officials ===
Members of the Municipal Council (2025–2028)
Position	Name
Congressman	Joseph Santo Niño B. Bernos
Mayor	Tyron Christopher R. Beroña
Vice-Mayor	Mario D. Agbusac
Councilors	Cecilia T. Dumlao
Councilors	Baltazar C. Beroña, Jr.
Councilors	Walter Y. Dait
Councilors	Robert P. Domingo
Councilors	Ronald T. Dumlao
Councilors	Noel S. Beroña
Councilors	Reginald D. Dumlao
Councilors	Amando C. Dizon, Jr.

== Education ==
The Pilar Schools District Office governs all educational institutions within the municipality. It oversees the management and operations of all private and public, from primary to secondary schools.

=== Primary and elementary schools ===
- Bolbolo Elementary School
- Dalit Elementary School
- Dintan Elementary School
- Gapang Elementary School
- Kinabiti Elementary School
- Maliplipit Primary School
- Modesto-Luz Defiesta Primary School
- Nagcanasan Elementary School
- Ocup Primary School
- Pang-ot Elementary School
- Patad Primary School
- Pilar Central School
- San Juan Elementary School
- South Balioag Primary School

=== Secondary schools ===
- Bolbolo National High School
- Catholic High School of Pilar
- Dalit National High School
- Pilar Rural High School
