= Sallapadan =

Municipality in Abra, Philippines

- Municipality
- Municipality of Sallapadan
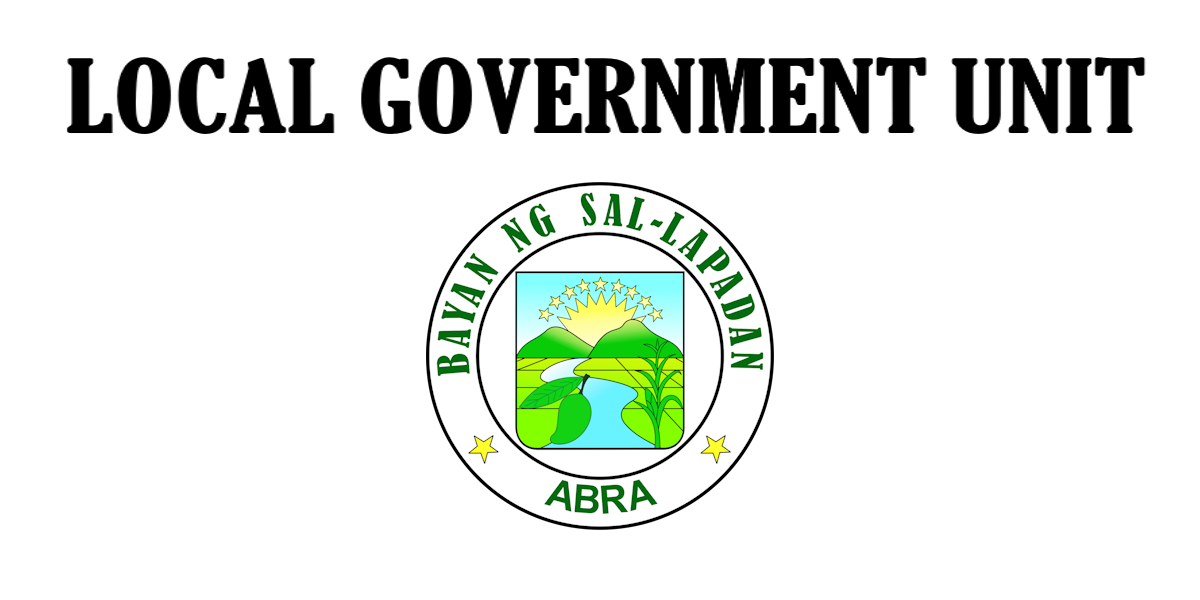
- Flag Seal

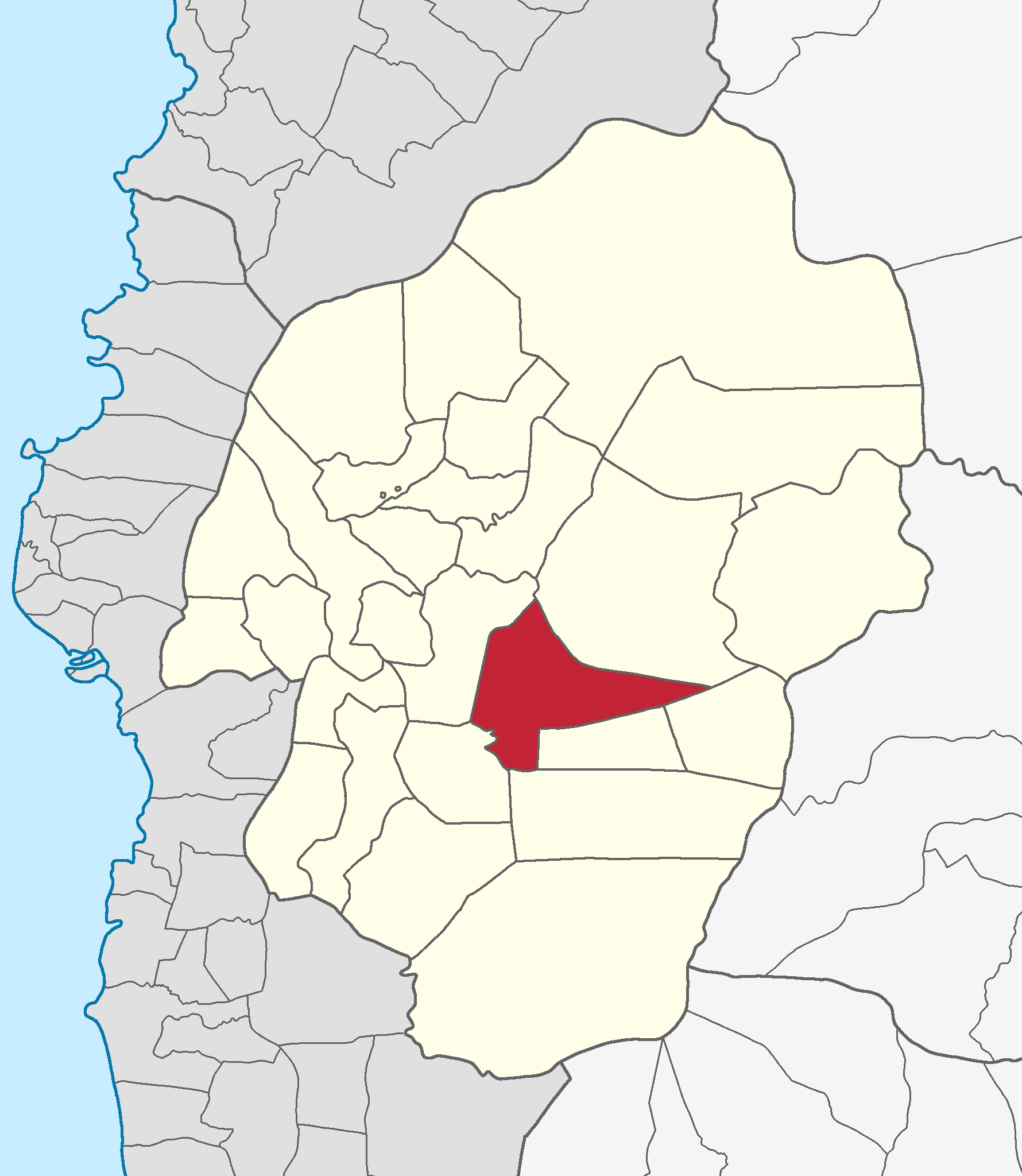
- Map of Abra with Sallapadan highlighted
- Interactive map of Sallapadan
- Location within the Philippines
- Coordinates: 17°28′N 120°46′E
- Country: Philippines
- Region: Cordillera Administrative Region
- Province: Abra
- District: Lone district
- Barangays: 9 (see Barangays)

Government
  - Type: Sangguniang Bayan
  - Mayor: Fernando A. Semanero Jr.
  - Vice Mayor: Garde H. Cardenas
  - Representative: Joseph Santo Niño B. Bernos
  - Municipal Council: Members: Cyrus Anthony C. Poblete; Jenzy James B. Agaid; Roberto S. Duclan; Arwin D. Domogma; Jonathan B. Ganti; Roxan G. Siwao; Eliza D. Dakiwas; Marc Peter A. Patdu
  - Electorate: 5,503 voters (2025)

Area
  - Total: 128.62 km^{2} (49.66 sq mi)
- Elevation: 292 m (958 ft)
- Highest elevation: 681 m (2,234 ft)
- Lowest elevation: 96 m (315 ft)

Population (2024 census)
  - Total: 6,328
  - Density: 49.20/km^{2} (127.4/sq mi)
  - Households: 1,464

Economy
  - Income class: 4th municipal income class
  - Poverty incidence: 10.72% (2023)
  - Revenue: ₱ 143.6 million (2022)
  - Assets: ₱ 469.6 million (2022)
  - Expenditure: ₱ 78.2 million (2022)
  - Liabilities: ₱ 96.71 million (2022)

Service provider
  - Electricity: Abra Electric Cooperative (ABRECO)
- Time zone: UTC+8 (PST)
- ZIP code: 2818
- PSGC: 1400120000
- IDD : area code: +63 (0)74
- Native languages: Itneg; Ilocano; Tagalog

Sallapadan, officially the Municipality of Sallapadan (Ilocano: Ili ti Sallapadan; Tagalog: Bayan ng Sallapadan), is a municipality in the province of Abra, Philippines. According to the 2024 census, it has a population of 6,328 people.

== Geography ==
The Municipality of Sallapadan is located at 17°28′N 120°46′E. According to the Philippine Statistics Authority, the municipality has a land area of 128.62 square kilometres (49.66 sq mi) constituting 3.09% of the 4,165.25-square-kilometre- (1,608.21 sq mi) total area of Abra.

Sallapadan is situated 42.04 kilometres (26.12 mi) from the provincial capital Bangued, and 414.74 kilometres (257.71 mi) from the country's capital city of Manila.

=== Barangays ===
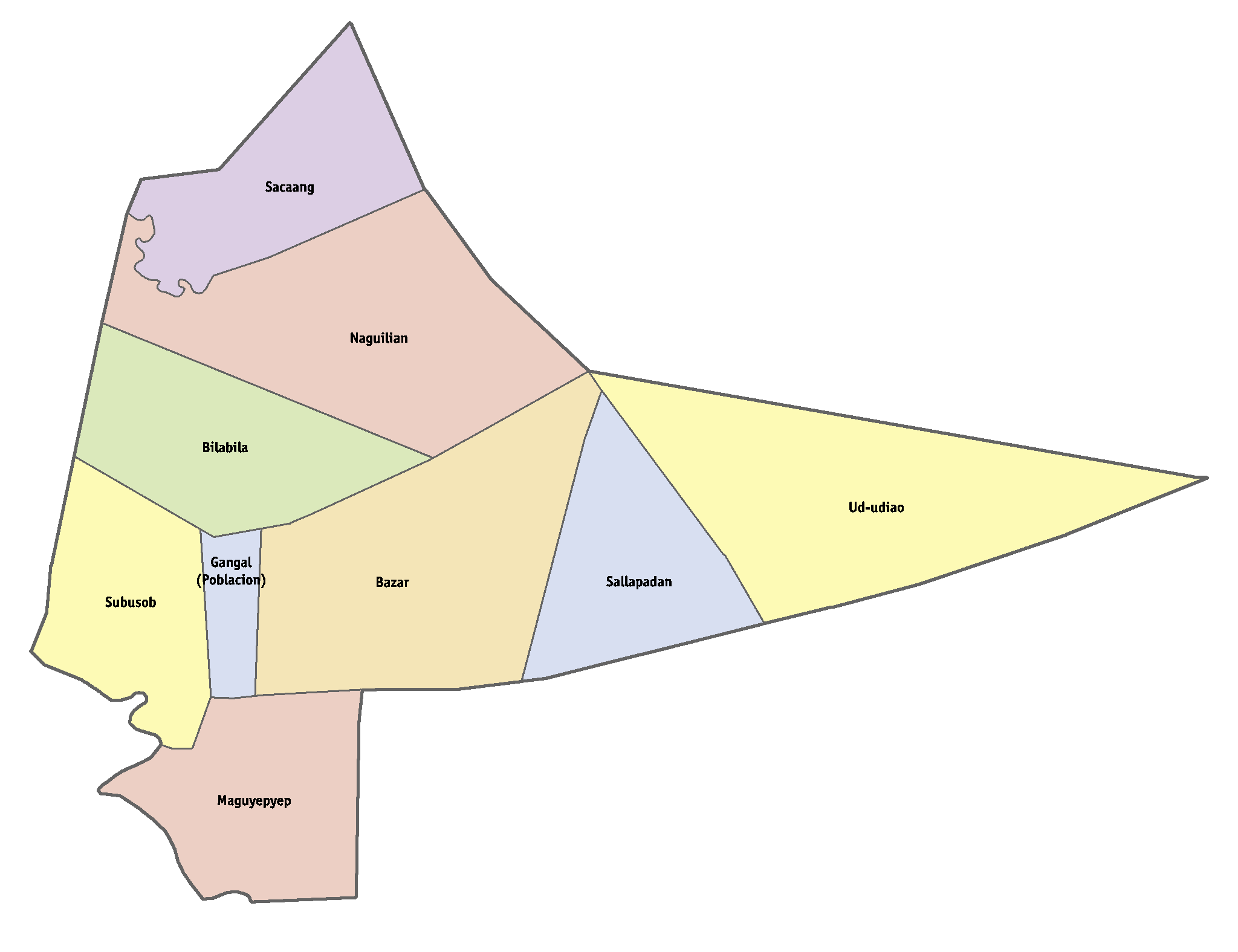
Political map of Sallapadan

Sallapadan is politically subdivided into 9 barangays. Each barangay consists of puroks and some have sitios.

| PSGC | Barangay | Population | | | ±% p.a. | |
| | | 2024 | | 2010 | | |
|---|---|---|---|---|---|---|
| 140120001 | Bazar | 8.1% | 514 | 527 | ▾ | −0.17% |
| 140120002 | Bilabila | 9.3% | 591 | 540 | ▴ | 0.63% |
| 140120003 | Gangal (Poblacion) | 13.7% | 866 | 921 | ▾ | −0.43% |
| 140120004 | Maguyepyep | 19.1% | 1,207 | 1,113 | ▴ | 0.56% |
| 140120005 | Naguilian | 11.4% | 719 | 636 | ▴ | 0.85% |
| 140120006 | Saccaang | 13.6% | 861 | 665 | ▴ | 1.81% |
| 140120007 | Sallapadan | 6.2% | 390 | 299 | ▴ | 1.86% |
| 140120008 | Subusob | 11.5% | 725 | 805 | ▾ | −0.72% |
| 140120009 | Ud-udiao | 8.2% | 516 | 479 | ▴ | 0.52% |
| | Total | | 6,328 | 5,985 | ▴ | 0.39% |

=== Climate ===
Climate data for Sallapadan, Abra
| Month | Jan | Feb | Mar | Apr | May | Jun | Jul | Aug | Sep | Oct | Nov | Dec | Year |
|---|---|---|---|---|---|---|---|---|---|---|---|---|---|
| Mean daily maximum °C (°F) | 27 (81) | 28 (82) | 30 (86) | 32 (90) | 31 (88) | 31 (88) | 30 (86) | 29 (84) | 30 (86) | 29 (84) | 28 (82) | 27 (81) | 29 (85) |
| Mean daily minimum °C (°F) | 19 (66) | 20 (68) | 21 (70) | 23 (73) | 24 (75) | 24 (75) | 24 (75) | 24 (75) | 24 (75) | 22 (72) | 22 (72) | 21 (70) | 22 (72) |
| Average precipitation mm (inches) | 23 (0.9) | 28 (1.1) | 33 (1.3) | 64 (2.5) | 232 (9.1) | 242 (9.5) | 258 (10.2) | 266 (10.5) | 245 (9.6) | 201 (7.9) | 87 (3.4) | 69 (2.7) | 1,748 (68.7) |
| Average rainy days | 8.3 | 8.0 | 10.8 | 15.2 | 23.7 | 26.1 | 27.0 | 25.8 | 23.5 | 17.3 | 13.7 | 12.1 | 211.5 |
Source: Meteoblue

== Demographics ==
Population census of Sallapadan
| Year | Pop. | ±% p.a. |
|---|---|---|
| 1918 | 1,601 | — |
| 1939 | 2,038 | +1.16% |
| 1948 | 2,313 | +1.42% |
| 1960 | 3,450 | +3.39% |
| 1970 | 3,551 | +0.29% |
| 1975 | 3,838 | +1.57% |
| 1980 | 4,274 | +2.17% |
| 1990 | 4,941 | +1.46% |
| 1995 | 5,303 | +1.33% |
| 2000 | 5,497 | +0.77% |
| 2007 | 6,370 | +2.05% |
| 2010 | 5,985 | −2.24% |
| 2015 | 6,622 | +1.94% |
| 2020 | 6,389 | −0.75% |
| 2024 | 6,328 | −0.23% |
Source: Philippine Statistics Authority

In the 2024 census, Sallapadan had a population of 6,328 people. The population density was 49 inhabitants per square kilometre (130/sq mi).

== Economy ==
Poverty incidence of Sallapadan (%)

Source: Philippine Statistics Authority

Farming serves as the primary backbone in Sallapadan.

Connectivity has improved in Sallapadan via the concrete ₱63.8 million Sallapadan Barrio–Ud-udiao farm-to-market road project, which helps lower post-harvest transport costs.

== Government ==
=== Local government ===
Sallapadan, belonging to the lone congressional district of the province of Abra, is governed by a mayor designated as its local chief executive and by a municipal council as its legislative body in accordance with the Local Government Code. The mayor, vice mayor, and the councilors are elected directly by the people through an election which is being held every three years.

=== Elected officials ===
Members of the Municipal Council (2025–2028)
| Position | Name |
|---|---|
| Congressman | Joseph Santo Niño B. Bernos |
| Mayor | Fernando A. Semanero Jr. |
| Vice-Mayor | Garde H. Cardenas |
| Councilors | Cyrus Anthony C. Poblete |
| Councilors | Jenzy James B. Agaid |
| Councilors | Roberto S. Duclan |
| Councilors | Arwin D. Domogma |
| Councilors | Eliza D. Dakiwas |
| Councilors | Jonathan S. Ganti |
| Councilors | Roxan G. Siwao |
| Councilors | Marc Peter A. Patdu |

== Education ==
The Sallapadan Schools District Office governs all educational institutions within the municipality. It oversees the management and operations of all private and public, from primary to secondary schools.

=== Primary and elementary schools ===
- Abas Elementary School
- Bantay Primary School
- Bazar Elementary School
- Bilabila Elementary School
- Callaban Primary School
- Gangal Elementary School
- Lam-aoan Primary School
- Manicbel Primary School
- Naguilian Elementary School
- Nangas-Asan Primary School
- Sallapadan Bo. Elementary School
- Sal-lapadan Central School
- Ud-udiao Elementary School

=== Secondary schools ===
- Abas National High School
- Maguyepyep Integrated School
- Father Arnoldus High School
