= Daguioman =

Municipality in Abra, Philippines

- Municipality
- Municipality of Daguioman
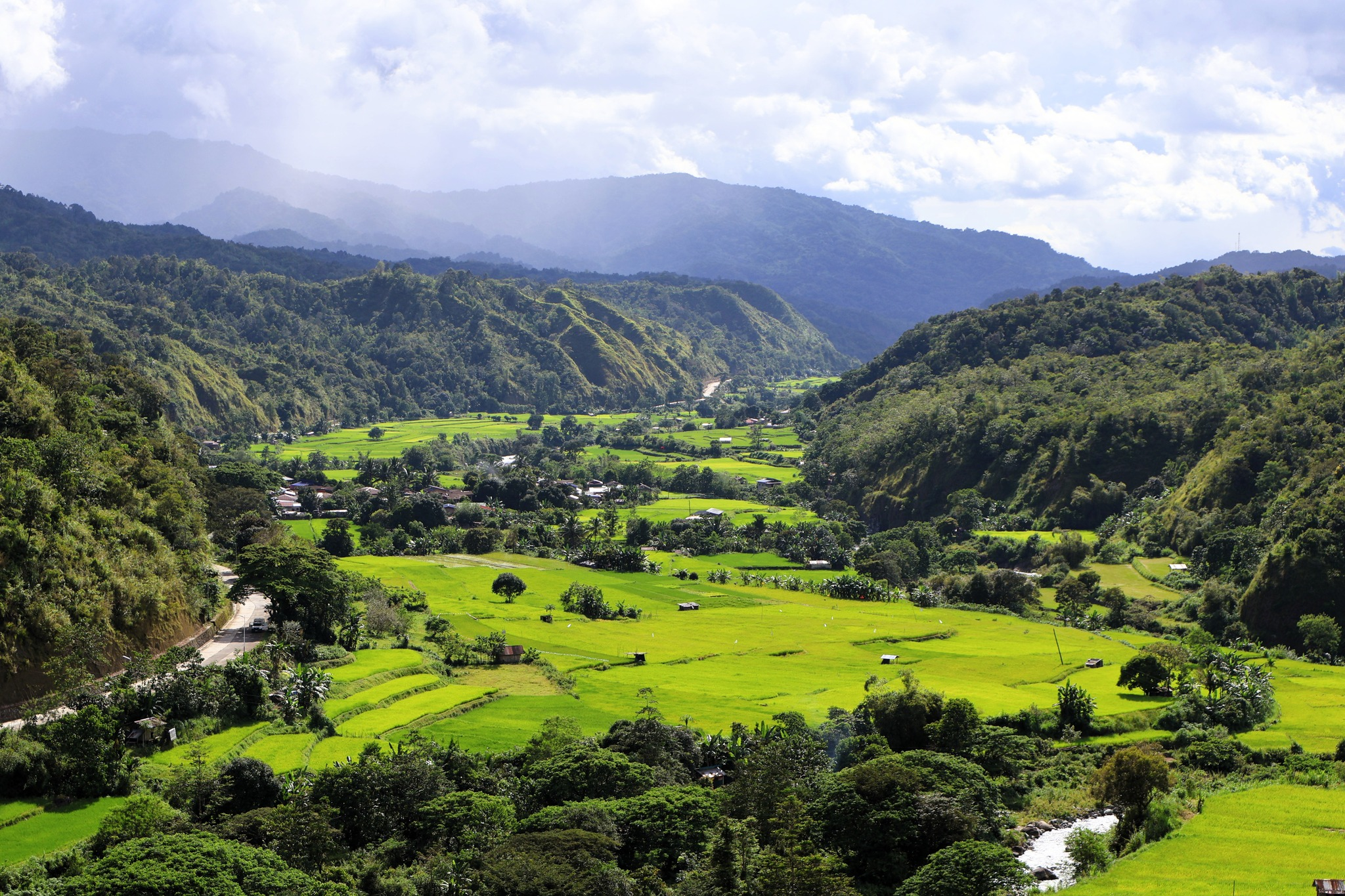
- Aerial view

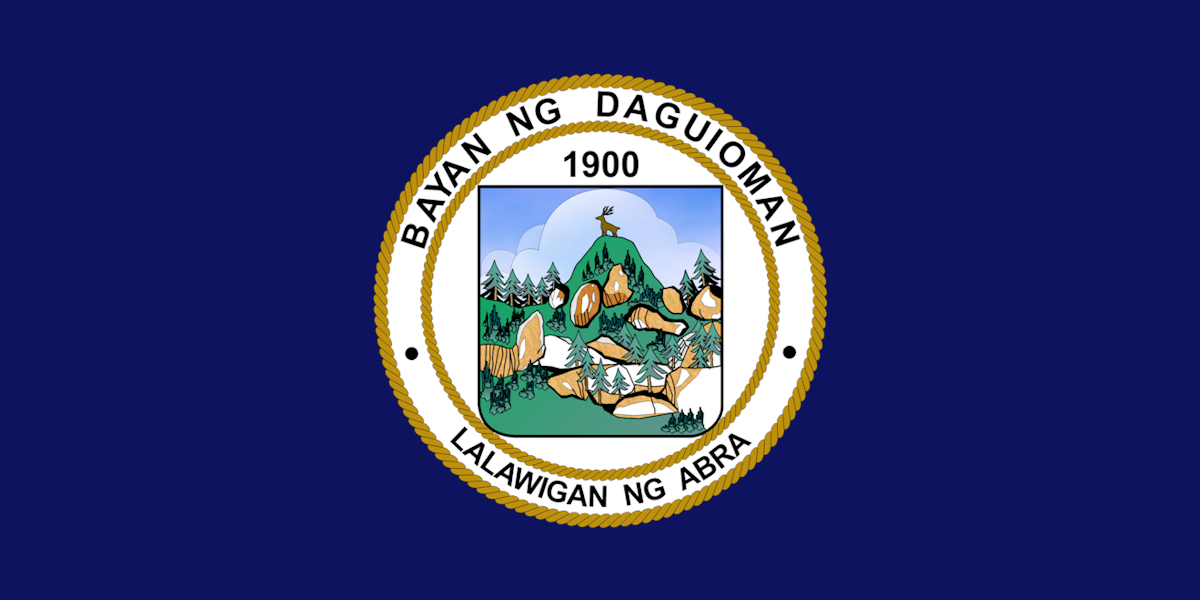
- Flag Seal

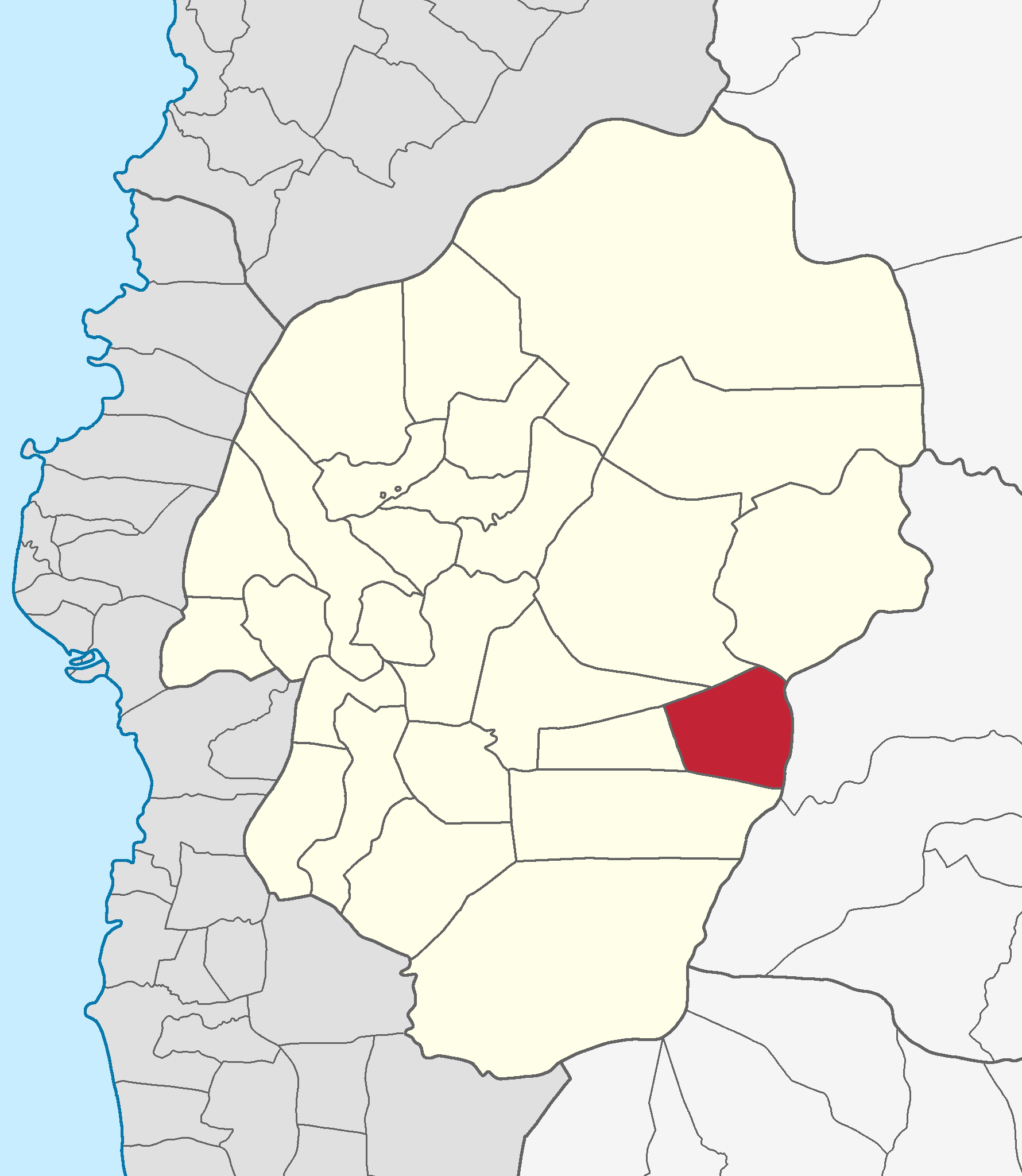
- Map of Abra with Daguioman highlighted
- Interactive map of Daguioman
- Location within the Philippines
- Coordinates: 17°28′N 120°56′E
- Country: Philippines
- Region: Cordillera Administrative Region
- Province: Abra
- District: Lone district
- Barangays: 4 (see Barangays)

Government
  - Type: Sangguniang Bayan
  - Mayor: Salma Q. Padilla
  - Vice Mayor: Marcelo J. Padilla
  - Representative: Joseph Santo Niño B. Bernos
  - Municipal Council: Members: Rodwin M. Bayongan; Barbero P. Wilson; Mary Joy S. Gascid; Estefan L. Lomioan; Ned Reinhard D. Quibayen; Oliver B. Bagayan; Marzon G. Riego; Nuely Q. Co Kue
  - Electorate: 1,454 voters (2025)

Area
  - Total: 114.37 km^{2} (44.16 sq mi)
- Elevation: 862 m (2,828 ft)
- Highest elevation: 1,889 m (6,198 ft)
- Lowest elevation: 388 m (1,273 ft)

Population (2024 census)
  - Total: 1,773
  - Density: 15.50/km^{2} (40.15/sq mi)
  - Households: 414

Economy
  - Income class: 4th municipal income class
  - Poverty incidence: 11.87% (2023)
  - Revenue: ₱ 125.3 million (2022)
  - Assets: ₱ 428.9 million (2022)
  - Expenditure: ₱ 66.81 million (2022)
  - Liabilities: ₱ 77.52 million (2022)

Service provider
  - Electricity: Abra Electric Cooperative (ABRECO)
- Time zone: UTC+8 (PST)
- ZIP code: 2816
- PSGC: 1400105000
- IDD : area code: +63 (0)74
- Native languages: Itneg, Ilocano, Filipino

Daguioman, officially the Municipality of Daguioman (Ilocano: Ili ti Daguioman; Filipino: Bayan ng Daguioman), is a municipality in the province of Abra, Philippines. According to the 2024 census, it has a population of 1,773 people. making it the least populated municipality in the province and the entire Cordillera Administrative Region.

== Geography ==
According to the Philippine Statistics Authority, the municipality has a land area of 114.37 square kilometres (44.16 sq mi) constituting 2.75% of the 4,165.25-square-kilometre- (1,608.21 sq mi) total area of Abra.

Daguioman is situated 65.81 kilometres (40.89 mi) from the provincial capital Bangued, and 438.50 kilometres (272.47 mi) from the country's capital city of Manila.

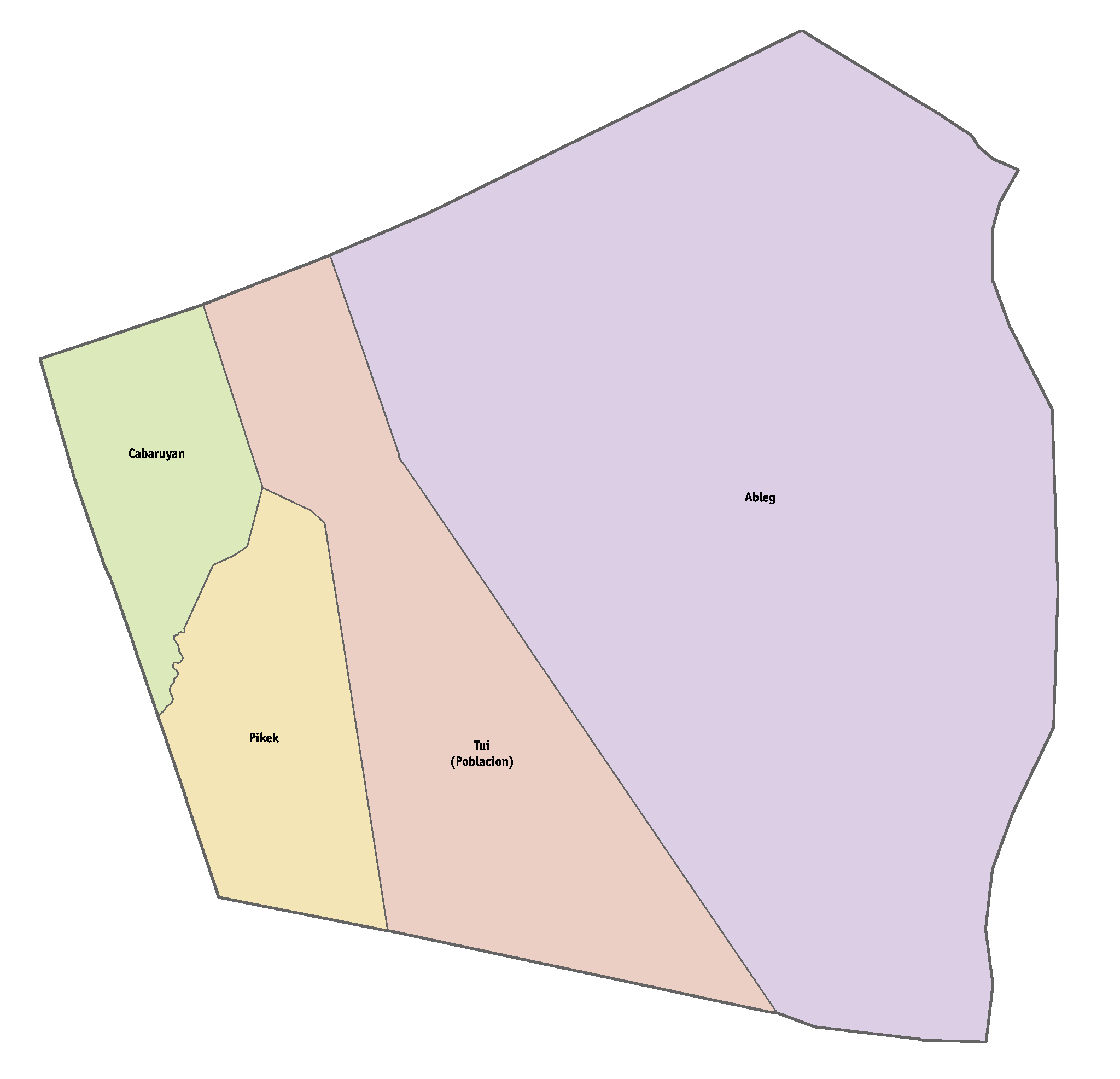
Political map of Daguioman

=== Barangays ===
Daguioman is politically subdivided into 4 barangays. Each barangay consists of puroks and some have sitios.

PSGC	Barangay	Population			±% p.a.	
		2024		2010		
140105001	Ableg	12.7%	226	175	▴	1.79%
140105002	Cabaruyan	27.2%	482	412	▴	1.09%
140105003	Pikek	21.4%	379	313	▴	1.33%
140105004	Tui (Poblacion)	52.6%	932	815	▴	0.93%
	Total		1,773	2,019	▾	−0.90%

=== Climate ===
Climate data for Daguioman, Abra
Month	Jan	Feb	Mar	Apr	May	Jun	Jul	Aug	Sep	Oct	Nov	Dec	Year
Mean daily maximum °C (°F)	25 (77)	26 (79)	28 (82)	30 (86)	29 (84)	29 (84)	28 (82)	28 (82)	28 (82)	27 (81)	27 (81)	25 (77)	28 (81)
Mean daily minimum °C (°F)	18 (64)	18 (64)	19 (66)	21 (70)	22 (72)	23 (73)	23 (73)	23 (73)	22 (72)	21 (70)	20 (68)	19 (66)	21 (69)
Average precipitation mm (inches)	23 (0.9)	28 (1.1)	33 (1.3)	64 (2.5)	232 (9.1)	242 (9.5)	258 (10.2)	266 (10.5)	245 (9.6)	201 (7.9)	87 (3.4)	69 (2.7)	1,748 (68.7)
Average rainy days	8.3	8.0	10.8	15.2	23.7	26.1	27.0	25.8	23.5	17.3	13.7	12.1	211.5
Source: Meteoblue (modeled/calculated data, not measured locally)

== Demographics ==
Population census of Daguioman
Year	Pop.	±% p.a.
1939	596	—
1948	666	+1.24%
1960	1,003	+3.47%
1970	1,050	+0.46%
1975	1,124	+1.38%
1980	1,254	+2.21%
1990	1,413	+1.20%
1995	1,475	+0.81%
2000	1,748	+3.71%
2007	1,916	+1.27%
2010	1,715	−3.95%
2015	2,088	+3.82%
2020	2,019	−0.70%
2024	1,773	−3.07%
Source: Philippine Statistics Authority

In the 2024 census, Daguioman had a population of 1,773 people. The population density was 16 inhabitants per square kilometre (41/sq mi). Daguioman is the home of the Banao tribe of Itneg.

== Economy ==
Poverty incidence of Daguioman (%)

Source: Philippine Statistics Authority

The economy of Daguioman is agriculture-based and rural. Because it is an upland, landlocked town nestled in the Cordillera mountain range, its economic activities are heavily dependent on natural resources, subsistence farming, and local government programs. The local government of Daguioman is also developing its local economy through sustainable tourism. The natural attractions of Daguioman include the Lumagat River View, Basakal Falls, and Daguioman Tourism Village.

== Government ==
=== Local government ===
Daguioman, belonging to the lone congressional district of the province of Abra, is governed by a mayor designated as its local chief executive and by a municipal council as its legislative body in accordance with the Local Government Code. The mayor, vice mayor, and the councilors are elected directly by the people through an election which is being held every three years.

=== Elected officials ===
Members of the Municipal Council (2025–2028)
Position	Name
Congressman	Joseph Santo Niño B. Bernos
Mayor	Salma Q. Padilla
Vice-Mayor	Marcelo J. Padilla
Councilors	Mary Joy S. Gascid
Councilors	Barbero P. Wilson
Councilors	Rodwin M. Bayongan
Councilors	Ned Reinhard D. Quibayen
Councilors	Estefan L. Lomioan
Councilors	Oliver B. Bagayan
Councilors	Nuely Q. Co Kue
Councilors	Marzon G. Riego

== Education ==
The Daguioman Schools District Office governs all educational institutions within the municipality. It oversees the management and operations of public schools, from primary to elementary schools.

=== Primary and elementary schools ===
- Cabaruyan Elementary School
- Daguioman Central School
- Pikek Primary School
