= Bucloc =

Municipality in Abra, Philippines

- Municipality
- Municipality of Bucloc
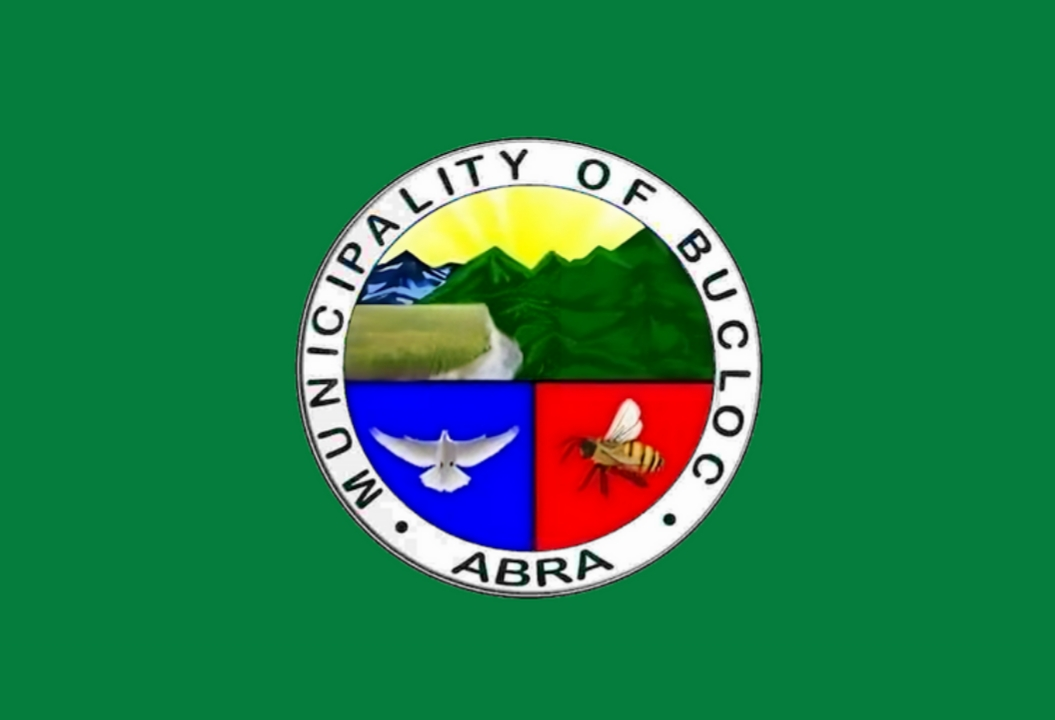
- Flag Seal

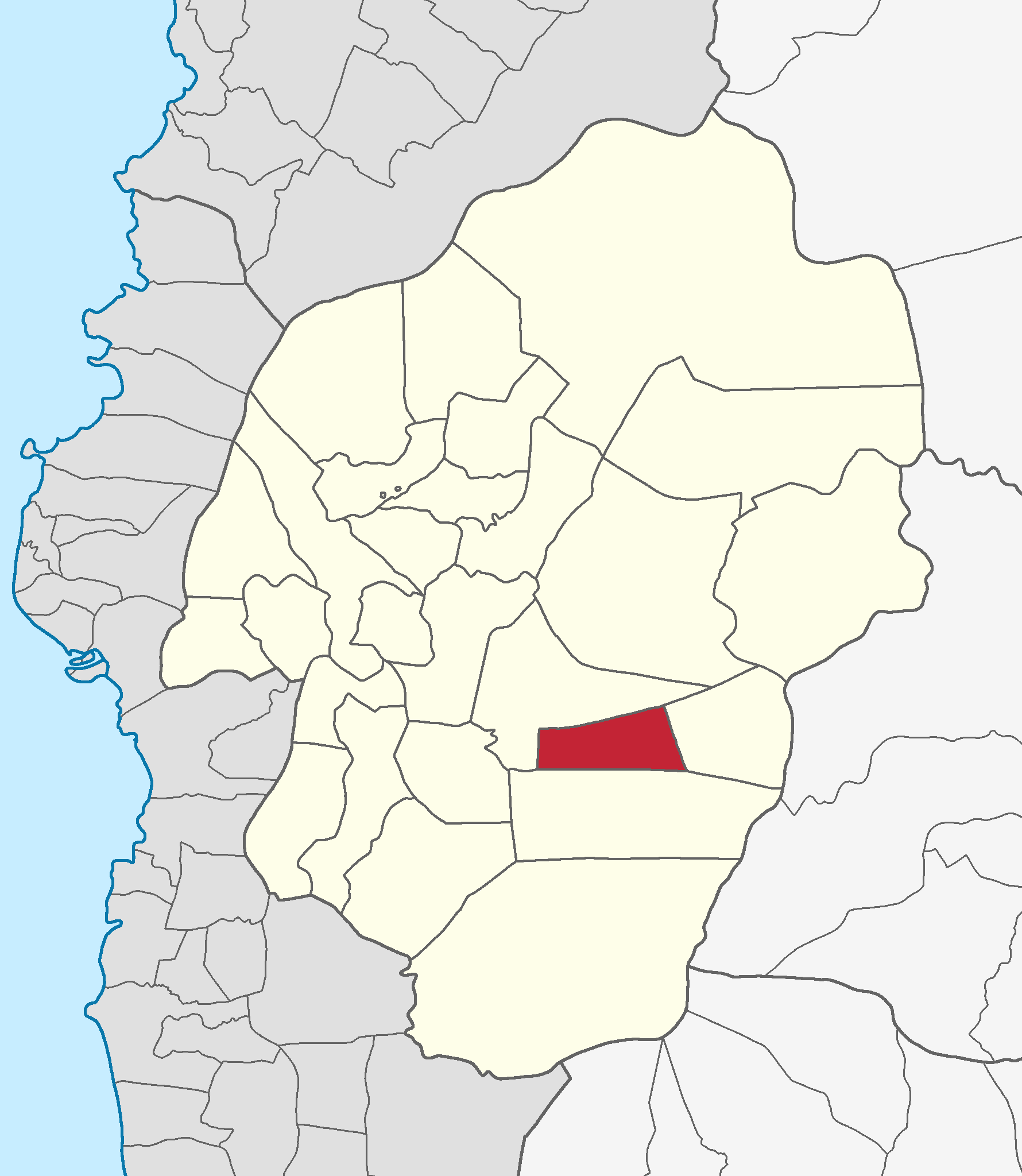
- Map of Abra with Bucloc highlighted
- Interactive map of Bucloc
- Location within the Philippines
- Coordinates: 17°26′N 120°52′E
- Country: Philippines
- Region: Cordillera Administrative Region
- Province: Abra
- District: Lone district
- Barangays: 4 (see Barangays)

Government
  - Type: Sangguniang Bayan
  - Mayor: Alvinder B. Cardenas
  - Vice Mayor: Ruby H. Cillo
  - Representative: Joseph Santo Niño B. Bernos
  - Municipal Council: Members: Romel L. Bayongan; Ailyn P. Padua; Marlon B. Bagioan; Dindo B. Latawan; Willy B. Bayongan; Pablito M. Hermoso Jr.; Dennis P. Cariño; Freddie B. Campol
  - Electorate: 2,064 voters (2025)

Area
  - Total: 63.77 km^{2} (24.62 sq mi)
- Elevation: 601 m (1,972 ft)
- Highest elevation: 1,178 m (3,865 ft)
- Lowest elevation: 282 m (925 ft)

Population (2024 census)
  - Total: 2,264
  - Density: 35.50/km^{2} (91.95/sq mi)
  - Households: 480

Economy
  - Income class: 4th municipal income class
  - Poverty incidence: 11.97% (2023)
  - Revenue: ₱ 26.51 million (2012), 28.74 million (2013), 28.76 million (2014), 38.61 million (2015), 44.07 million (2016), 66.98 million (2017), 44.05 million (2018), 31.09 million (2011)
  - Assets: ₱ 25.05 million (2012), 22.45 million (2013), 28.55 million (2014), 50.49 million (2015), 91.13 million (2016), 141.5 million (2017), 191.9 million (2018), 19.67 million (2011)
  - Expenditure: ₱ 30.75 million (2012), 26.88 million (2013), 23.29 million (2014), 26.84 million (2015), 28.61 million (2016), 32.56 million (2017), 40.16 million (2018), 23.36 million (2011)
  - Liabilities: ₱ 2.521 million (2012), 8.326 million (2013), 12.8 million (2014), 28.41 million (2015), 40.38 million (2016), 56.32 million (2017), 103.9 million (2018), 2.731 million (2011)

Service provider
  - Electricity: Abra Electric Cooperative (ABRECO)
- Time zone: UTC+8 (PST)
- ZIP code: 2817
- PSGC: 1400104000
- IDD : area code: +63 (0)74
- Native languages: Itneg, Ilocano, Filipino

Bucloc, officially the Municipality of Bucloc (Ilocano: Ili ti Bucloc; Filipino: Bayan ng Bucloc), is a municipality in the province of Abra, Philippines. According to the 2024 census, it has a population of 2,264 people.

== Geography ==
According to the Philippine Statistics Authority, the municipality has a land area of 63.77 square kilometres (24.62 sq mi) constituting 1.53% of the 4,165.25-square-kilometre- (1,608.21 sq mi) total area of Abra.

Bucloc is situated 56.63 kilometres (35.19 mi) from the provincial capital Bangued, and 429.33 kilometres (266.77 mi) from the country's capital city of Manila.

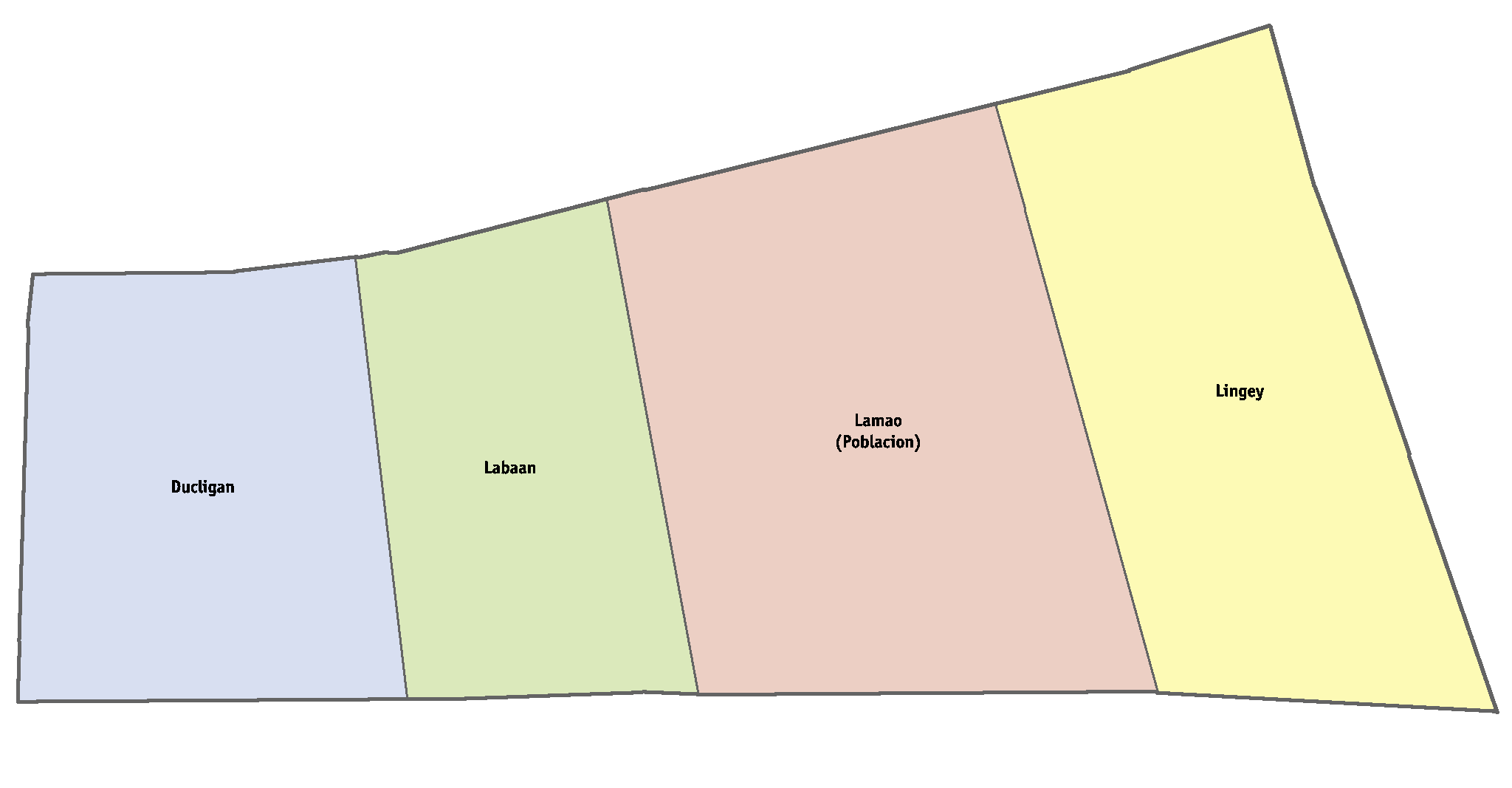
Political map of Bucloc

=== Barangays ===
Bucloc is politically subdivided into 4 barangays. Each barangay consists of puroks and some have sitios.

PSGC	Barangay	Population			±% p.a.	
		2024		2010		
140104001	Ducligan	24.7%	559	437	▴	1.72%
140104002	Labaan	28.4%	644	587	▴	0.64%
140104004	Lamao (Poblacion)	22.2%	502	546	▾	−0.58%
140104003	Lingey	30.5%	690	606	▴	0.90%
	Total		2,264	2,395	▾	−0.39%

=== Climate ===
Climate data for Bucloc, Abra
Month	Jan	Feb	Mar	Apr	May	Jun	Jul	Aug	Sep	Oct	Nov	Dec	Year
Mean daily maximum °C (°F)	26 (79)	27 (81)	29 (84)	31 (88)	30 (86)	29 (84)	29 (84)	28 (82)	29 (84)	28 (82)	27 (81)	26 (79)	28 (83)
Mean daily minimum °C (°F)	18 (64)	19 (66)	20 (68)	22 (72)	23 (73)	23 (73)	23 (73)	23 (73)	23 (73)	21 (70)	21 (70)	20 (68)	21 (70)
Average precipitation mm (inches)	23 (0.9)	28 (1.1)	33 (1.3)	64 (2.5)	232 (9.1)	242 (9.5)	258 (10.2)	266 (10.5)	245 (9.6)	201 (7.9)	87 (3.4)	69 (2.7)	1,748 (68.7)
Average rainy days	8.3	8.0	10.8	15.2	23.7	26.1	27.0	25.8	23.5	17.3	13.7	12.1	211.5
Source: Meteoblue

== Demographics ==
Population census of Bucloc
Year	Pop.	±% p.a.
1939	719	—
1948	827	+1.57%
1960	1,152	+2.80%
1970	1,401	+1.97%
1975	1,447	+0.65%
1980	1,605	+2.09%
1990	1,932	+1.87%
1995	1,919	−0.13%
2000	2,109	+2.04%
2007	2,227	+0.75%
2010	2,176	−0.84%
2015	2,501	+2.69%
2020	2,395	−0.91%
2024	2,264	−1.34%
Source: Philippine Statistics Authority

In the 2024 census, Bucloc had a population of 2,264 people. The population density was 36 inhabitants per square kilometre (93/sq mi).

== Economy ==
Poverty incidence of Bucloc (%)

Source: Philippine Statistics Authority

The economy of Bucloc is agriculture-based, rural, and dependent on public sector funding. Bucloc operates as a lower-income class municipality with a developing local economy driven by small-scale farming and forest resources.

== Government ==
=== Local government ===
Bucloc, belonging to the lone congressional district of the province of Abra, is governed by a mayor designated as its local chief executive and by a municipal council as its legislative body in accordance with the Local Government Code. The mayor, vice mayor, and the councilors are elected directly by the people through an election which is being held every three years.

=== Elected officials ===
Members of the Municipal Council (2025–2028)
Position	Name
Congressman	Joseph Santo Niño B. Bernos
Mayor	Alvinder B. Cardenas
Vice-Mayor	Ruby H. Cillo
Councilors	Marlon B. Bagioan
Councilors	Romel L. Bayongan
Councilors	Dindo B. Latawan
Councilors	Ailyn P. Padua
Councilors	Dennis P. Cariño
Councilors	Willy B. Bayongan
Councilors	Freddie B. Campol
Councilors	Pablito M. Hermoso, Jr.

== Education ==
The Bucloc Schools District Office governs all educational institutions within the municipality. It oversees the management and operations of all private and public, from primary to secondary schools.

=== Primary and elementary schools ===
- Bucloc Central School
- Daldalao Elementary School
- Ducligan Elementary School
- Lingey Elementary School

=== Secondary school ===
- Abra Mt. Development Educational Center
