= Legislative districts of Abra =

Legislative district of the Philippines

The legislative districts of Abra are the representations of the province of Abra in the various national legislatures of the Philippines. The province is currently represented in the lower house of the Congress of the Philippines through its lone congressional district.

== History ==
Abra was initially represented in 1907 as part of the third assembly district of Ilocos Sur, having been annexed to the latter as a sub-province in 1905. Following its re-establishment as a regular province on March 9, 1917, through Act No. 2683, Abra was granted its separate representation; its first representative was elected in 1919. When seats for the upper house of the Philippine Legislature were elected from territory-based districts between 1916 and 1935, the province formed part of the first senatorial district which elected two out of the 24-member senate.

In the disruption caused by World War II, two delegates represented the province in the National Assembly of the Japanese-sponsored Second Philippine Republic: one was the provincial governor (an ex officio member), while the other was elected through a provincial assembly of KALIBAPI members during the Japanese occupation of the Philippines. Upon the restoration of the Commonwealth of the Philippines in 1945, the province continued to comprise a lone district.

Abra was represented in the Interim Batasang Pambansa as part of Region I from 1978 to 1984, and elected one representative to the Regular Batasang Pambansa in 1984. The province retained its lone congressional district under the new Constitution which was proclaimed on February 11, 1987, and elected its member to the restored House of Representatives starting that same year.

== Senatorial representation ==
Between 1916 and 1935, Abra was represented in the Senate of the Philippines through the 1st senatorial district of the Philippine Islands. However, in 1935, all senatorial districts were abolished when a unicameral National Assembly was installed under a new constitution following the passage of the Tydings–McDuffie Act, which established the Commonwealth of the Philippines. Since the 1941 elections, when the Senate was restored after a constitutional plebiscite, all twenty-four members of the upper house have been elected countrywide at-large.

== Congressional representation ==
Abra has been represented in the lower house of various Philippine national legislatures since 1898, through its at-large congressional district.

Legislative Districts and Congressional Representatives of Abra
District	Current Representative	Party	Population (2020)	Area
Lone	Joseph Sto. Niño B. Bernos (since 2025); La Paz	NUP	250,985	4,165.25 km^{2}

== Provincial board districts ==
The municipalities of Abra are represented in the Abra Provincial Board, the Sangguniang Panlalawigan (provincial legislature) of the province, through Abra's first and second provincial board districts.

== See also ==
- Legislative districts of Ilocos Sur
