= San Juan, Abra =

Municipality in Abra, Philippines

San Juan
- Municipality
- Municipality of San Juan
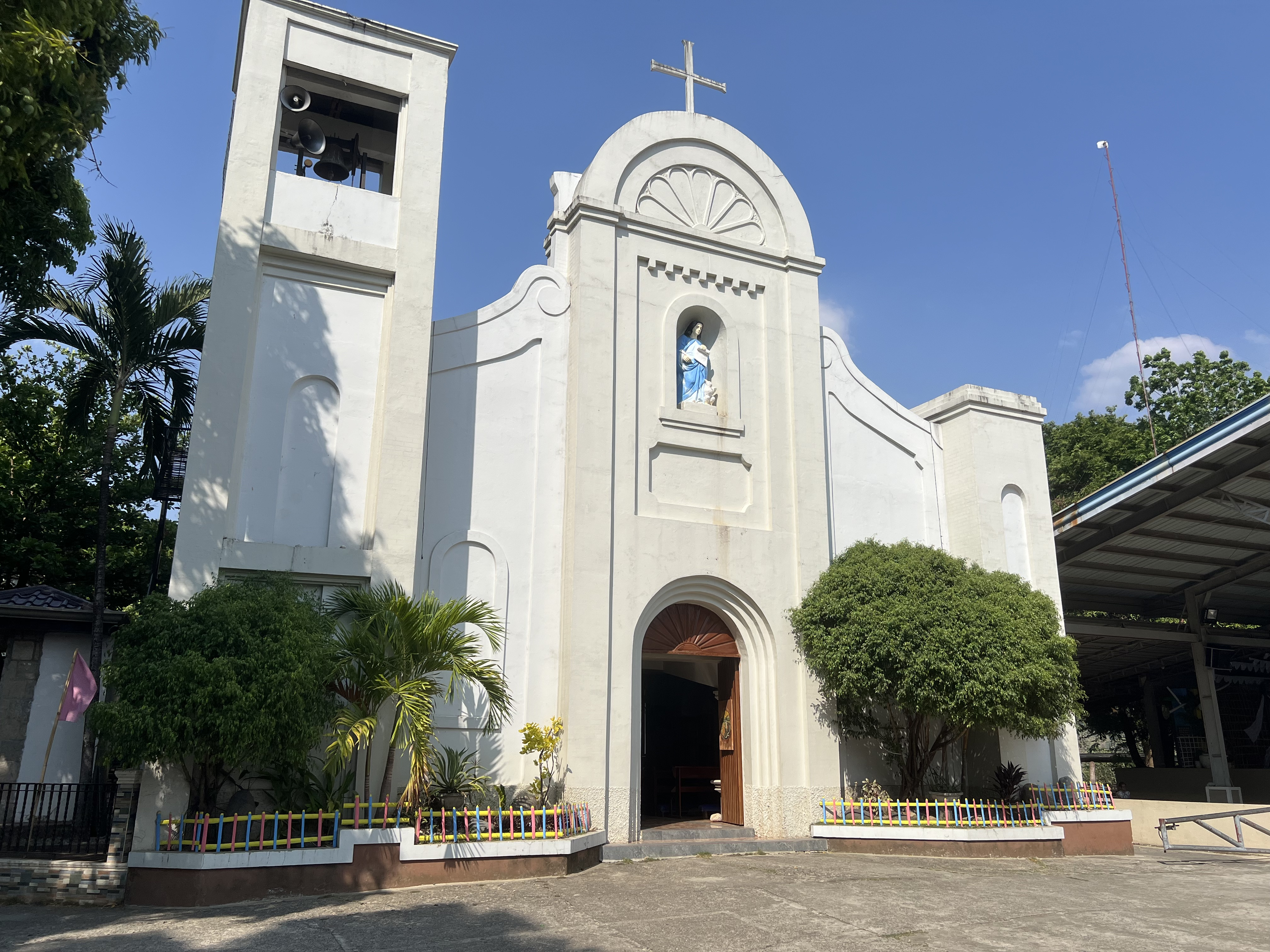
- St. John the Evangelist Parish Church

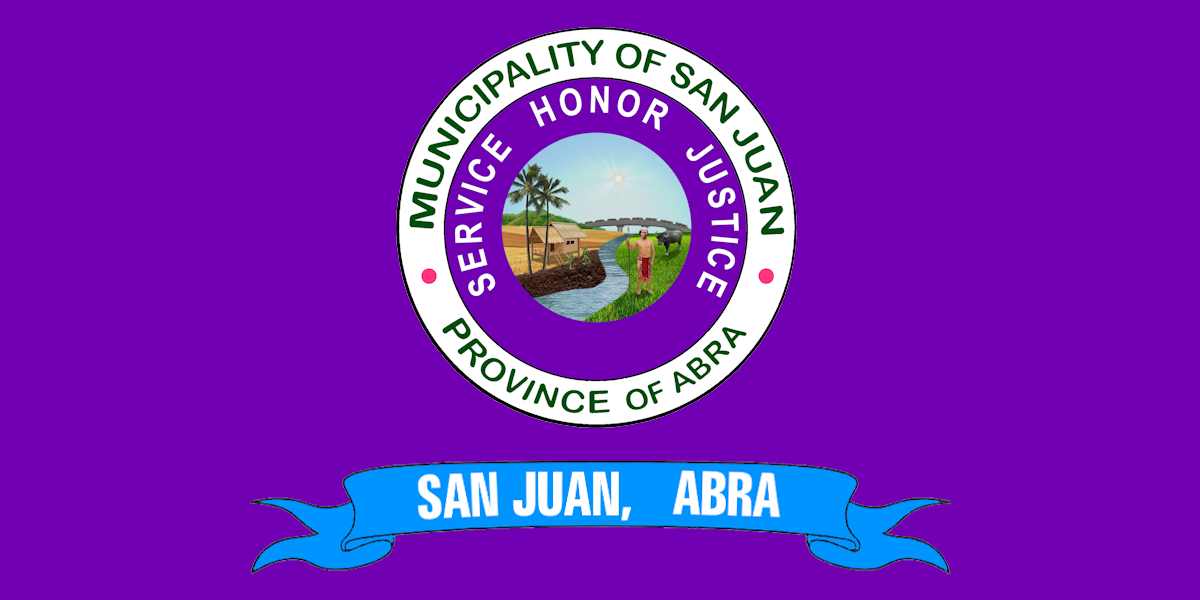
- Flag

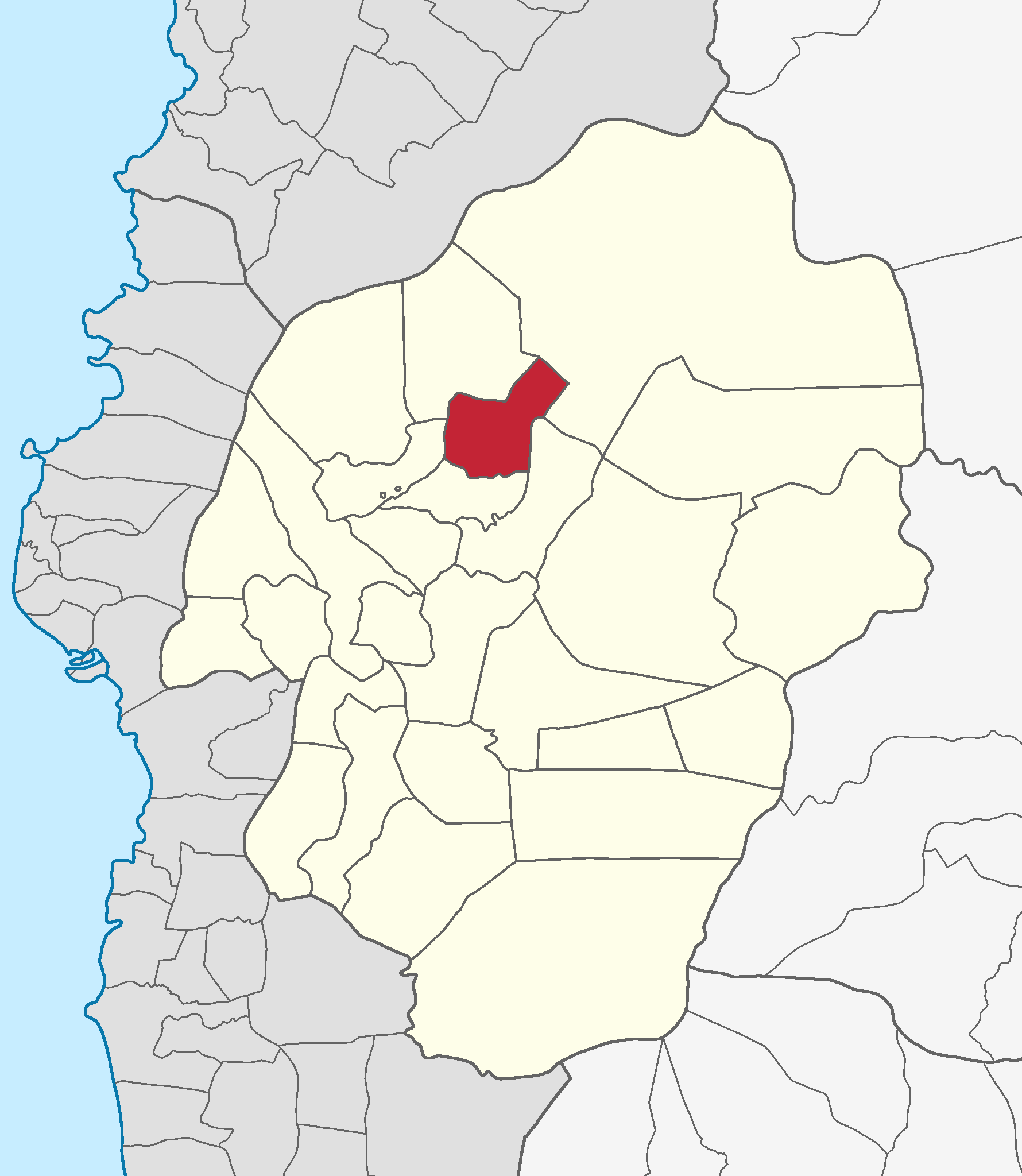
- Map of Abra with San Juan highlighted
- Interactive map of San Juan
- Location within the Philippines
- Coordinates: 17°41′N 120°44′E
- Country: Philippines
- Region: Cordillera Administrative Region
- Province: Abra
- District: Lone district
- Founded: February 28, 1929
- Barangays: 19 (see Barangays)

Government
  - Type: Sangguniang Bayan
  - Mayor: Ari Lucas B. Bautista
  - Vice Mayor: Meynardo M. Bautista Jr.
  - Representative: Joseph Santo Niño B. Bernos
  - Municipal Council: Members: Merwida L. Bautista; Jaime C. Bose; Rolando B. Burgos; Ephraim B. Bosque; Apollo M. Bernardino; Diosdado B. Taverner; Jonathan B. Tagudar; Manasseh T. Dickson
  - Electorate: 7,750 voters (2025)

Area
  - Total: 64.08 km^{2} (24.74 sq mi)
- Elevation: 139 m (456 ft)
- Highest elevation: 421 m (1,381 ft)
- Lowest elevation: 52 m (171 ft)

Population (2024 census)
  - Total: 10,777
  - Density: 168.2/km^{2} (435.6/sq mi)
  - Households: 2,525

Economy
  - Income class: 4th municipal income class
  - Poverty incidence: 15.65% (2023)
  - Revenue: ₱ 131.6 million (2024)
  - Assets: ₱ 491.3 million (2024)
  - Expenditure: ₱ 97.34 million (2024)
  - Liabilities: ₱ 27.2 million (2024)

Service provider
  - Electricity: Abra Electric Cooperative (ABRECO)
- Time zone: UTC+8 (PST)
- ZIP code: 2823
- PSGC: 1400122000
- IDD : area code: +63 (0)74
- Native languages: Itneg; Ilocano; Tagalog

San Juan, officially the Municipality of San Juan (Ilocano: Ili ti San Juan; Inlaod Itneg: Ili ta San Juan; Adasen: Ili nga San Juan; Tagalog: Bayan ng San Juan), is a municipality in the province of Abra, Philippines. According to the 2024 census, it has a population of 10,777 people.

== History ==
The present-day town of San Juan was once inhabited by Tinguians, belonging to the Inlaud Tribe. Before the Spanish colonial era, the natives were believed to have traded with the Indo-Chinese. They were believed to have bartered with them as evidenced by the presence of antique jars, big bowls, gongs, arrows and shields, beads, jewel and gems.

During the Spanish colonial era, a church was established and many of the people got baptized as Christians. The Spanish named the place San Juan.

From 1907 to 1929, San Juan was a barrio of Dolores. By virtue of a Philippine Legislature bill sponsored by Abra's then-Representative Quintín Paredes and through the initiative of Dolores's then-Vice Mayor Manuel Magala, San Juan became a separate municipality. The new municipality was inaugurated on February 28, 1929.

In the early hours of March 16, 1988, around 120 members of the New People's Army raided and burned down the town's municipal hall, though after four hours of fighting the responding government troopers were able to retake the establishment.

== Geography ==
The Municipality of San Juan is located at 17°41′N 120°44′E. According to the Philippine Statistics Authority, the municipality has a land area of 64.08 square kilometres (24.74 sq mi) constituting 1.54% of the 4,165.25-square-kilometre- (1,608.21 sq mi) total area of Abra.

San Juan is situated 22.64 kilometres (14.07 mi) from the provincial capital Bangued, and 428.49 kilometres (266.25 mi) from the country's capital city of Manila.

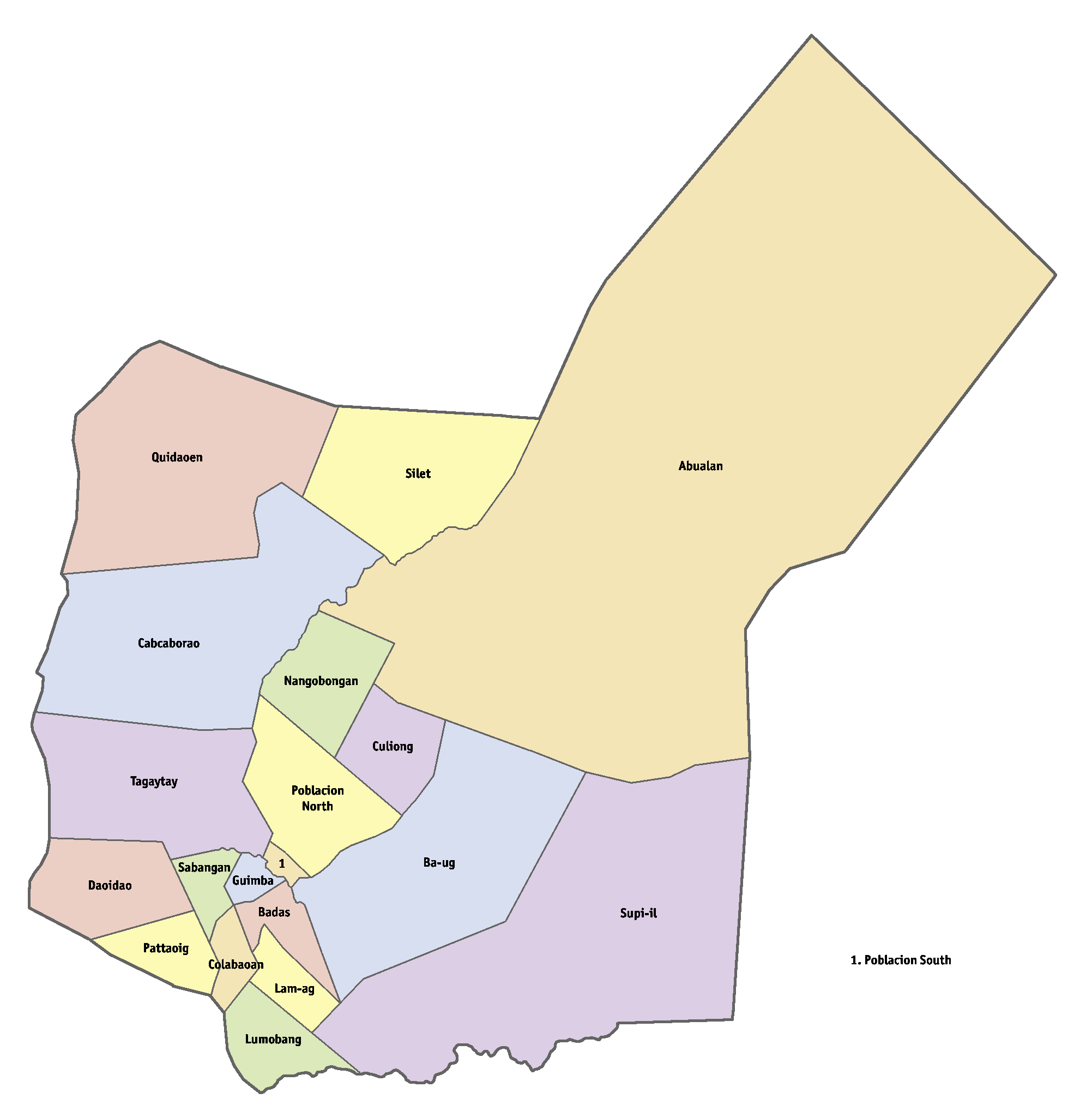
Political map of San Juan

=== Barangays ===
San Juan is politically subdivided into 19 barangays. Each barangay consists of puroks and some have sitios.

PSGC	Barangay	Population			±% p.a.	
		2024		2010		
140122001	Abualan	6.6%	716	885	▾	−1.46%
140122002	Badas	4.2%	449	463	▾	−0.21%
140122003	Ba-ug	11.2%	1,210	1,104	▴	0.64%
140122004	Cabcaborao	9.7%	1,047	1,032	▴	0.10%
140122005	Colabaoan	2.5%	273	295	▾	−0.54%
140122006	Culiong	4.1%	437	483	▾	−0.69%
140122007	Daoidao	1.6%	177	152	▴	1.06%
140122008	Guimba	3.5%	372	369	▴	0.06%
140122009	Lam-ag	5.6%	607	546	▴	0.74%
140122010	Lumobang	3.9%	420	363	▴	1.02%
140122011	Nangobongan	4.4%	475	393	▴	1.32%
140122012	Pattaoig	1.0%	111	122	▾	−0.65%
140122013	Poblacion North	8.2%	888	980	▾	−0.68%
140122014	Poblacion South	3.7%	400	542	▾	−2.08%
140122015	Quidaoen	7.5%	803	679	▴	1.17%
140122016	Sabangan	3.5%	372	244	▴	2.96%
140122017	Silet	4.6%	493	495	▾	−0.03%
140122018	Supi-il	7.3%	792	680	▴	1.06%
140122019	Tagaytay	6.0%	646	719	▾	−0.74%
	Total		10,777	10,688	▴	0.06%

=== Climate ===
The climate in San Juan is characterized by two distinct seasons. The dry season, which occurs from November to April, is marked by daily blue skies and clear starry nights. The wet season for the rest of the year is characterized with high rainfall intensities accompanied by storms and typhoons.

Climate data for San Juan, Abra
Month	Jan	Feb	Mar	Apr	May	Jun	Jul	Aug	Sep	Oct	Nov	Dec	Year
Mean daily maximum °C (°F)	27 (81)	28 (82)	30 (86)	32 (90)	31 (88)	31 (88)	30 (86)	30 (86)	30 (86)	29 (84)	28 (82)	27 (81)	29 (85)
Mean daily minimum °C (°F)	19 (66)	19 (66)	21 (70)	23 (73)	24 (75)	25 (77)	24 (75)	24 (75)	24 (75)	22 (72)	21 (70)	20 (68)	22 (72)
Average precipitation mm (inches)	24 (0.9)	26 (1.0)	25 (1.0)	43 (1.7)	159 (6.3)	180 (7.1)	204 (8.0)	207 (8.1)	183 (7.2)	185 (7.3)	91 (3.6)	67 (2.6)	1,394 (54.8)
Average rainy days	8.2	8.7	10.1	13.7	22.3	24.3	25.3	23.5	22.2	16.4	14.1	12.7	201.5
Source: Meteoblue

== Demographics ==
Population census of San Juan
Year	Pop.	±% p.a.
1903	2,192	—
1939	3,842	+1.57%
1948	4,603	+2.03%
1960	5,400	+1.34%
1970	6,833	+2.38%
1975	6,989	+0.45%
1980	7,233	+0.69%
1990	8,445	+1.56%
1995	8,461	+0.04%
2000	8,821	+0.90%
2007	9,714	+1.34%
2010	10,546	+3.04%
2015	9,867	−1.26%
2020	10,688	+1.70%
2024	10,777	+0.20%
Source: Philippine Statistics Authority

In the 2024 census, San Juan had a population of 10,777 people. The population density was 170 inhabitants per square kilometre (440/sq mi).

== Economy ==
Poverty incidence of San Juan (%)

Source: Philippine Statistics Authority

=== Agriculture ===
San Juan is an agricultural town. Its major products are rice, corn and tobacco. The town has two major rivers: the Malanas River and Tineg River. These two rivers supply the townspeople with fish and they are also used to transport bamboo which is sold to resort owners in Vigan.

During the dry season, the townsfolk also plant string beans, eggplant, peanuts, bitter gourds, squashes, okra, and tomatoes. Some also cultivate mangoes.

== Government ==
=== Local government ===
San Juan, belonging to the lone congressional district of the province of Abra, is governed by a mayor designated as its local chief executive and by a municipal council as its legislative body in accordance with the Local Government Code. The mayor, vice mayor, and the councilors are elected directly by the people through an election which is being held every three years.

=== Elected officials ===
Members of the Municipal Council (2025–2028)
Position	Name
Congressman	Joseph Santo Niño B. Bernos
Mayor	Ari Lucas B. Bautista
Vice-Mayor	Meynardo M. Bautista Jr.
Councilors	Merwida L. Bautista
Councilors	Apollo M. Bernardino
Councilors	Jaime C. Bose
Councilors	Ephraim B. Bosque
Councilors	Diosdado B. Taverner
Councilors	Rolando B. Burgos
Councilors	Jonathan B. Tagudar
Councilors	Manasseh T. Dickson

== Education ==
The San Juan Schools District Office governs all educational institutions within the municipality. It oversees the management and operations of all private and public, from primary to secondary schools.

=== Primary and elementary schools ===
- Alimosgan Elementary School
- Baug Primary School
- Cabcaburao Elementary School
- Colabaoan Primary School
- Daoidao Elementary School
- Lam-Ag Elementary School
- Nangobongan Primary School
- Quidaoen Elementary School
- San Juan Central School
- Silet Elementary School
- Supiil Elementary School

=== Secondary schools ===
- Northern Abra National High School
- Quidaoen National High School
- Saint John High School, Inc.
