= Abra (province) =

Province in Cordillera, Philippines

- Province
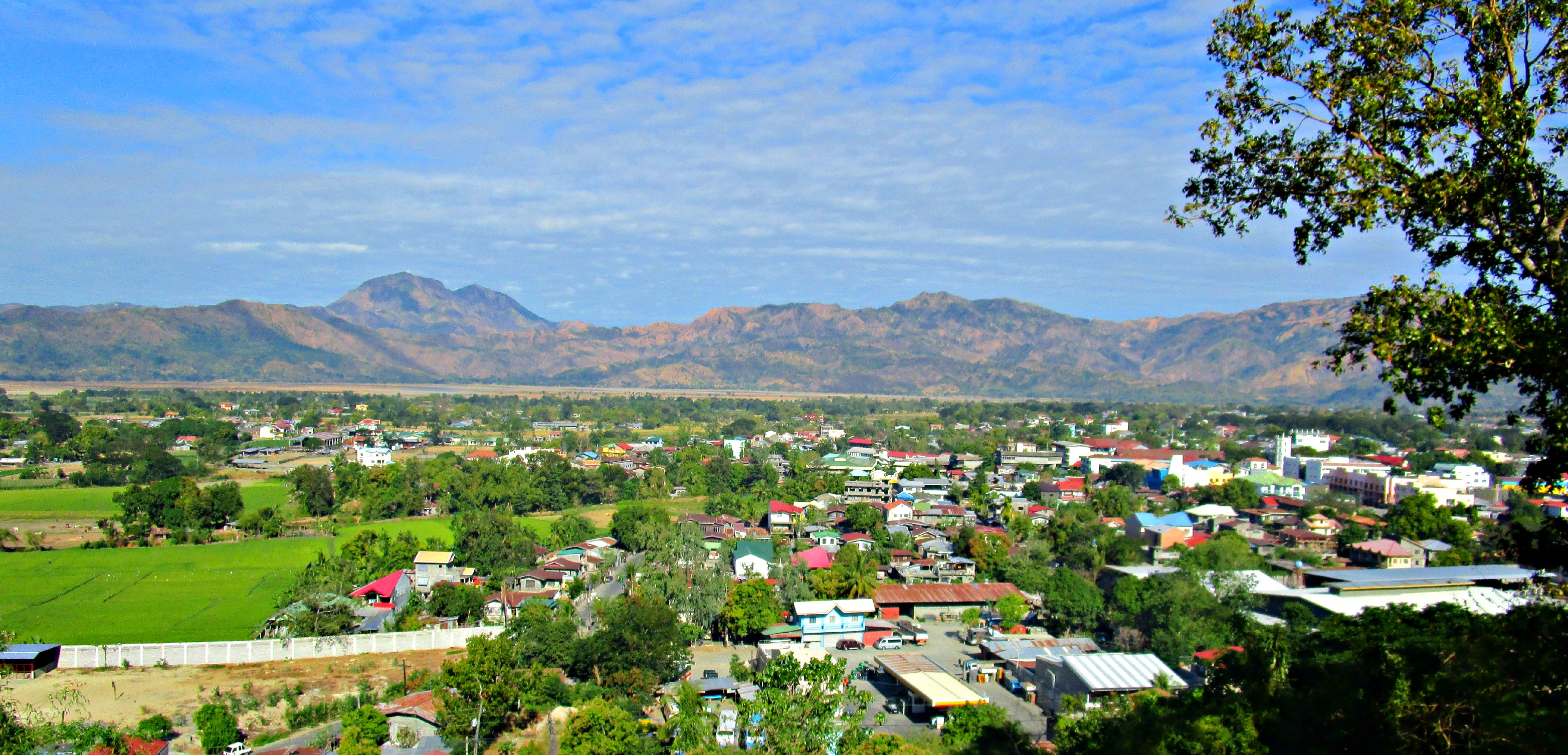
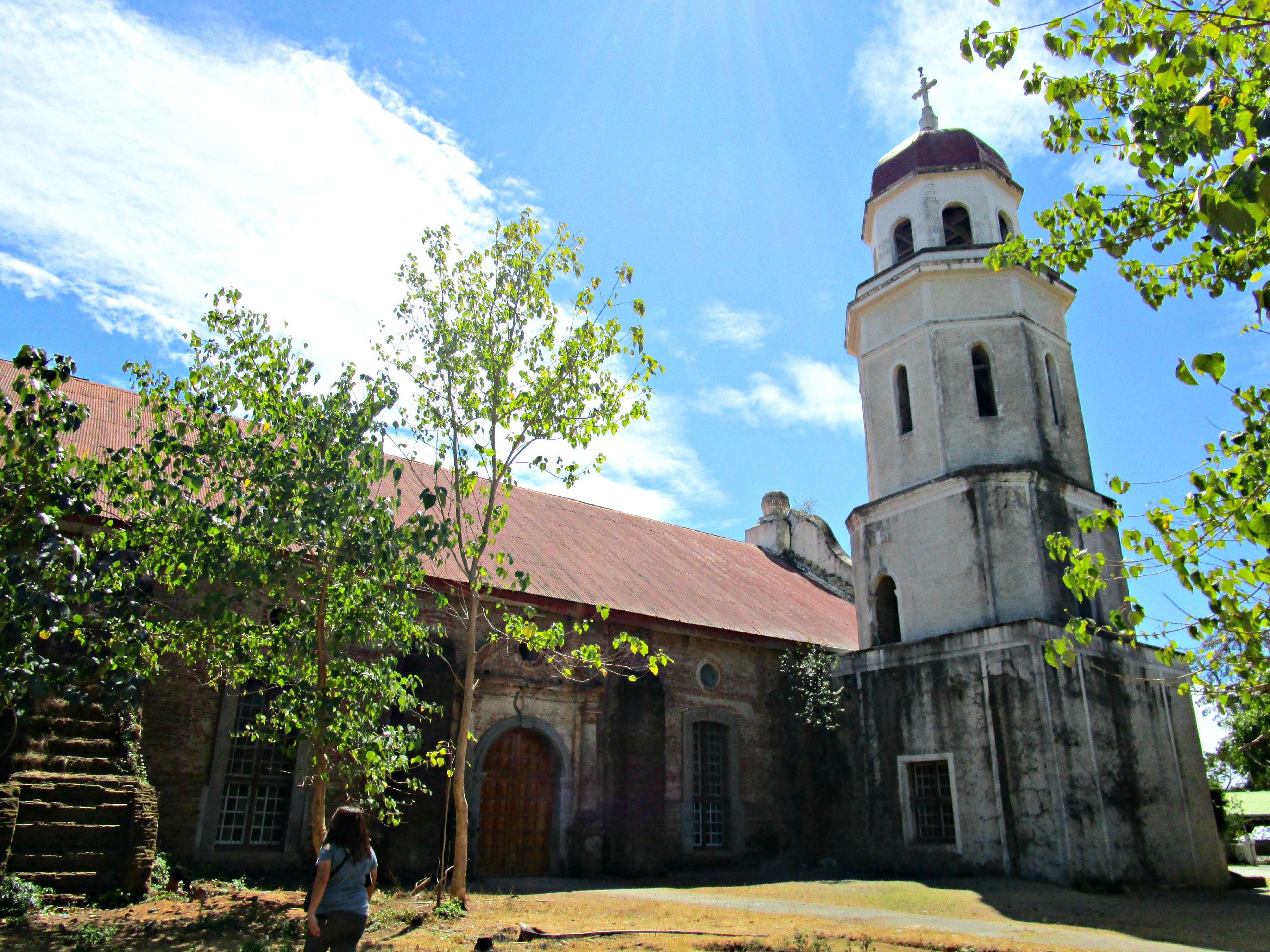
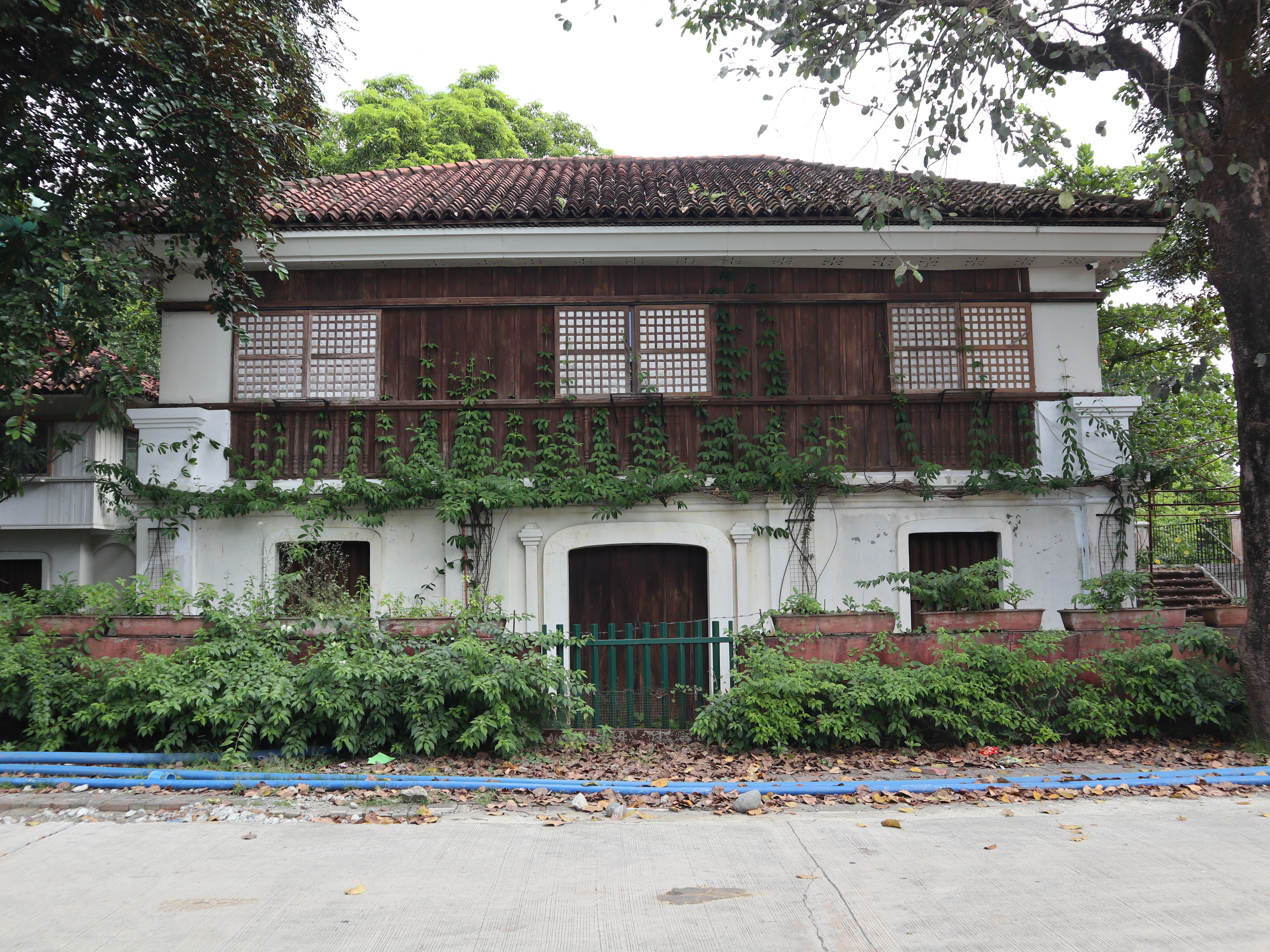
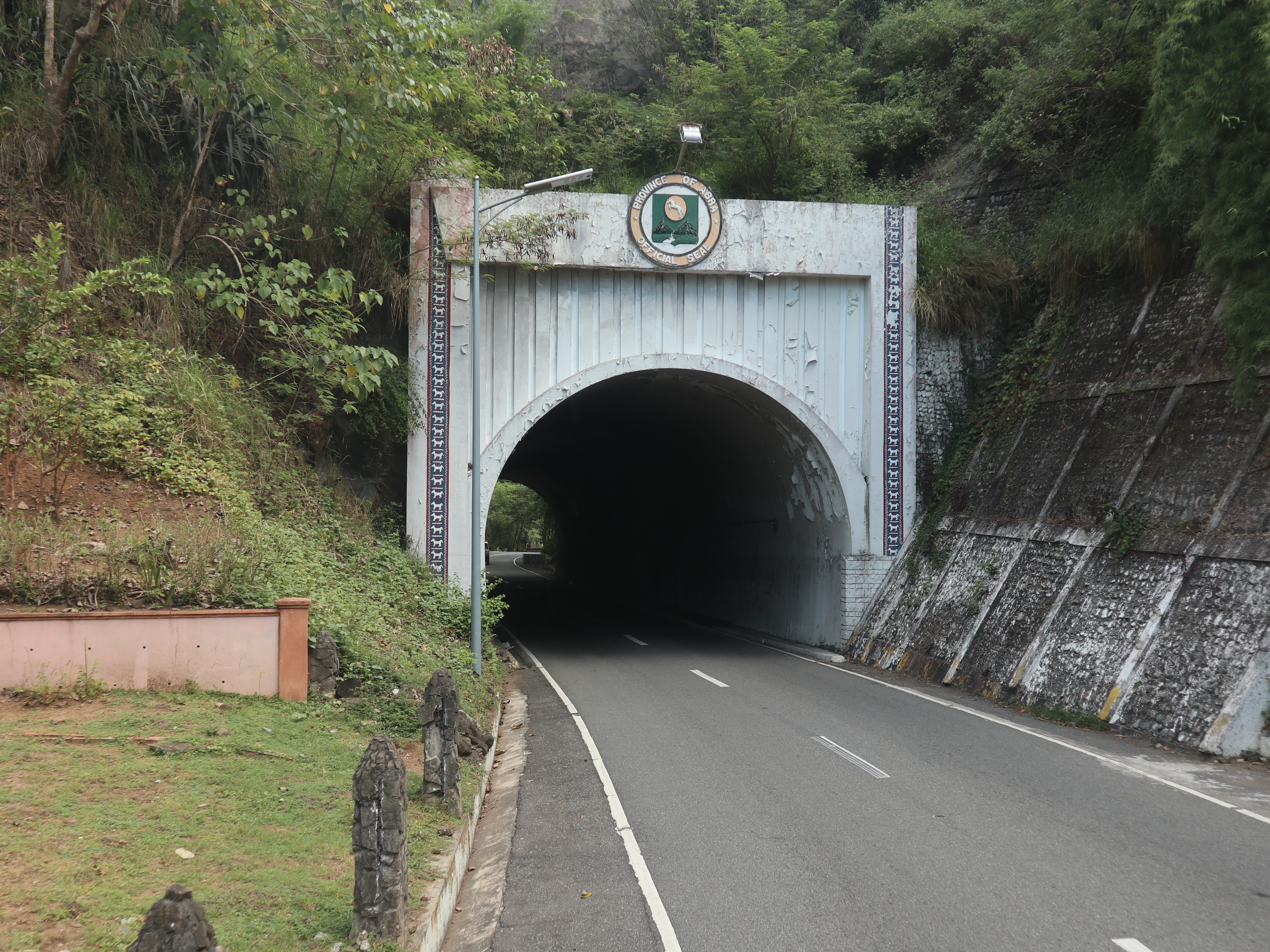
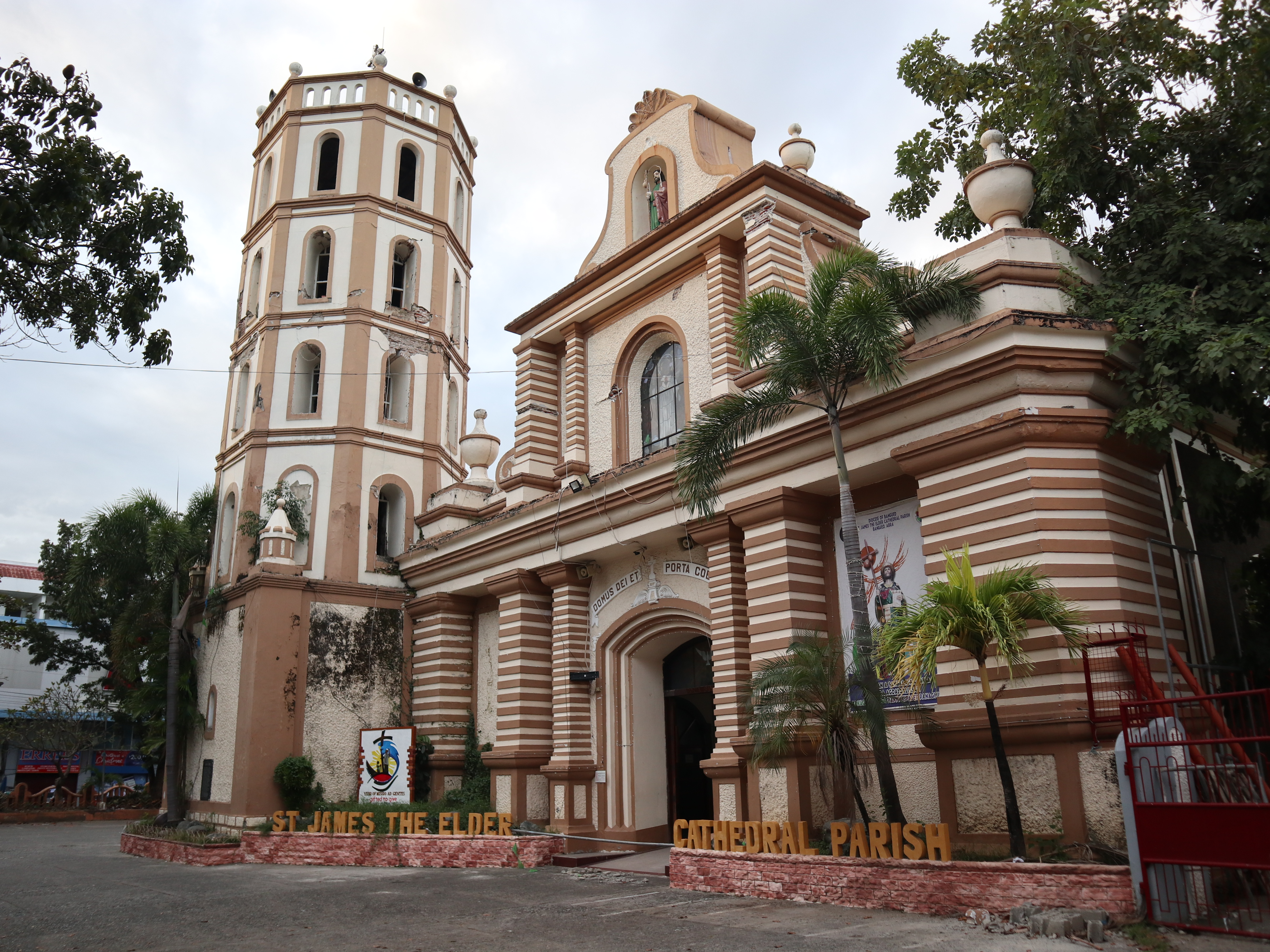
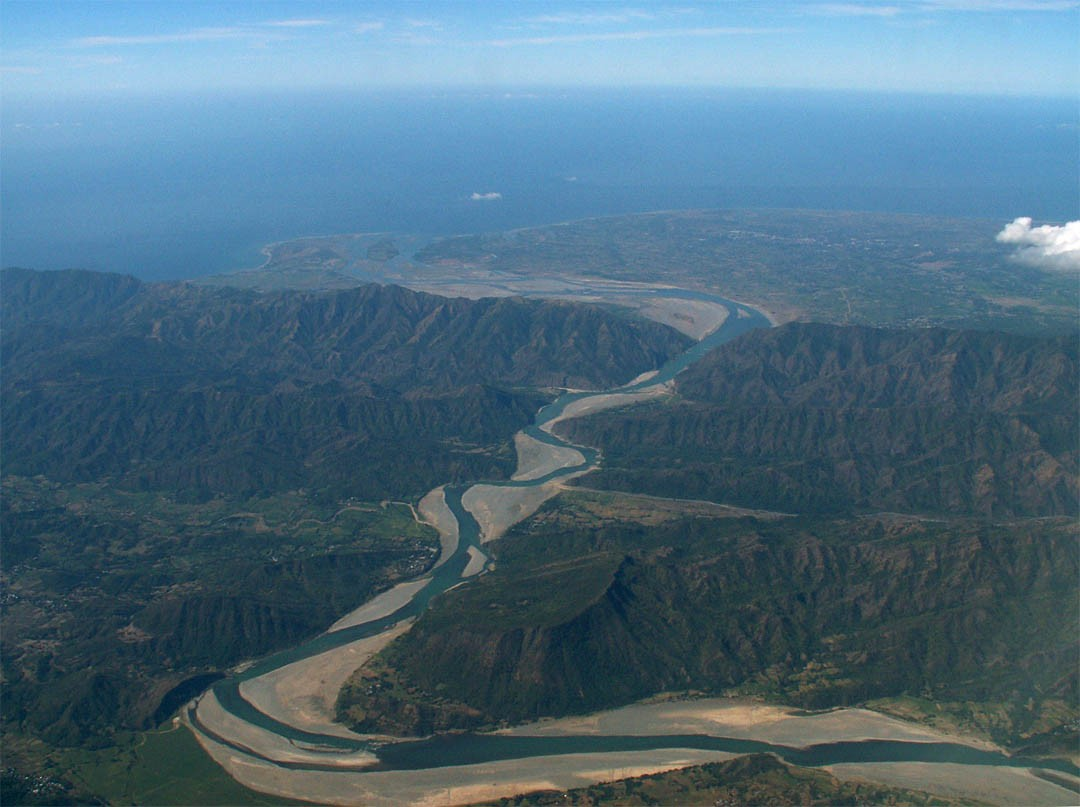
- (from top: left to right) Bangued skyline from Cassamata Hill, Tayum Church, Flores Ancestral House, Tangadan Tunnel, Saint James the Elder Parish and Abra River.

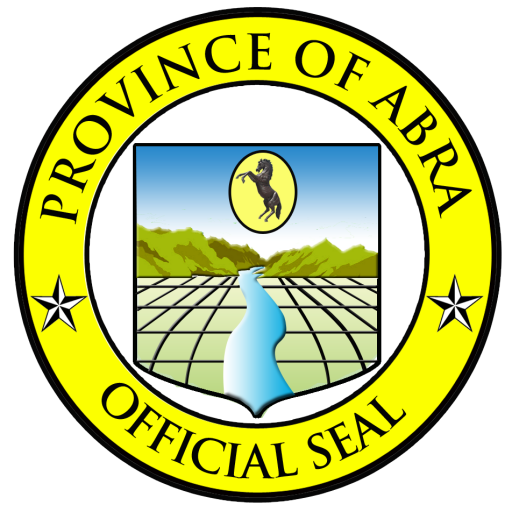
- Flag Seal

- Location in the Philippines
- Interactive map of Abra
- Coordinates: 17°35′N 120°47′E
- Country: Philippines
- Region: Cordillera Administrative Region
- Founded: March 10, 1917
- Capital and largest municipality: Bangued

Government
  - Governor: Eustaquio P. Bersamin (PFP)
  - Vice Governor: Ana Marie A. Bersamin (PFP)
  - Representative: Joseph Bernos
  - Legislature: Abra Provincial Board
  - Electorate: 188,957 voters (2025)

Area
  - Total: 4,165.25 km^{2} (1,608.21 sq mi)
  - Rank: 29th out of 82
- Highest elevation (Mt.Bangbanglang): 2,467 m (8,094 ft)

Population (2024 census)
  - Total: 246,948
  - Rank: 68th out of 82
  - Density: 59.2877/km^{2} (153.554/sq mi)
  - Rank: 80th out of 82
  - Households: 58,956
- Demonyms: Abreño; Abrenian

Divisions
  - Independent cities: 0
  - Component cities: 0
  - Municipalities: 27: Bangued; Boliney; Bucay; Bucloc; Daguioman; Danglas; Dolores; La Paz; Lacub; Lagangilang; Lagayan; Langiden; Licuan-Baay; Luba; Malibcong; Manabo; Peñarrubia; Pidigan; Pilar; Sallapadan; San Isidro; San Juan; San Quintin; Tayum; Tineg; Tubo; Villaviciosa
  - Barangays: 303
  - Districts: Legislative districts of Abra

Economy
  - Income class: 1st provincial income class
  - Poverty incidence: 9.4% (2023)
  - Revenue: ₱ 3,131 million (2022)
  - Assets: ₱ 11,677 million (2022)
  - Expenditure: ₱ 1,316 million (2022)
  - Liabilities: ₱ 1,536 million (2022)
- Time zone: UTC+8 (PHT)
- PSGC: 140100000
- IDD : area code: +63 (0)74
- ISO 3166 code: PH-ABR
- Spoken languages: Ilocano; Itneg; Isneg; Filipino; English
- Website: www.abra.gov.ph

Abra, officially the Province of Abra (Ilocano: Probinsia ti Abra; Inlaod Itneg: Probinsiya ta Abra; Maeng Itneg: Probinsiya di Abra; Moyadan Itneg: Probinsiya ti Abra; Filipino: Lalawigan ng Abra), is a province in the Cordillera Administrative Region of the Philippines. Its capital is the municipality of Bangued, the most populous in the province. It is bordered by Ilocos Norte on the northwest, Apayao on the northeast, Kalinga on the mid-east, Mountain Province on the southeast, and Ilocos Sur on the southwest.

== Etymology ==
Abra is from the Spanish word abre meaning gorge, pass, breach or opening; abra itself is a Spanish word of 'opening.' It was first used by the Spaniards to denote the region above the Banaoang Gap where the Abra River exits into the South China Sea, thus the Rio Grande de Abra.

== History ==
=== Early history ===
The first inhabitants of Abra were the ancestors of the Bontocs and the Ifugaos. These inhabitants eventually left to settle in the old Mountain Province. Other early inhabitants were the Tinguians or Itnegs.

=== Spanish colonial era ===
In 1585, the Tinguians were mentioned for the first time in a letter from Father Domingo de Salazar to the King of Spain.

In 1598, Bangued was occupied by Spanish-Iloco forces. The Spanish established a garrison to protect their missionaries from headhunters so that they could Christianize the Tinguians and locate gold mines. This led to the Ilocano settlement of this area.

Bangued was under the care of the Spanish missions in Vigan and Bantay. Fr. Esteban Marin and Fr. Agustin Minon established a mission in Bangued as early as 1598. On April 5, 1612, Fr. Pedro Columbo became the first minister. It would seem that this actuation of the Augustinians was precipitated by the Dominican takeover of the ministry of Narvacan since the Dominicans wanted to convert Narvacan into a mission center to evangelize the other parts of Abra. To check this Dominican move, the Augustinians elevated Bangued to a ministry.

Fr. Juan Pareja OSA, a former parish priest in Bantay, led the conversion of the province. He came to Abra in 1626 and is reported to have converted as many as 3,000 inhabitants, including the chieftain Miguel Dumaoal. He founded the mission of San Diego and later the ministry of Bangued. He established the following towns as visitas of Bangued: Tayum, Sabangan and Bucao (now Dolores). Inspired by Fr. Pareja, these towns battled almost daily against the rancherias of Palang, Talamuy, Bataan, Cabulao, Calaoag, and Langiden.

Fr. Jose Polanco OP also contributed to the conversion of Abra. A man of austere mortification, he died in Abra in 1679 and was considered a saint by the locals.

Fr. Bernardino Lago OSA arrived in the early 19th century. In 1823, Fr. Lago began work in Pidigan. After 25 years, the Christians were numbered about a thousand "baptized, living in community, with schools, church and municipal house, tilling the earth to support themselves and their children." Fr. Lago also founded the town of La Paz. Fr. Galende enumerates the foundation of the other towns of Abra:

- Tayum, 1803
- San Gregorio, 1829
- Pidigan, 1823
- La Paz, 1832
- Bucay, 1847
- San Jose, 1848
- Villavieja, 1862
- San Quintin, 1868
- Dolores, 1882
- Pilar, 1882
- San Juan, 1884
- Alfonso XII, 1884

Originally, the area was called El Abra de Vigan ("The Opening of Vigan"). During the British Occupation of the Philippines, Gabriela Silang and her army fled to Abra from Ilocos and continued the revolt begun by her slain husband Diego Silang. She was captured and hanged by authorities in 1763.

In 1818, the Ilocos region was divided into Ilocos Norte and Ilocos Sur. On October 9, 1846, Abra became an independent province with the capital and residence of the provincial governor located in Bucay. In 1863, the capital was transferred to Bangued, the province's oldest town. It remained so until the arrival of the Americans in 1899.

=== American occupation ===
In 1908, the Philippine Commission annexed Abra into Ilocos Sur in an attempt to resolve Abra's financial difficulties. On March 9, 1917, the Philippine Assembly re-established Abra as a province under Act 2683.

=== Japanese occupation ===
During World War II, Japanese forces occupied Abra in 1942. The province was liberated by Filipino soldiers and guerrillas in 1945. The Battle of Abra was characterized by intense fighting between Filipino guerrillas/Allied forces and the Japanese military. The capital, Bangued, experienced intense conflict during the liberation, including heavy carpet bombing and artillery fire from American forces to remove the Japanese, resulting in significant destruction of ancestral homes.

=== Martial law era ===
The beginning months of the 1970s marked a period of turmoil and change in the Philippines, as well as in Abra. During his bid to be the first Philippine president to be re-elected for a second term, Ferdinand Marcos launched an unprecedented number of public works projects. This caused the Philippine economy took a sudden downwards turn known as the 1969 Philippine balance of payments crisis, which in turn led to a period of economic difficulty and social unrest.

With only a year left in his last constitutionally allowed term as president, Ferdinand Marcos placed the Philippines under Martial Law in September 1972 and thus retained the position for fourteen more years. This period in Philippine history is remembered for the Marcos administration's record of human rights abuses, particularly targeting political opponents, student activists, journalists, religious workers, farmers, and others who fought against the Marcos dictatorship. In Abra, many of the victims were from the indigenous Itneg people (known then among most lowlanders as the Tingguian people, which is an exonym). Numerous human rights abuses against Itnegs were documented in the various Amnesty International missions which allowed to conduct investigations in the country after Marcos had to give in to political pressure.

On May 6, 1983, Sitio Beew in the Municipality of Tubo was the site of several attacks by the 623rd Philippine Constabulary (623rd PC) led by Captain Berido, Lt. Rehaldo Lebua and Lt. Juanito Puyawan, which would collectively come to be known as the "Beew massacre." The 623rd PC burned down four houses and a rice granary, which still contained the remains of three villagers including an unborn baby, and Barangay Councilman Rodolfo Labawig, pregnant mother Josefina Cayandag, and her unborn child. Beew residents, including babies and toddlers, were beaten and their houses looted in response to the residents' alleged support of protests against the logging operations of Herminio Disini's Cellophil Resources Corporation in their area.

=== Later 20th Century ===
The revolutionary Marxist priest Conrado Balweg, who fought for the rights of the Cordillera tribes, began his crusade in Abra. After successfully negotiating a peace accord with Balweg's group in 1987, the Philippine government created the Cordillera Administrative Region, which includes Abra.

=== Contemporary history ===
On July 27, 2022, a magnitude 7.0 earthquake, jolted the province. Eleven people died (at least seven of them were from Abra), and more than 600 were injured. A magnitude 6.4 aftershock three months later injured more than 100 people and caused additional damage.

The province is notorious for its election-related crimes, hence earning some nicknames including the title as the "Killing Fields of the North." Through the decades, there have been numerous assassinations of alleged supporters, former politicians, and even incumbent officials. These killings include the gunning incident that took the life of then Vice Governor Rafael Blanco; and the more recent and notorious incident involving Rep. Luis Bersamin in 2006, which earned nationwide attention. These election-related crimes typically occur months before and during both the midterm and general elections. Most especially weeks before the official filing of COCs (Certificate of Candidacy), and during the campaign period. With this, the Commission on Elections along with concerned agencies (e.g. DILG, PNP, etc.), usually identifies several municipalities in the province as "areas of concern," in which they bear the Category Red in terms of election hot spots.

== Geography ==
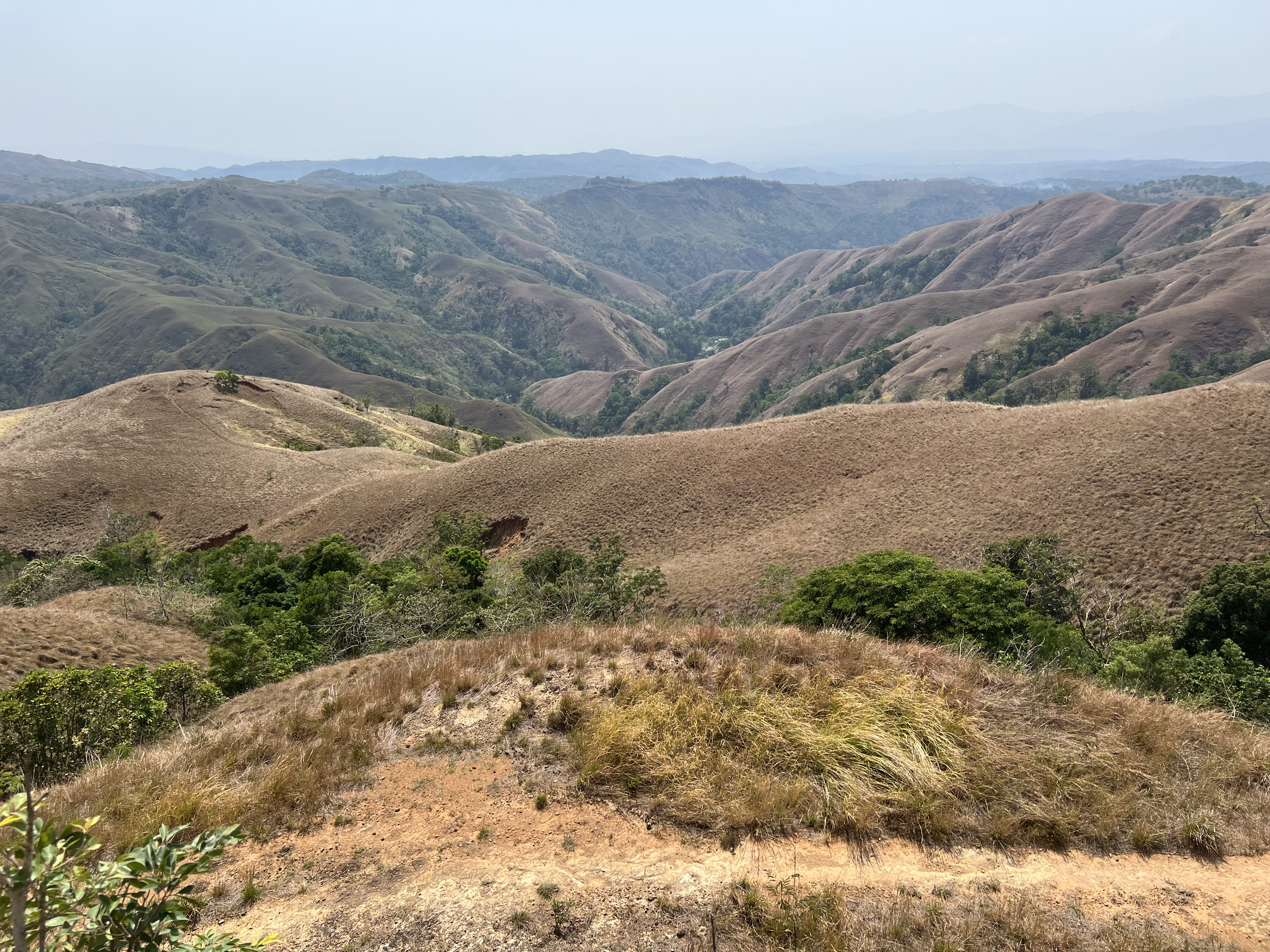
Apao Rolling Hills, Tineg

Abra is situated in the mid-western section of the Cordillera Administrative Region in Luzon. It is bordered by the provinces of Ilocos Norte on the northwest, Apayao on the northeast, Kalinga on the mid-east, Mountain Province on the southeast and Ilocos Sur on the southwest. Abra has a total land area of 4,165.25 square kilometres or 1,608.21 square miles.

The province is bordered by the towering mountain ranges of the Ilocos in the west and the Cordillera Central in the east. The Abra River runs from the south in Benguet to the west and central areas bisecting the Abra Valley. It is joined by the Tineg River originating in the eastern uplands at a point near the municipality of Dolores.

=== Administrative divisions ===
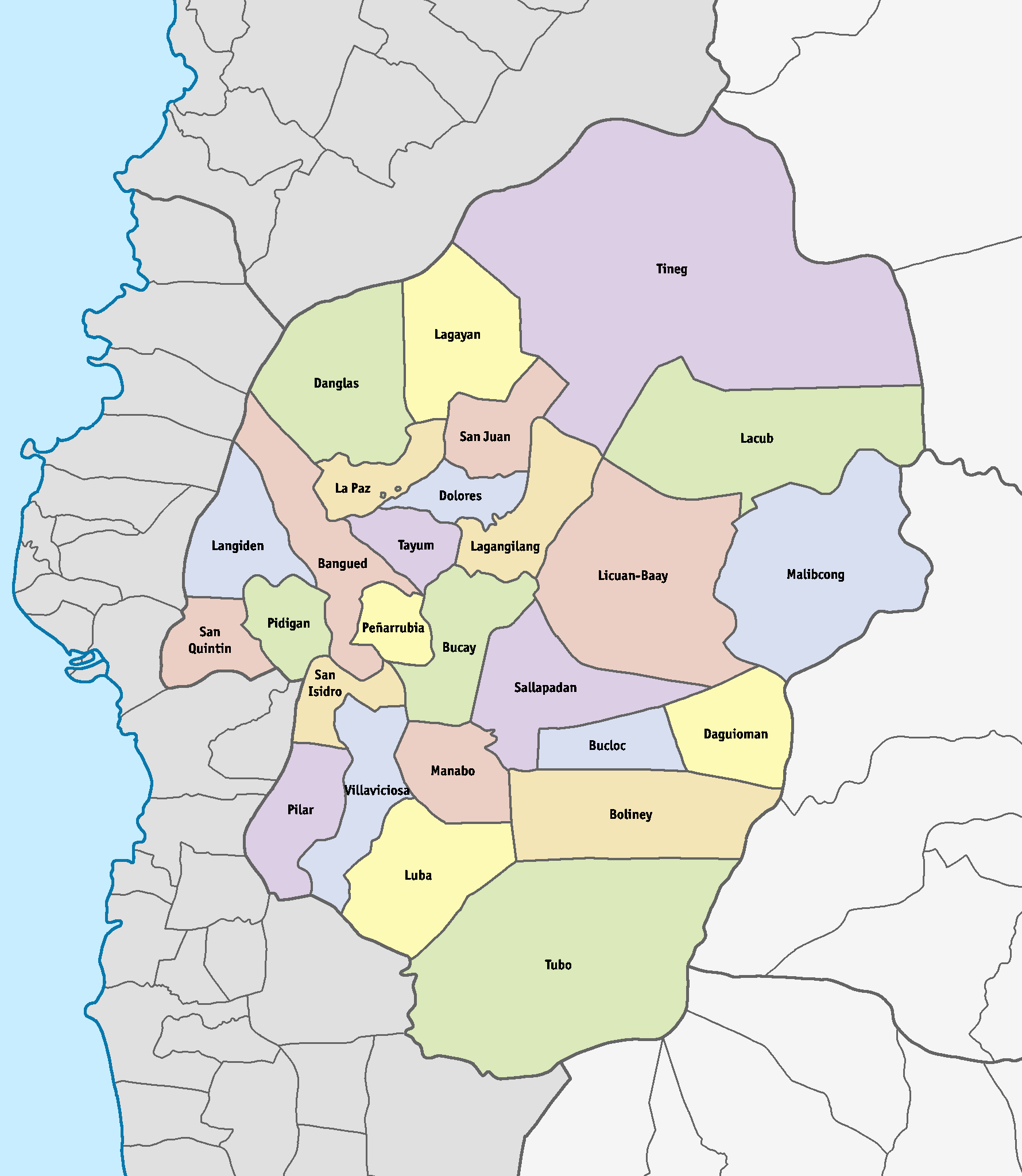
Political map of Abra

Abra is composed of 27 municipalities, all encompassed by Abra's lone congressional district.

Municipality (Note: Former names are italicized.) (Note: The globe icon marks the town center.)		Population			±% p.a.	Area		Density (2020)		Barangay
		(2020)		(2015)		km^{2}	sq mi	/km^{2}	/sq mi	
Bangued	†	20.1%	50,382	48,163	+0.86%	136.40	52.66	370	960	31
Boliney		1.8%	4,551	3,573	+4.71%	210.00	81.08	22	57	8
Bucay		7.4%	17,953	17,115	+0.91%	102.16	39.44	180	470	21
Bucloc		1.0%	2,395	2,501	−0.82%	63.77	24.62	38	98	4
Daguioman		0.8%	2,019	2,088	−0.64%	114.37	44.16	18	47	4
Danglas		1.6%	4,074	4,192	−0.54%	156.02	60.24	26	67	7
Dolores		4.6%	11,512	11,315	+0.33%	47.45	18.32	240	620	15
La Paz		6.6%	16,493	15,437	+1.27%	51.41	19.85	320	830	12
Lacub		1.4%	3,612	3,403	+1.14%	235.53	90.94	15	39	6
Lagangilang		5.9%	14,914	14,255	+0.86%	124.20	47.95	120	310	17
Lagayan		1.8%	4,488	4,499	−0.05%	215.97	83.39	21	54	5
Langiden		1.4%	3,576	3,198	+2.15%	116.29	44.90	31	80	6
Licuan-Baay (Licuan)		1.8%	4,566	4,689	−0.50%	256.42	99.00	18	47	11
Luba		2.6%	6,518	6,339	+0.53%	148.27	57.25	44	110	8
Malibcong		1.6%	4,027	3,428	+3.11%	283.17	109.33	14	36	12
Manabo		4.6%	11,611	10,761	+1.46%	81.08	31.31	140	360	11
Peñarrubia		2.8%	6,951	6,640	+0.88%	39.07	15.09	180	470	9
Pidigan		5.0%	12,475	12,185	+0.45%	49.15	18.98	250	650	15
Pilar		4.0%	10,146	10,223	−0.14%	66.10	25.52	150	390	19
Sallapadan		2.5%	6,389	6,622	−0.68%	128.62	49.66	50	130	9
San Isidro		1.9%	4,745	4,574	+0.70%	48.07	18.56	99	260	9
San Juan		4.3%	10,688	9,867	+1.53%	64.08	24.74	170	440	19
San Quintin		2.3%	5,705	5,438	+0.92%	66.59	25.71	86	220	6
Tayum		5.9%	14,869	14,467	+0.52%	55.68	21.50	270	700	11
Tineg		2.0%	4,977	5,097	−0.45%	744.80	287.57	6.7	17	10
Tubo		2.3%	5,674	5,699	−0.08%	492.12	190.01	12	31	10
Villaviciosa		2.3%	5,675	5,392	+0.98%	102.93	39.74	55	140	8
Total			250,985	241,160	+0.76%	4,199.72	1,608.21	60	160	303
	† Provincial capital					Municipality				

=== Barangays ===
The 27 municipalities of the province comprise a total of 303 barangays, with Poblacion in La Paz as the most populous in 2010, and Pattaoig in San Juan as the least.

== Demographics ==
The population of Abra in the 2024 census was 246,948 people, with a density of 59 inhabitants per square kilometre or 150 inhabitants per square mile.

Population census of Abra
Year	Pop.	±% p.a.
1903	51,860	—
1918	72,731	+2.28%
1939	87,780	+0.90%
1948	86,600	−0.15%
1960	115,193	+2.41%
1970	145,508	+2.36%
1975	147,010	+0.21%
1980	160,198	+1.73%
1990	184,743	+1.44%
1995	195,964	+1.11%
2000	209,491	+1.44%
2007	230,953	+1.35%
2010	234,733	+0.59%
2015	241,160	+0.52%
2020	250,985	+0.84%
2024	246,948	−0.39%
Source: PSA

Population by ethnicity (2000)
Ethnicity	Number
Ilocano	150,457 (71.94%)
Tingguian	39,115 (18.70%)
Ibanag	9,334 (4.46%)
Itneg	6,624 (3.17%)
Tagalog	869 (0.42%)
Others	2,175 (1.04%)
Other foreign ethnicity	16 (0.01%)
Not Reported	556 (0.27%)

Abra's inhabitants are mostly descendants of Ilocano settlers and members of the Tingguian tribe. Based on 2000 census data, Ilocanos comprised 71.94% (150,457) of the total provincial population of 209,146. Tingguians came in second at 18.7% (39,115), while other ethnic groups in the province were the Ibanag at 4.46% (9,334), Itneg at 3.17% (6,624), and Tagalog at 0.42% (869).

=== Languages ===
The predominant languages of Abra are Ilocano and Itneg.

== Economy ==
Poverty incidence of Abra (%)

Source: Philippine Statistics Authority

As of 1990 there were 743 cottage industries in Abra of which 208 are registered with the Department of Trade and Industry. 59% are engaged in bamboo and rattan craft making, both leading industries in the area.

Abra's economy is agriculture-based. Its major crops are rice, vegetables and root crops. Commercial products include coffee, tobacco and coconut. Extensive grassland and pasture areas are used for livestock production.

== Government ==
Current Provincial Government Officials (2025-2028)

- Governor: Eustaquio P. Bersamin (PFP)
- Vice-Governor: Ana Marie A. Bersamin (PFP)

Sangguniang Panlalawigan Members

1st District

- Jane M. Cecilia (PFP)
- Rodolfo S. De la Paz (PFP)
- Rudolfo A. Bernardez III (PFP)
- Bruno O. Domingo (PFP)

2nd District

- Patrocino B. Abaya Jr. (PFP)
- Byrone B. Alzate (PFP)
- Mark Froilan P. Seares (PFP)
- Luis Jorobots B. Bersamin IV (NPC)
- Francis Cesar B. Bringas (Asenso)
- Vladimir Ivan Q. Benwaren (Asenso)

Ex-Officio Members

- Fidel B. Belena (President, Liga ng mga Barangay)
- Jason A. Cantil (President, PCL)
- Cynlai Osorio (President, Panlalawigang Pederasyon ng Sangguniang Kabataan)
- Romero Daoaten (Representative, IPMR)

== House of Representatives ==
District	Representative	Party	Term	Bloc
Lone	Joseph Sto. Niño B. Bernos	NUP	1	Majority

== Sports ==
The province's lone professional sports team is the Abra Weavers of the Maharlika Pilipinas Basketball League (MPBL). The Weavers joined the league in the 2024 season.

== Government ==
List of former military and elected governors:

- Don Ramon Tajonera y Marzal (Military Governor): 1846–1852
- Don Esteban de Peñarrubia (Military Governor): 1868–?
- Col. William Bowen (Military Governor): 1901
- Juan G. Villamor (Governor): 1902–1904
- Joaquin J. Ortega (Governor): 1904–1914
- Rosalio G. Eduarte (Governor): 1914–1916
- Julio V. Borbon (Governor): 1916–1922
- Virgilio V. Valera (Governor): 1922–1925
- Eustaquio P. Purugganan (Governor): 1925–1930
- Virgilio V. Valera (Governor): 1930–1936
- Bienvenido N. Valera (Governor): 1936–1939
- Eustaquio P. Purugganan (Governor): 1939–1941
- Bernardo V. Bayquen (Governor): 1941–1944
- Zacarias A. Crispin (Governor): 1944–1946
- Juan C. Brillantes (Governor): 1946–1947
- Luis F. Bersamin (Governor): 1947–1951
- Lucas P. Paredes (Governor): 1951–1953
- Vene B. Pe Benito was acting governor in 1953
- Ernesto P. Parel (Governor): 1953–1954
- Jose L. Valera (Governor):1954–1963
- Carmelo Z. Barbero (Governor): 1963–1965
- Petronilo V. Seares (Governor): 1965–1971
- Gabino V. Balbin (Governor): 1971–1977
- Arturo V. Barbero (Governor): 1977–1984
- Andres B. Bernos (Governor): 1984–1986
- Vicente P. Valera (Governor): 1986–1987
- Buenaventura V. Buenafe was acting governor in 1987
- Vicente Y. Valera (Governor): 1988–1998
- Constante B. Culangen was acting governor in 1998
- Maria Zita Claustro-Valera (Governor): 1998–2001
- Vicente Y. Valera (Governor): 2001–2007
- Eustaquio P. Bersamin (Governor): 2007–2016; 2025-present
- Maria Jocelyn Valera Bernos (Governor): 2016–2022
- Dominic B. Valera (Governor): 2022–2024
- Russell A. Bragas was acting governor in 2024-2025

== Notable people ==
- Conrado Balweg – former Filipino Catholic priest and rebel, founder of the Cordillera People's Liberation Army, a militant group which advocated autonomy for the Cordillera region
- Kurt Bryan Barbosa – taekwondo athlete and SEA Games gold medallist
- Lucas Bersamin – Chief Justice of the Philippines from 2018 to 2019
- Myrna Toribio Esguerra – crowned Binibining Pilipinas International 2024 from Pidigan
- Teofilo Garcia – hatter and recipient of the National Living Treasure award, from San Quintin
- Quintín Paredes – lawyer, politician, and statesman; President of the Senate of the Philippines in 1952
- Pura Sumangil – community activist
- Jesús A. Villamor – fighter pilot, spy, and Medal of Valor awardee. The Villamor Air Base, the headquarters of the Philippine Air Force, is named in his honor.
- Ignacio Villamor – lawyer, Associate Justice of Supreme Court, and the first Filipino president of the University of the Philippines
