= San Quintin, Abra =

Municipality in Abra, Philippines

San Quintin Talamey
- Municipality
- Municipality of San Quintin
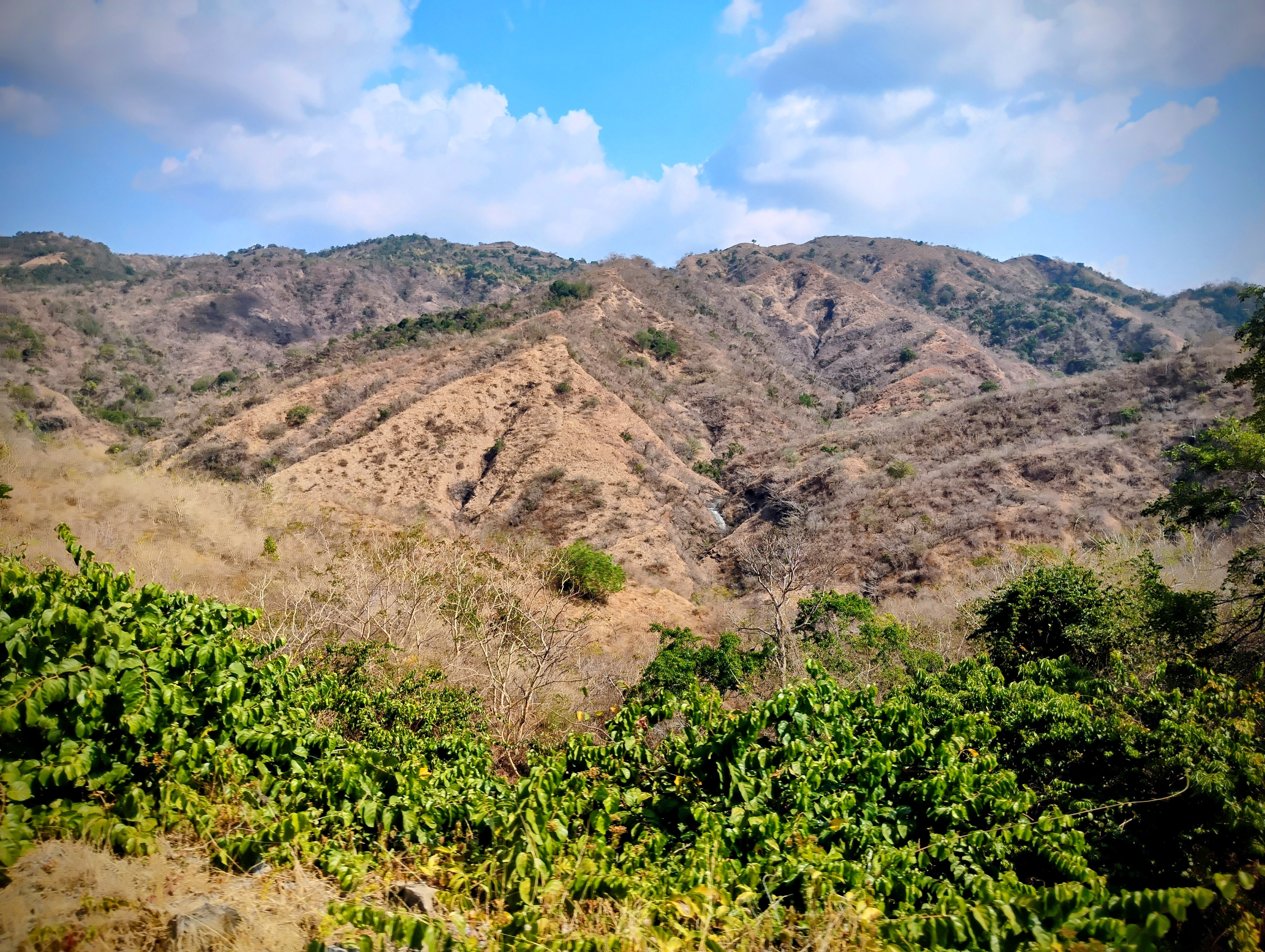
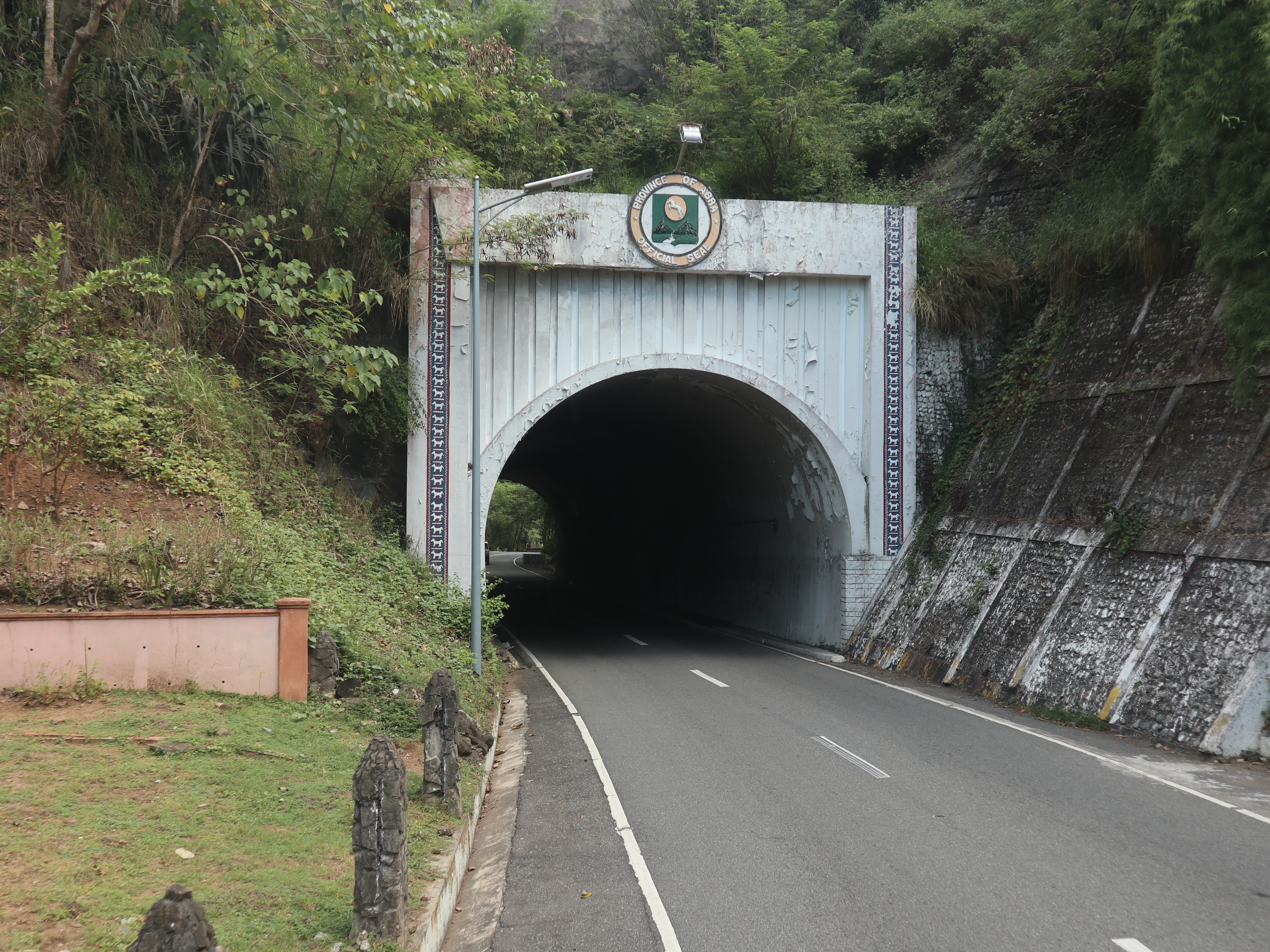
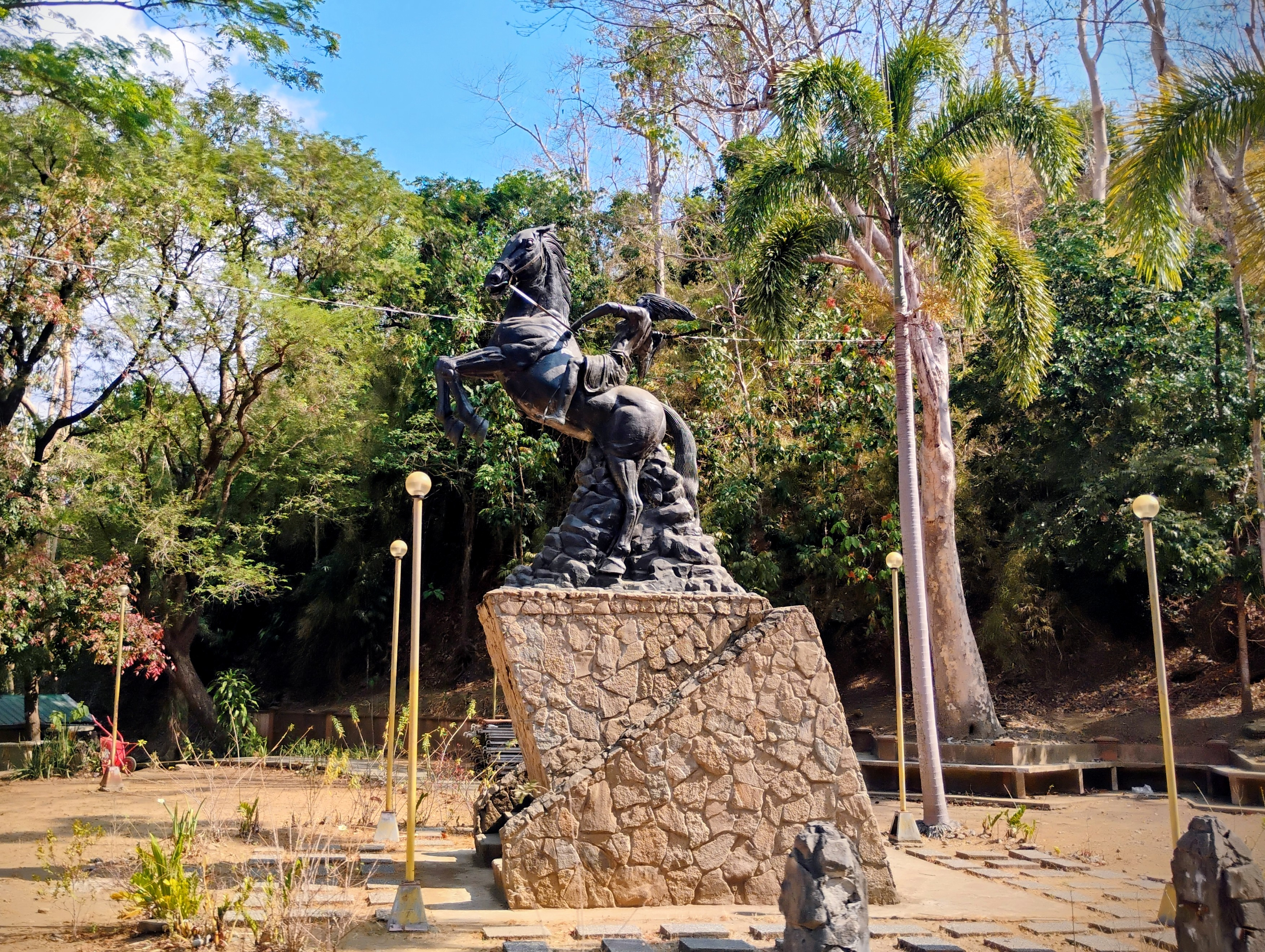
- Tangadan Hills Tangadan Tunnel Gabriela Silang Monument

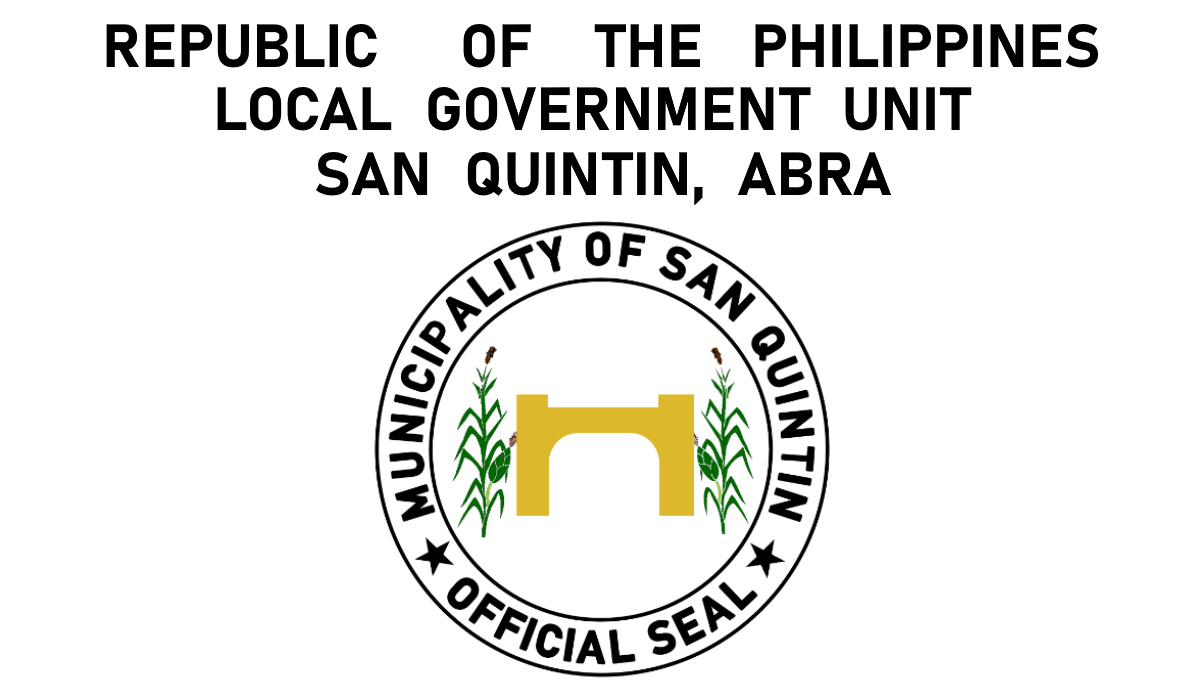
- Flag

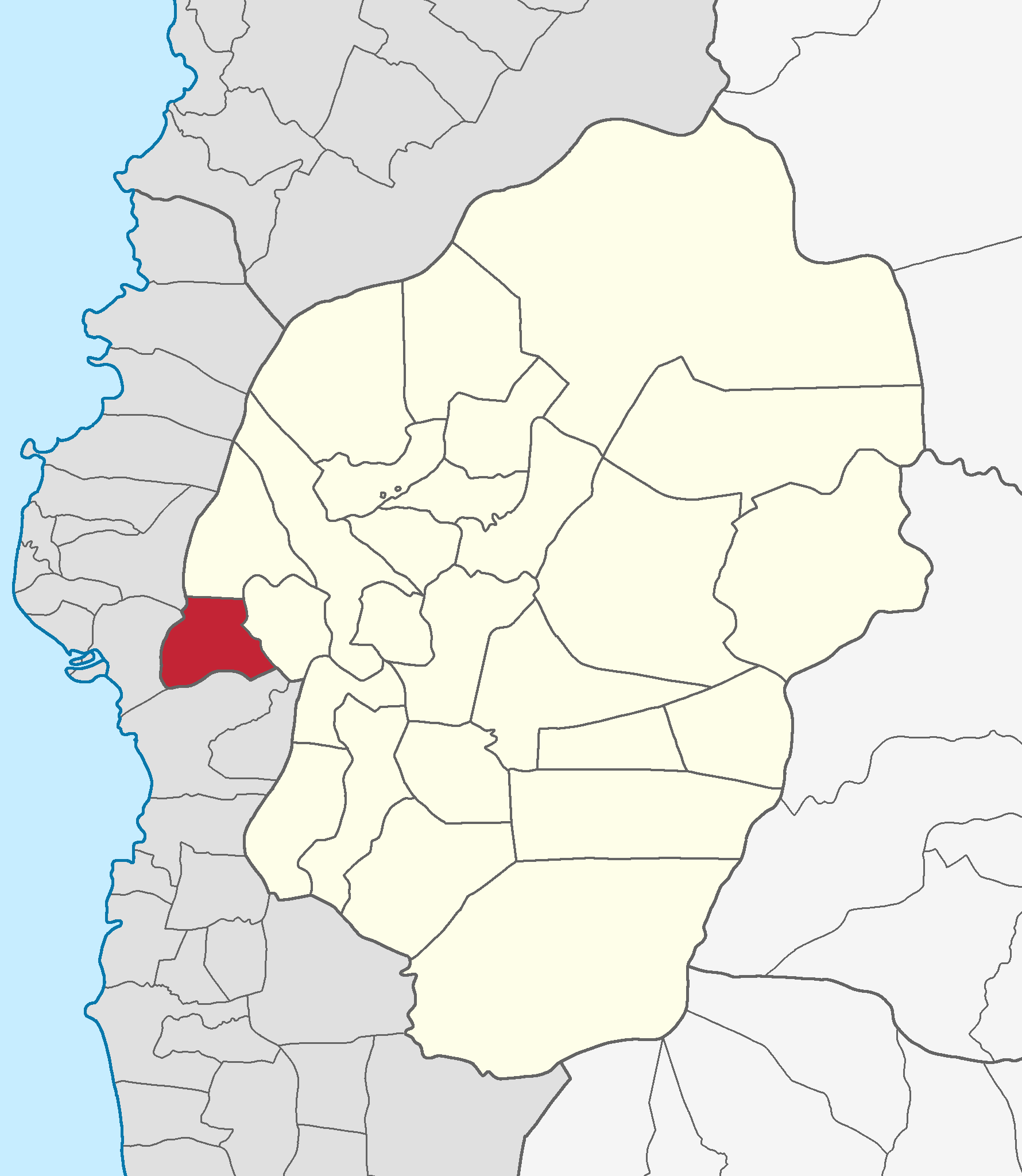
- Map of Abra with San Quintin highlighted
- Interactive map of San Quintin
- Location within the Philippines
- Coordinates: 17°32′N 120°31′E
- Country: Philippines
- Region: Cordillera Administrative Region
- Province: Abra
- District: Lone district
- Barangays: 6 (see Barangays)

Government
  - Type: Sangguniang Bayan
  - Mayor: Amador B. Diaz
  - Vice Mayor: Geroldo C. Aznar
  - Representative: Joseph Santo Niño B. Bernos
  - Municipal Council: Members: Alberto C. Agcolob; Glenda A. Garcia; Merlita M. Aznar; Robbie Ann F. Molina; Dennis C. de Peralta; Amado V. Cabilan; Ronald B. Rubio; Teresita J. Garcia
  - Electorate: 4,582 voters (2025)

Area
  - Total: 66.59 km^{2} (25.71 sq mi)
- Elevation: 140 m (460 ft)
- Highest elevation: 619 m (2,031 ft)
- Lowest elevation: 7 m (23 ft)

Population (2024 census)
  - Total: 5,963
  - Density: 89.55/km^{2} (231.9/sq mi)
  - Households: 1,438

Economy
  - Income class: 3rd municipal income class
  - Poverty incidence: 6.35% (2023)
  - Revenue: ₱ 187.9 million (2022)
  - Assets: ₱ 485.8 million (2022)
  - Expenditure: ₱ 232.8 million (2022)
  - Liabilities: ₱ 30.5 million (2022)

Service provider
  - Electricity: Abra Electric Cooperative (ABRECO)
- Time zone: UTC+8 (PST)
- ZIP code: 2808
- PSGC: 1400123000
- IDD : area code: +63 (0)74
- Native languages: Itneg; Ilocano; Tagalog

San Quintin, officially the Municipality of San Quintin (Ilocano: Ili ti San Quintin; Tagalog: Bayan ng San Quintin), is a municipality in the province of Abra, Philippines. According to the 2024 census, it has a population of 5,963 people.

The town is known for the Tugot ni Angalo, believed to be the footprint of the giant who was the first man in Abra mythology.

== Geography ==
The Municipality of San Quintin is located at 17°32′N 120°31′E. According to the Philippine Statistics Authority, the municipality has a land area of 66.59 square kilometres (25.71 sq mi) constituting 1.60% of the 4,165.25-square-kilometre- (1,608.21 sq mi) total area of Abra.

San Quintin is situated 20.57 kilometres (12.78 mi) from the provincial capital Bangued, and 391.38 kilometres (243.19 mi) from the country's capital city of Manila.

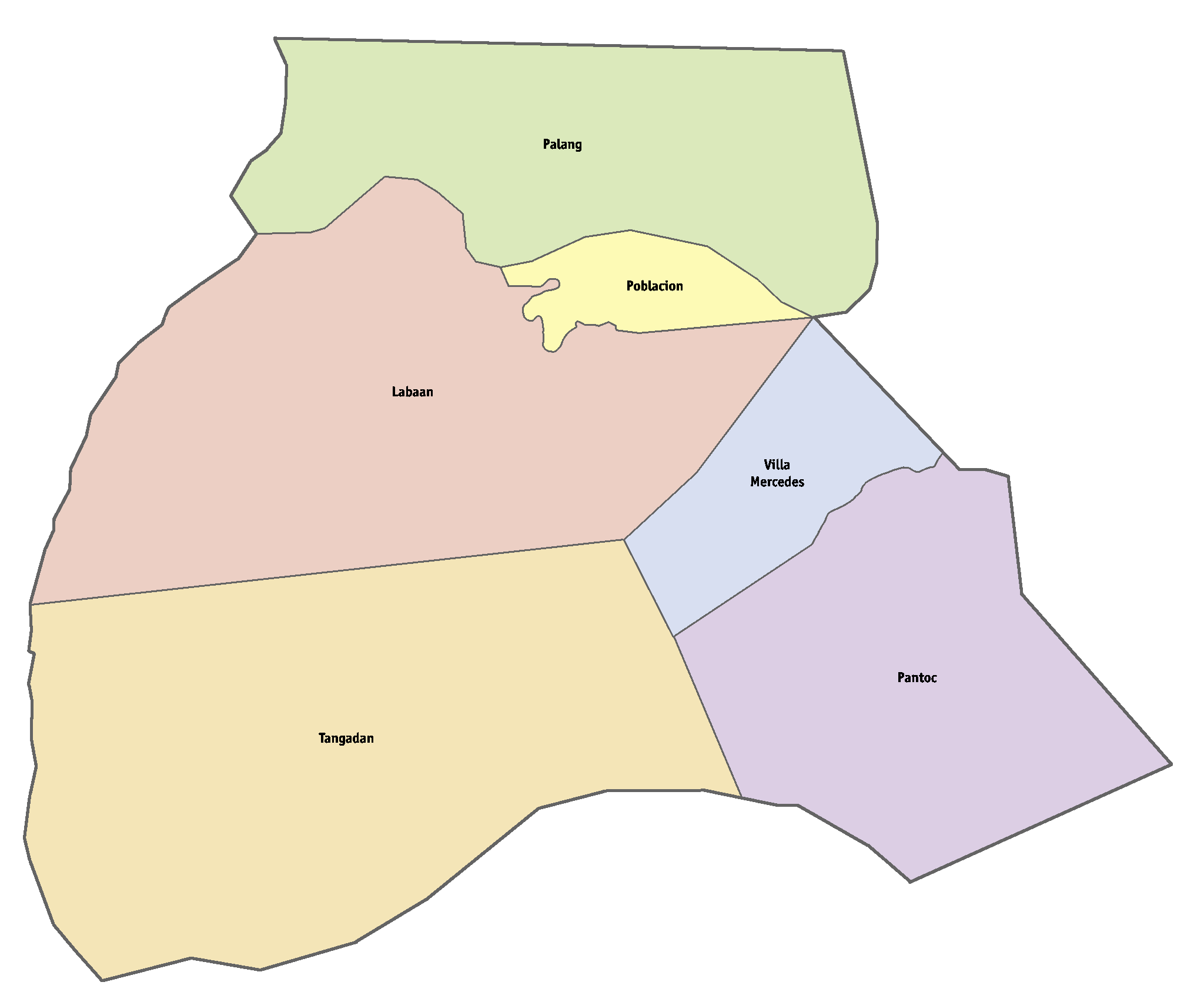
Political map of San Quintin

=== Barangays ===
San Quintin is politically subdivided into 6 barangays. Each barangay consists of puroks and some have sitios.

PSGC	Barangay	Population			±% p.a.	
		2024		2010		
140123001	Labaan	17.3%	1,031	882	▴	1.09%
140123002	Palang	9.7%	580	589	▾	−0.11%
140123003	Pantoc	11.9%	712	676	▴	0.36%
140123004	Poblacion	13.5%	807	741	▴	0.59%
140123005	Tangadan	26.0%	1,552	1,362	▴	0.91%
140123006	Villa Mercedes	17.2%	1,023	983	▴	0.28%
	Total		5,963	5,705	▴	0.31%

=== Climate ===
Climate data for San Quintin, Abra
Month	Jan	Feb	Mar	Apr	May	Jun	Jul	Aug	Sep	Oct	Nov	Dec	Year
Mean daily maximum °C (°F)	29 (84)	31 (88)	32 (90)	34 (93)	32 (90)	31 (88)	30 (86)	30 (86)	30 (86)	30 (86)	30 (86)	29 (84)	31 (87)
Mean daily minimum °C (°F)	18 (64)	19 (66)	21 (70)	23 (73)	24 (75)	25 (77)	24 (75)	24 (75)	24 (75)	22 (72)	21 (70)	19 (66)	22 (72)
Average precipitation mm (inches)	9 (0.4)	11 (0.4)	13 (0.5)	23 (0.9)	92 (3.6)	122 (4.8)	153 (6.0)	137 (5.4)	139 (5.5)	141 (5.6)	42 (1.7)	14 (0.6)	896 (35.4)
Average rainy days	4.6	4.0	6.2	9.1	19.5	23.2	24.0	22.5	21.5	15.2	10.5	6.0	166.3
Source: Meteoblue

== Demographics ==
Population census of San Quintin
Year	Pop.	±% p.a.
1903	877	—
1918	2,152	+6.17%
1939	2,239	+0.19%
1948	1,518	−4.23%
1960	2,495	+4.23%
1970	3,259	+2.70%
1975	3,374	+0.70%
1980	3,574	+1.16%
1990	4,293	+1.85%
1995	4,999	+2.89%
2000	5,130	+0.56%
2007	5,341	+0.56%
2010	5,233	−0.74%
2015	5,438	+0.73%
2020	5,705	+1.01%
2024	5,963	+1.07%
Source: Philippine Statistics Authority

In the 2024 census, San Quintin had a population of 5,963 people. The population density was 90 inhabitants per square kilometre (230/sq mi).

== Economy ==
Poverty incidence of San Quintin (%)

Source: Philippine Statistics Authority

=== Products ===
San Quintin's main products include rice, corn, tobacco, mango and freshwater fish. Fisheries and fish processing training are also launching in the municipality.

== Government ==
=== Local government ===
San Quintin, belonging to the lone congressional district of the province of Abra, is governed by a mayor designated as its local chief executive and by a municipal council as its legislative body in accordance with the Local Government Code. The mayor, vice mayor, and councilors are elected directly by the people through an election held every three years.

=== Elected officials ===
Members of the Municipal Council (2025–2028)
Position	Name
Congressman	Joseph Santo Niño B. Bernos
Mayor	Amador B. Diaz
Vice-Mayor	Geroldo C. Aznar
Councilors	Alberto C. Agcolob
Councilors	Glenda A. Garcia
Councilors	Amado V. Cabilan
Councilors	Merlita M. Aznar
Councilors	Robbie Ann F. Molina
Councilors	Ronald B. Rubio
Councilors	Teresita J. Garcia
Councilors	Dennis C. De Peralta

== Education ==
The San Quintin Schools District Office governs all educational institutions within the municipality. It oversees the management and operations of all private and public, from primary to secondary schools.

=== Primary and elementary schools ===
- Palang Primary School
- Pantoc Elementary School
- Presentar Primary School
- San Quintin Central School
- Talaytay Primary School
- Tangadan Elementary School
- Villa Mercedes Elementary School

=== Secondary school ===
- San Quintin National High School
