= Dolores, Abra =

Municipality in Abra, Philippines

Dolores
- Municipality
- Municipality of Dolores
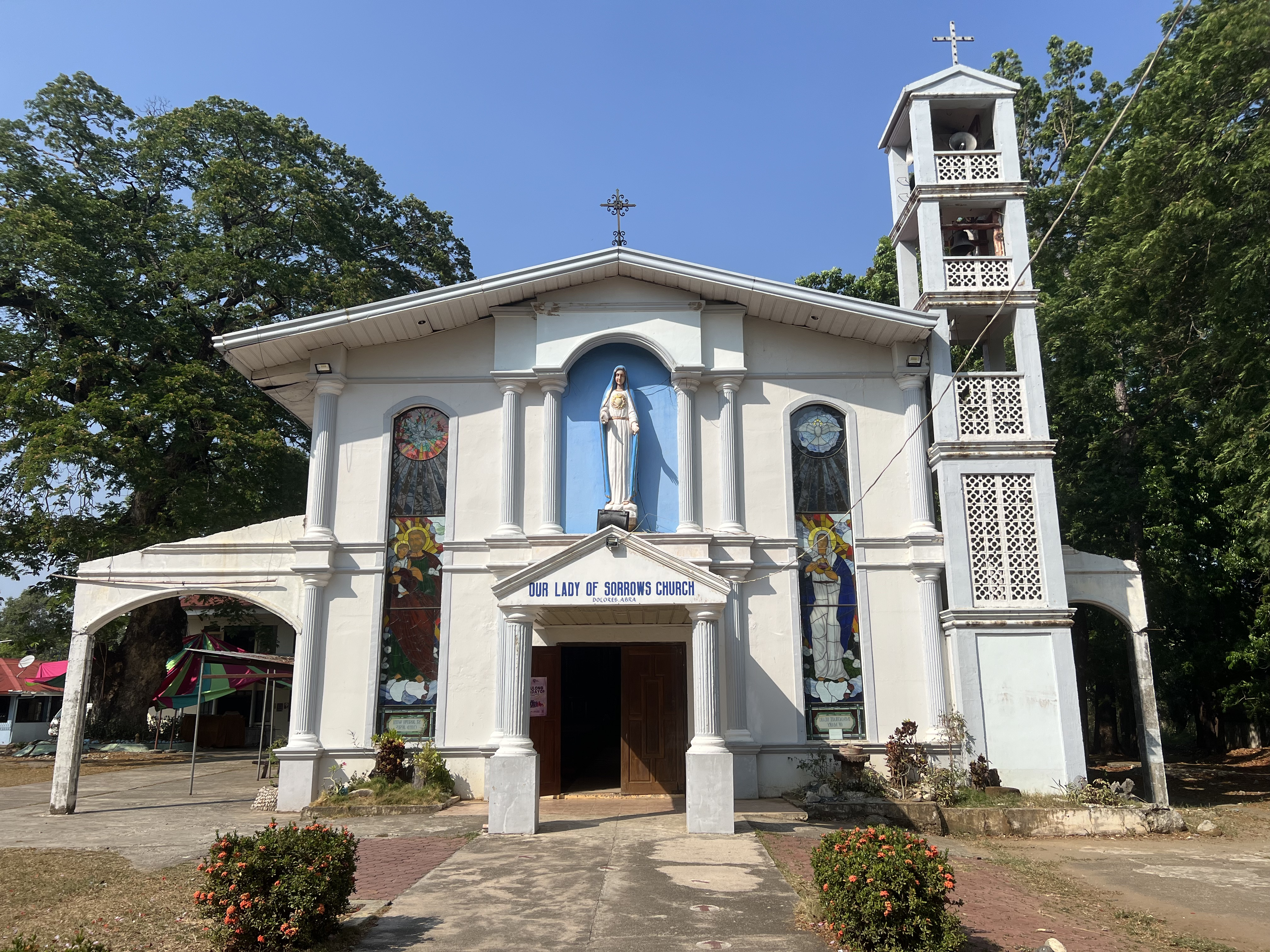
- Our Lady of Sorrows Parish Church

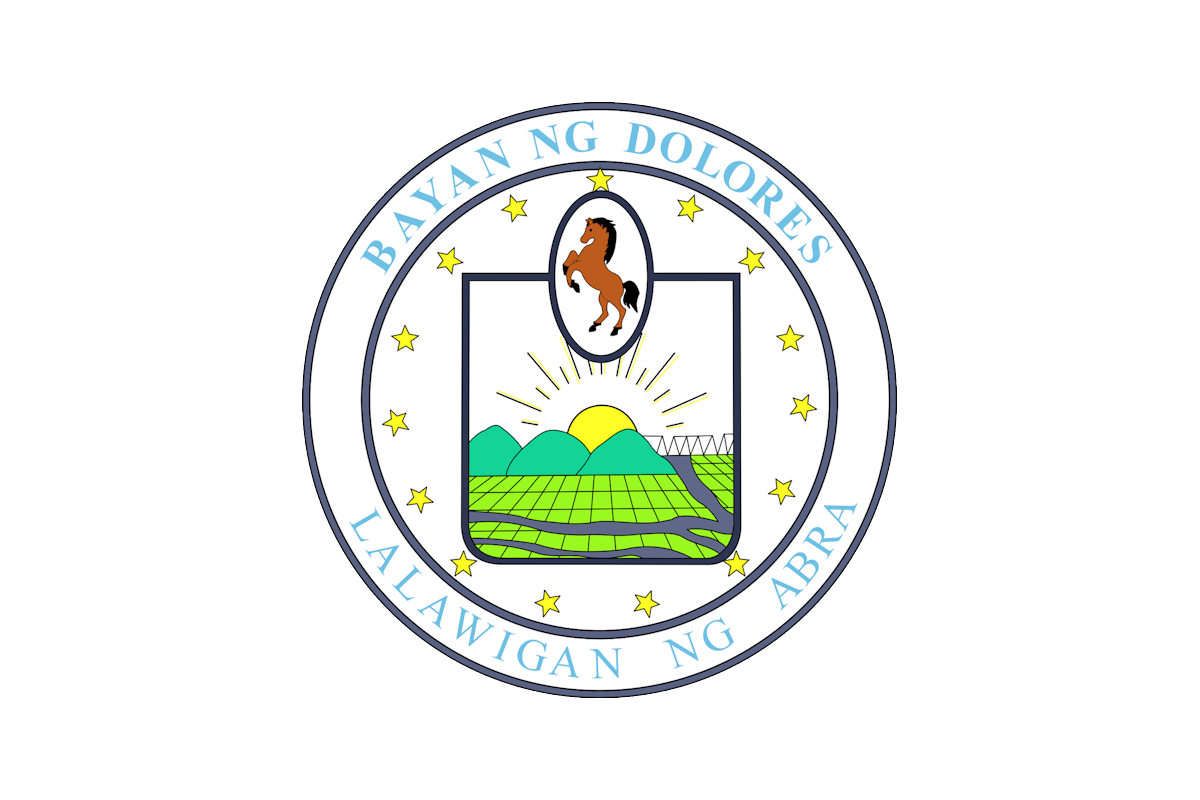
- Flag Seal

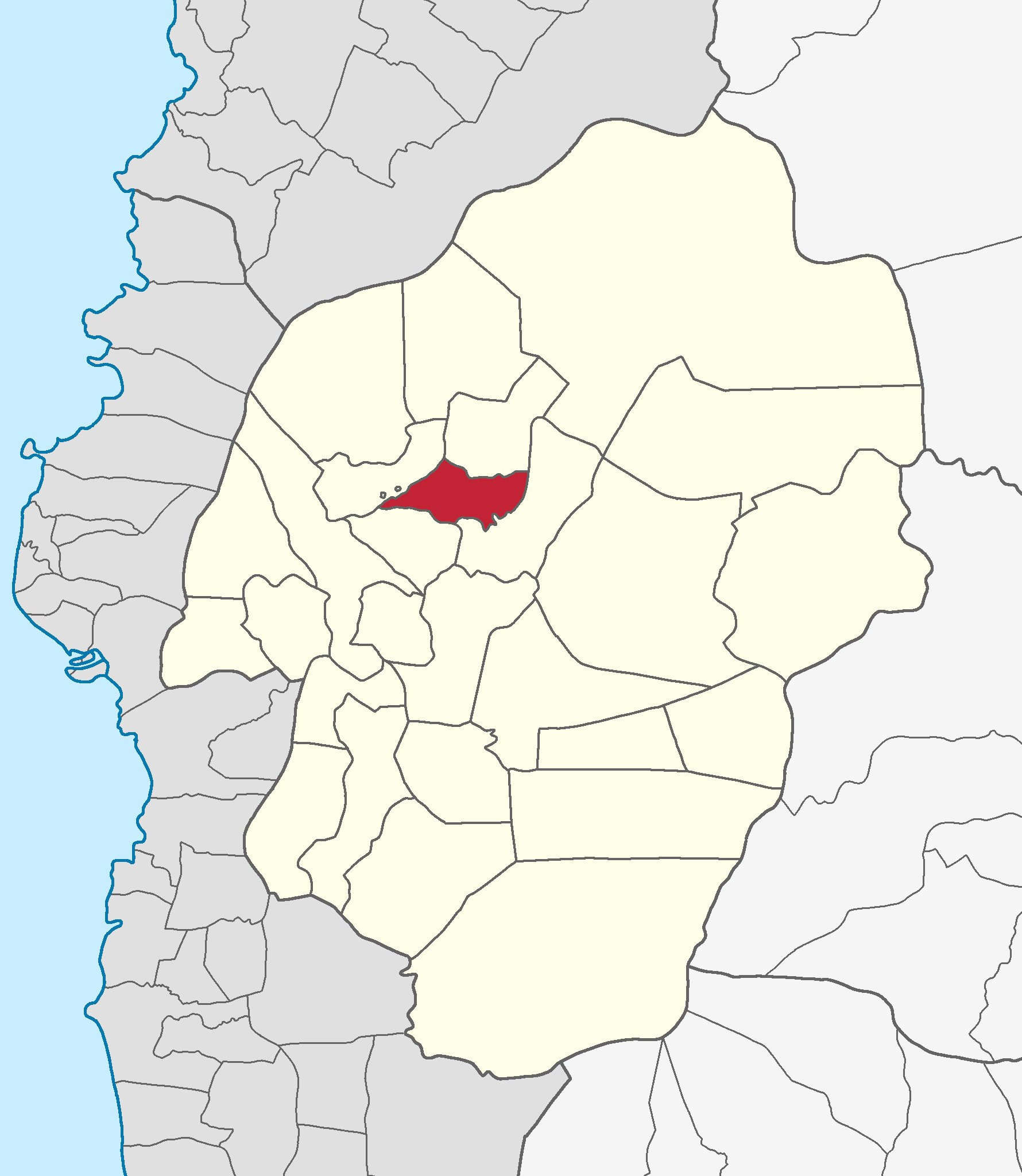
- Map of Abra with Dolores highlighted
- Interactive map of Dolores
- Location within the Philippines
- Coordinates: 17°39′N 120°43′E
- Country: Philippines
- Region: Cordillera Administrative Region
- Province: Abra
- District: Lone district
- Barangays: 15 (see Barangays)

Government
  - Type: Sangguniang Bayan
  - Mayor: Conde T. Turqueza
  - Vice Mayor: Russ Marion T. Zapata
  - Representative: Joseph Santo Niño B. Bernos
  - Municipal Council: Members: David B. Guzman Jr.; Ronnel B. Tordil; Frederick D. Pilorin; Clint Chester B. Guzman; Robert P. Ardaniel; Joel C. Palma; Rodelio R. Pudol; Emelito T. Cortez
  - Electorate: 9,461 voters (2025)

Area
  - Total: 47.45 km^{2} (18.32 sq mi)
- Elevation: 85 m (279 ft)
- Highest elevation: 280 m (920 ft)
- Lowest elevation: 44 m (144 ft)

Population (2024 census)
  - Total: 11,967
  - Density: 252.2/km^{2} (653.2/sq mi)
  - Households: 2,847

Economy
  - Income class: 3rd municipal income class
  - Poverty incidence: 7.9% (2023)
  - Revenue: ₱ 227.8 million (2022)
  - Assets: ₱ 488.3 million (2022)
  - Expenditure: ₱ 202.7 million (2022)
  - Liabilities: ₱ 156.3 million (2022)

Service provider
  - Electricity: Abra Electric Cooperative (ABRECO)
- Time zone: UTC+8 (PST)
- ZIP code: 2801
- PSGC: 1400107000
- IDD : area code: +63 (0)74
- Native languages: Itneg, Ilocano, Filipino
- Website: doloresonline.gov.ph

Dolores, officially the Municipality of Dolores (Ilocano: Ili ti Dolores; Filipino: Bayan ng Dolores), is a municipality in the province of Abra, Philippines. According to the 2024 census, it has a population of 11,967 people.

== Etymology ==
The town was formerly known as Bucao, named after the first Tingguian (Itneg) chieftain who settled in the place long before Spanish colonization. In 1885, it was renamed Dolores in honor of the town's patron saint, Our Lady of Sorrows (Nuestra Señora de los Dolores).

== History ==
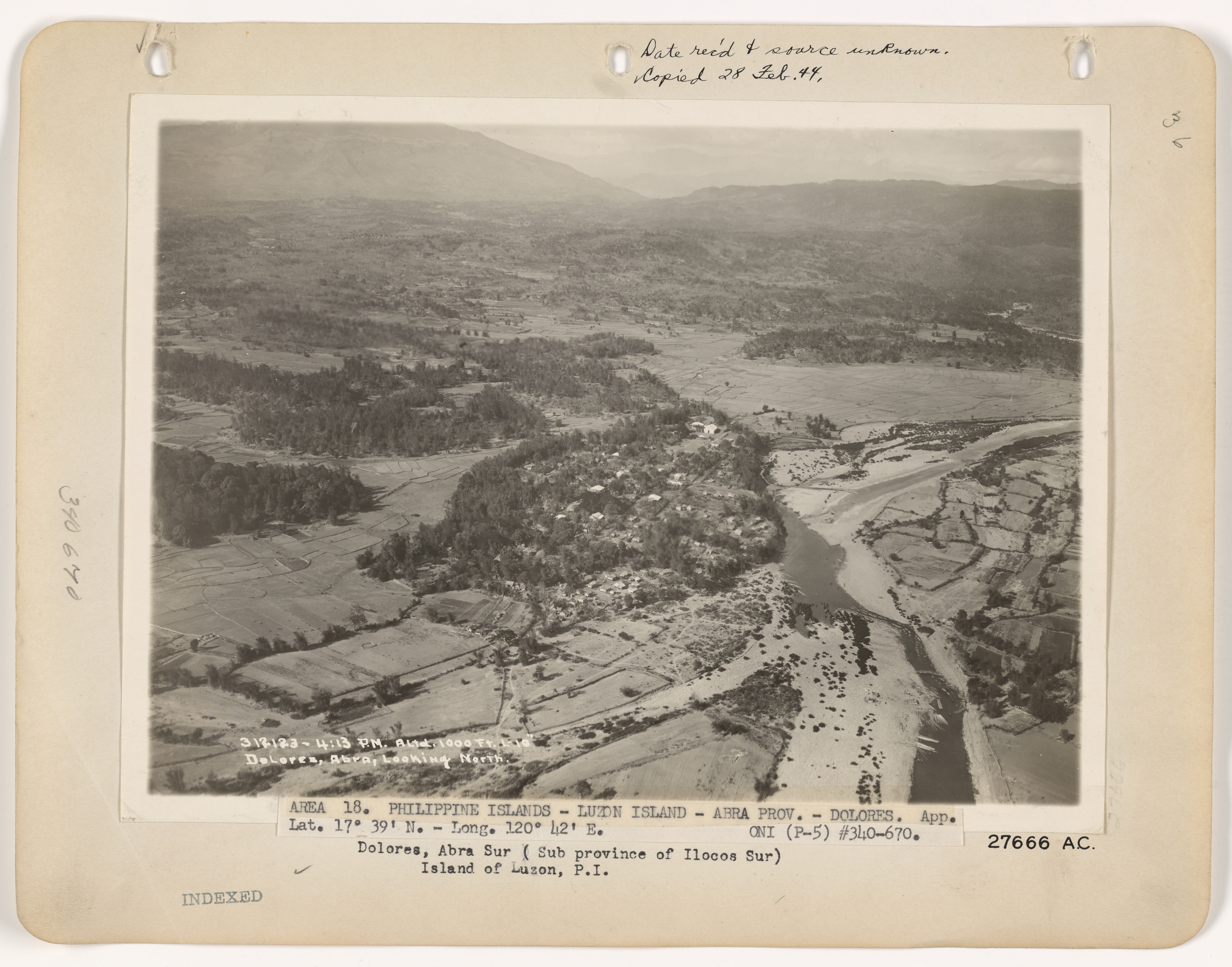
Aerial view of Dolores and the Abra River, date unknown

The place formerly known as Bucao used to be part of the Municipality of Tayum. In 1882, upon the recommendation of the parish priest of Tayum, Fr. Pío Mercado, and the Teniente Bazar of Bucao, Don Ignacio Eduarte, Bucao was created as a separate pueblo. In 1885, Bucao was renamed Dolores, to honor its patron saint, Nuestra Señora de los Dolores (Our Lady Of Sorrows). The first gobernadorcillo of the town was Don Rosalio Eduarte.

== Geography ==
According to the Philippine Statistics Authority, the Municipality of Dolores has a land area of 47.45 square kilometres (18.32 sq mi) constituting 1.14% of the 4,165.25-square-kilometre- (1,608.21 sq mi) total area of Abra. It is located at 17°39′N 120°43′E.

Dolores is situated 17.42 kilometres (10.82 mi) from the provincial capital Bangued, and 423.27 kilometres (263.01 mi) from the country's capital city of Manila.

=== Barangays ===
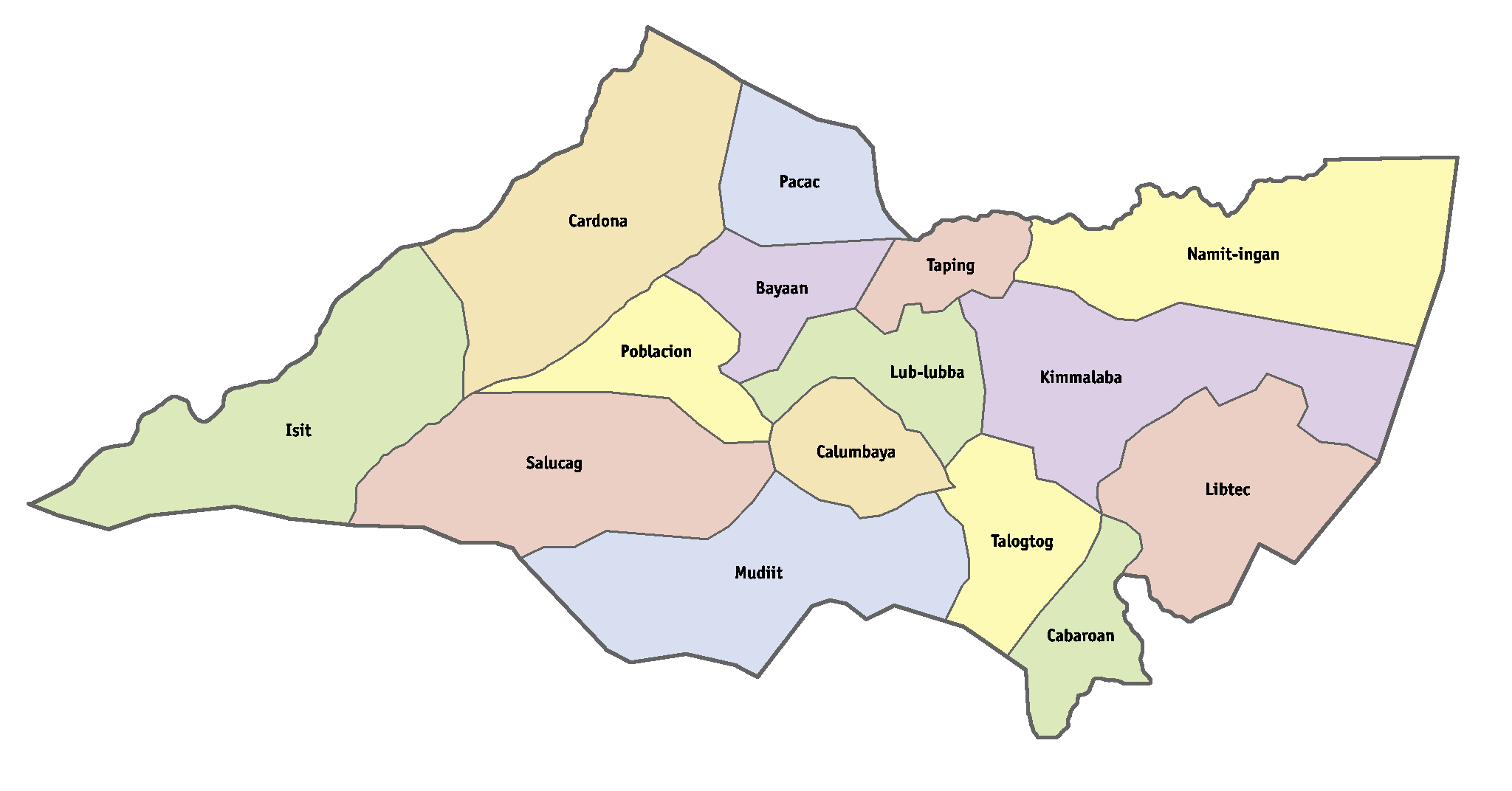
Political map of Dolores

Dolores is politically subdivided into 15 barangays. Each barangay consists of puroks and some have sitios.

PSGC	Barangay	Population			±% p.a.	
		2024		2010		
140107001	Bayaan	4.2%	507	437	▴	1.04%
140107002	Cabaroan	4.4%	522	561	▾	−0.50%
140107003	Calumbaya	4.3%	514	434	▴	1.18%
140107004	Cardona	4.8%	574	463	▴	1.50%
140107005	Isit	7.1%	846	726	▴	1.07%
140107006	Kimmalaba	7.2%	856	889	▾	−0.26%
140107007	Libtec	6.4%	771	638	▴	1.32%
140107008	Lub-lubba	2.7%	323	295	▴	0.63%
140107009	Mudiit	13.1%	1,564	1,439	▴	0.58%
140107010	Namit-ingan	3.4%	406	617	▾	−2.86%
140107011	Pacac	3.8%	459	605	▾	−1.90%
140107012	Poblacion	17.6%	2,105	2,257	▾	−0.48%
140107013	Salucag	3.3%	394	551	▾	−2.30%
140107014	Talogtog	10.5%	1,254	1,162	▴	0.53%
140107015	Taping	3.5%	417	425	▾	−0.13%
	Total		11,967	11,512	▴	0.27%

=== Climate ===
Climate data for Dolores, Abra
Month	Jan	Feb	Mar	Apr	May	Jun	Jul	Aug	Sep	Oct	Nov	Dec	Year
Mean daily maximum °C (°F)	27 (81)	28 (82)	30 (86)	32 (90)	31 (88)	31 (88)	30 (86)	30 (86)	30 (86)	29 (84)	29 (84)	27 (81)	30 (85)
Mean daily minimum °C (°F)	19 (66)	20 (68)	21 (70)	23 (73)	24 (75)	25 (77)	24 (75)	24 (75)	24 (75)	22 (72)	22 (72)	20 (68)	22 (72)
Average precipitation mm (inches)	24 (0.9)	26 (1.0)	25 (1.0)	43 (1.7)	159 (6.3)	180 (7.1)	204 (8.0)	207 (8.1)	183 (7.2)	185 (7.3)	91 (3.6)	67 (2.6)	1,394 (54.8)
Average rainy days	8.2	8.7	10.1	13.7	22.3	24.3	25.3	23.5	22.2	16.4	14.1	12.7	201.5
Source: Meteoblue

== Demographics ==
Population census of Dolores
Year	Pop.	±% p.a.
1903	4,379	—
1918	7,061	+3.24%
1939	4,845	−1.78%
1948	4,065	−1.93%
1960	5,065	+1.85%
1970	6,751	+2.91%
1975	6,767	+0.05%
1980	7,615	+2.39%
1990	8,577	+1.20%
1995	9,560	+2.05%
2000	9,949	+0.86%
2007	10,787	+1.12%
2010	11,499	+2.35%
2015	11,315	−0.31%
2020	11,512	+0.36%
2024	11,967	+0.93%
Source: Philippine Statistics Authority

In the 2024 census, Dolores had a population of 11,967 people. The population density was 250 inhabitants per square kilometre (650/sq mi).

== Economy ==
Poverty incidence of Dolores (%)

Source: Philippine Statistics Authority

The economy of the municipality focuses primarily on agriculture, local micro-enterprises, and traditional cottage industries. The DTI established 11th Negosyo Center in Dolores to raise enterprises. The local development programs of the municipality promote advanced loom weaving to boost cultural influence.

== Government ==
=== Local government ===
Dolores, belonging to the lone congressional district of the province of Abra, is governed by a mayor designated as its local chief executive and by a municipal council as its legislative body in accordance with the Local Government Code. The mayor, vice mayor, and the councilors are elected directly by the people through an election which is being held every three years.

=== Elected officials ===
Members of the Municipal Council (2025–2028)
Position	Name
Congressman	Joseph Santo Niño B. Bernos
Mayor	Conde T. Turqueza
Vice-Mayor	Russ Marion T. Zapata
Councilors	Frederick D. Pilorin
Councilors	David B. Guzman Jr.
Councilors	Ronnel B. Tordil
Councilors	Robert P. Ardaniel
Councilors	Rodelio R. Pudol
Councilors	Joel C. Palma
Councilors	Emelito T. Cortez
Councilors	Clint Chester B. Guzman

== Education ==
The Dolores Schools District Office governs all educational institutions within the municipality. It oversees the management and operations of all private and public, from primary to secondary schools.

=== Primary and elementary schools ===
- Cabaroan Elementary School
- Cardona Elementary School
- Dolores Central School
- Don Rosalio Eduarte Elementary School
- Kimmalaba Elementary School
- Mudiit Elementary School
- Pacac Elementary School
- Taping Elementary School
- Libtec Elementary School
- Lourdes Zapata Primary School

=== Secondary school ===
- Rosalio Eduarte National High School
