= Panagbenga Festival =

Annual festival in Baguio, Philippines

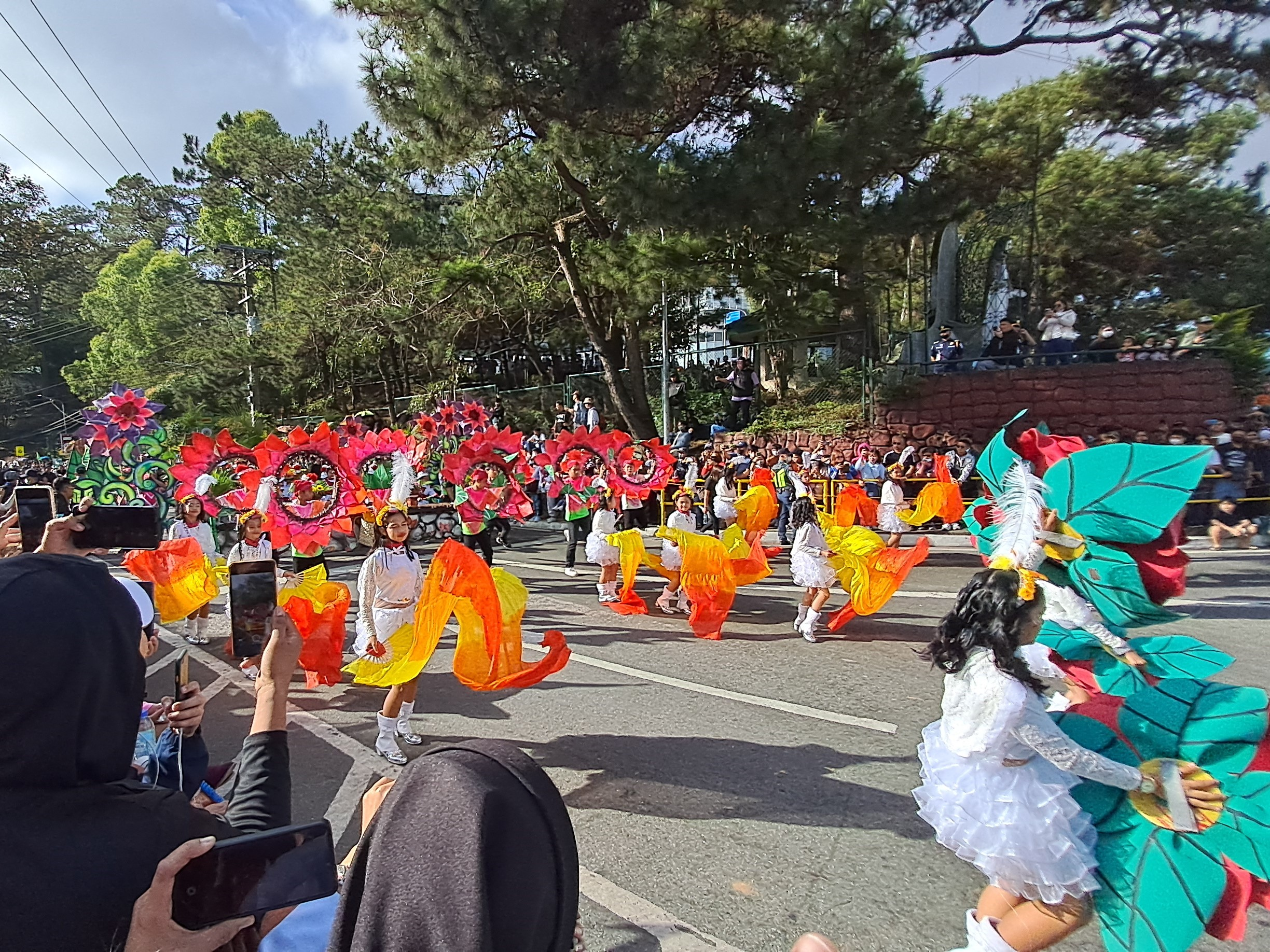
- Street parade at the Panagbenga Festival in 2023
- Begins: February 1
- Ends: First Sunday in March
- Venue: Panagbenga Park; Harrison Road; Baguio Athletic Bowl; Session Road
- Location: Baguio
- Country: Philippines
- Inaugurated: February 1996; 30 years ago

The Panagbenga Festival (Kankanaey pronunciation: [pʌnʌɡ̚ˈbɨŋʌ]; Ilocano pronunciation: [pɐnɐgˈbɯŋa]), also called the Baguio Flower Festival, is a month-long annual flower occasion in Baguio, Philippines. The festival, held in February, was created as a tribute to the city's flowers and as a way to rise from devastation of the 1990 Luzon earthquake. The festival includes floats that are covered mostly with flowers. The festival also includes street dancing, presented by dancers in costumes such as bahag in male and floral for female, that is inspired by the Bendian, an Ibaloi dance of celebration that came from the Cordilleras.

== Etymology ==
The term is of Kankanaey origin, meaning "season of blooming".

== History ==
In 1995, lawyer Damaso E. Bangaoet, Jr. (1940–2014), then a managing director for Camp John Hay, proposed a flower festival to the board of directors of John Hay Poro Point Development Corporation. The City of Baguio was known for its flowers, but most of these actually come from nearby La Trinidad, the provincial capital of the province of Benguet. The festival was set in February to boost tourism as it was considered as a time of inactivity between the busy days of the Christmas season, Holy Week, and the summer season.

The first edition of the festival, once known as the Baguio Flower Festival, was formally launched in February 1996. By the end of 1996, archivist and curator Ike Picpican suggested that the festival be renamed Panagbenga, a Kankanaey term that means "a season of blossoming, a time for flowering". Subsequent editions of the festival started bearing the new name by 1997.

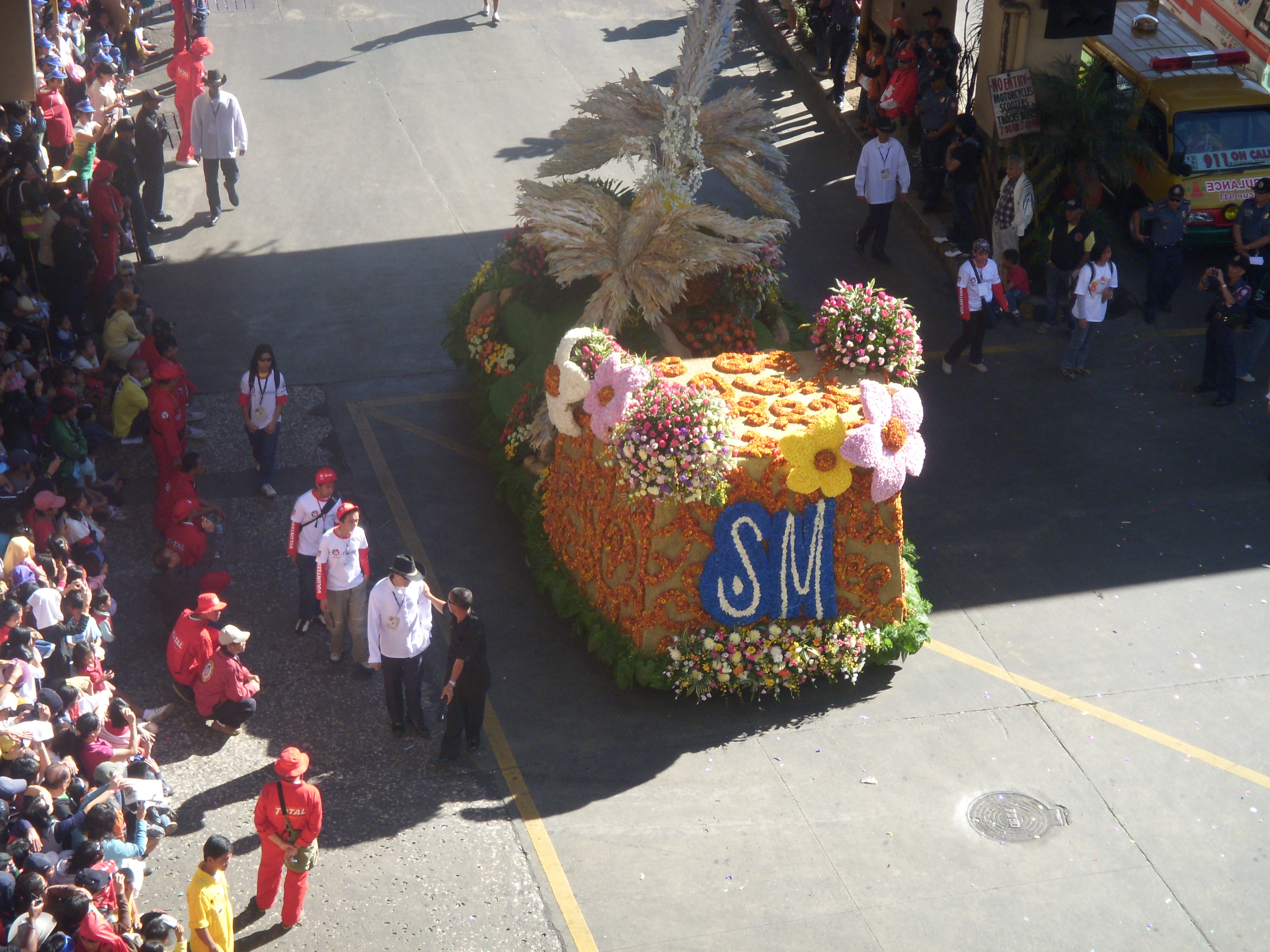
A typical float at the Panagbenga Festival in 2009

The Bases Conversion Development Authority (BCDA), in collaboration with the John Hay Poro Point Development Corporation's (JPDC) annual Camp John Hay Art Contest, gave its official logo from one of the entries: a spray of indigenous sunflowers from an artwork submitted by Trisha Tabangin, a student of the Baguio City National High School.

Panagbenga festivities were cancelled in 2020 and 2021 due to the COVID-19 pandemic. On March 6, 2022, the festival returned with limited events that were exclusively funded by private donors, as government funds were directed towards ongoing COVID relief. By 2023, all festival events, including street dancing and float parades, resumed.

The 2024 Grand Float Parade featured a record of 34 flower floats from Session Road to the Melvin Jones Grandstand in Burnham Park with 29 competitors in various categories amid estimated 32,000 local and foreign tourists. Lucban Elementary School and Tribu Rizal (Rizal, Kalinga) are winners in the Grand Street Dance Competition. Everlasting (Xerochrysum bracteatum) and sunflower are the city’s official flowers.

== Activities ==
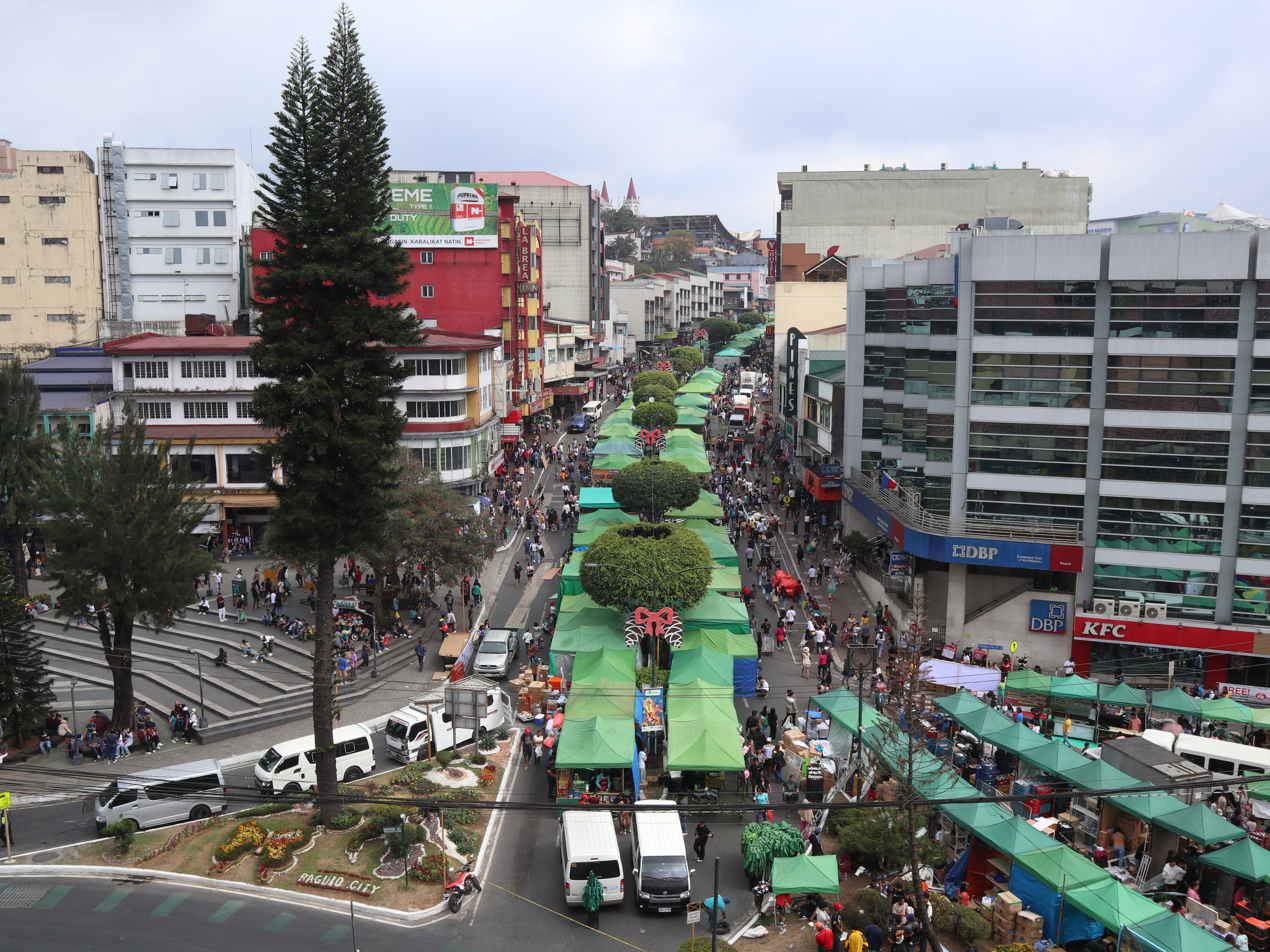
Session Road in February 2024 for the "Session in Bloom" activities

The month-long festival starts on the first day of February with an opening parade. Activities celebrated throughout the month include a landscape competition and cultural shows; street dancing and float parades during the last week of February draw huge crowds. After the parade, Session Road is closed for a week for the Session Road in Bloom activity which hosts a variety of stalls showcasing products locally and from other provinces. The festival concludes in the first weekend in March with a grand fireworks display.

== Controversies ==
In February 2025, festival organizers banned senators Imee Marcos and Lito Lapid from participating in future editions of the Panagbenga Festival. Marcos and Lapid participated in the Grand Float Parade but were later caught for violating campaigning prohibitions for the 2025 Philippine general election. The float that Marcos rode also allegedly failed to comply with the campaigning ban.
