= Luba, Abra =

Municipality in Abra, Philippines

Luba
- Municipality
- Municipality of Luba
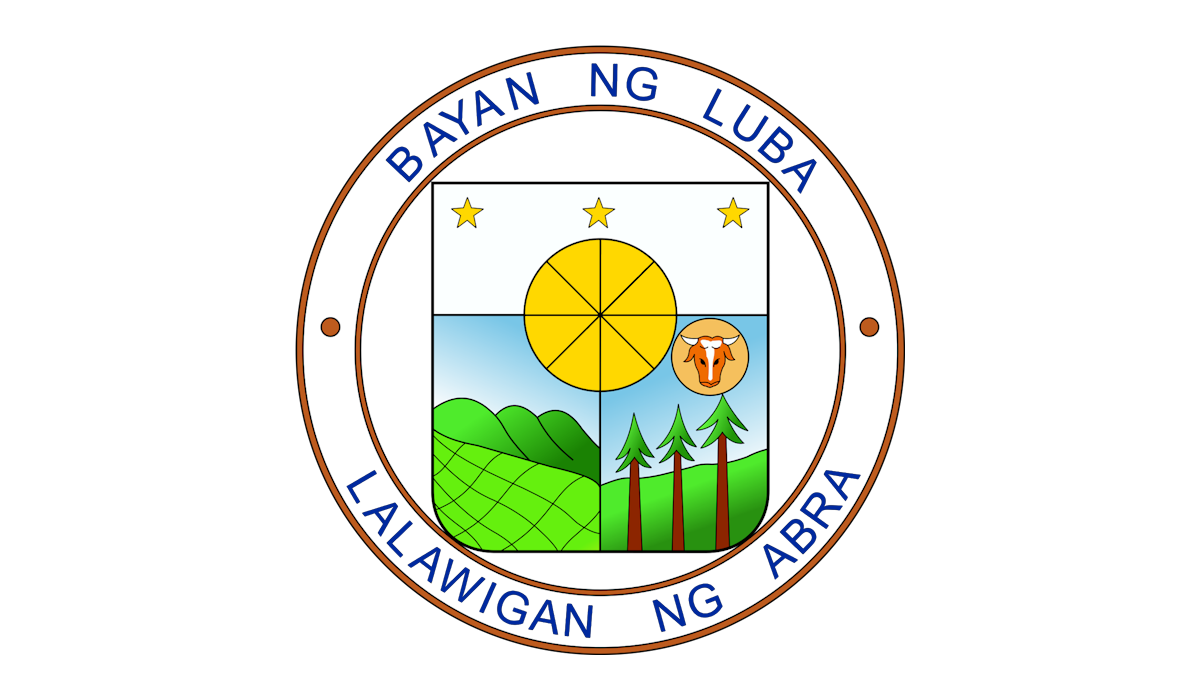
- Flag Seal

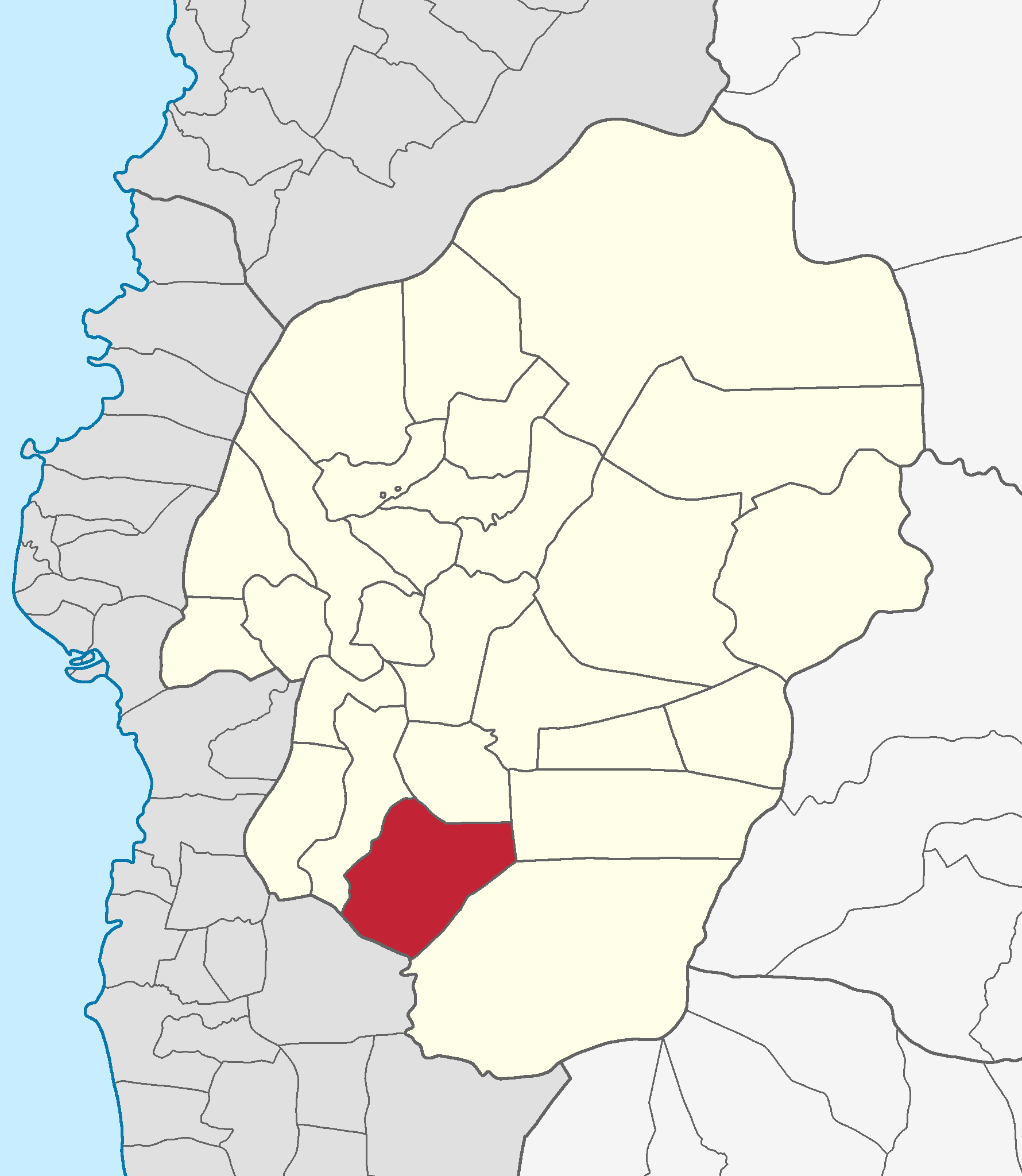
- Map of Abra with Luba highlighted
- Interactive map of Luba
- Location within the Philippines
- Coordinates: 17°19′N 120°42′E
- Country: Philippines
- Region: Cordillera Administrative Region
- Province: Abra
- District: Lone district
- Founded: 1912
- Barangays: 8 (see Barangays)

Government
  - Type: Sangguniang Bayan
  - Mayor: Emirald V. Baculi
  - Vice Mayor: Rogelio A. Biscarra
  - Representative: Joseph Santo Niño B. Bernos
  - Municipal Council: Members: Crisma Vebs V. Quiblado; Rosielyn P. Pioig; Bernie B. Masadao; Neru B. Baculi; Roden B. Daoaten; Rosalina C. Biscarra; Junel B. Dacquel; Joven R. Lang-ayan Sr.
  - Electorate: 4,928 voters (2025)

Area
  - Total: 148.27 km^{2} (57.25 sq mi)
- Elevation: 421 m (1,381 ft)
- Highest elevation: 861 m (2,825 ft)
- Lowest elevation: 143 m (469 ft)

Population (2024 census)
  - Total: 6,402
  - Density: 43.18/km^{2} (111.8/sq mi)
  - Households: 1,462

Economy
  - Income class: 1st municipal income class
  - Poverty incidence: 10.26% (2023)
  - Revenue: ₱ 226 million (2024)
  - Assets: ₱ 472.1 million (2024)
  - Expenditure: ₱ 187 million (2024)
  - Liabilities: ₱ 93.4 million (2024)

Service provider
  - Electricity: Abra Electric Cooperative (ABRECO)
- Time zone: UTC+8 (PST)
- ZIP code: 2813
- PSGC: 1400114000
- IDD : area code: +63 (0)74
- Native languages: Itneg; Ilocano; Tagalog

Luba, officially the Municipality of Luba (Ilocano: Ili ti Luba; Maeng Itneg: Ili di Luba; Tagalog: Bayan ng Luba), is a municipality in the province of Abra, Philippines. According to the 2024 census, it has a population of 6,402 people.

== History ==
The earliest known settlement in the municipality of Luba was in Barit. It was then a thickly forested area with tall and big trees interconnected with myriads of rattan vines called barit. The early settlers were hunters as the place was abundant with wild pigs, deer and fruit trees.

The home of fine quality of rattan, Barit increased in population so that another settlement in a nearby place emerged. They called this Barit-Luzong. Southwest of Barit, another settlement occurred and they called this Barit-Lulluno. Barit-Amtuagan soon followed. It is only after a considerable period of time that the settlement of Bancagan (now the capital of the municipality) took place. The old folks has it that the river banks were being avoided due to the presence of crocodiles called buaya. But in the middle part of the 18th century, settlements near river banks begun to flourish. Half a century earlier, settlers from the uplands had turned to slash and burn farming, which almost dissipated the premium hardwood trees. As a consequence, flash floods occurred that resulted in siltation of the deep river bed portion, virtually neutralizing the hiding place of the crocodiles. Exposed to attack, their numbers were kept to a minimum.

The first formal collective name of the municipality of Luba was Barit-Amtuagan, presumably to include all other settlers from the east side of the karayan (river). This is located south east of Barit near the Damalin River, the biggest tributary of the Abra river. After sometime, some influential leaders from Barit-Lulluno had caused the transfer of collective capital from Barit-Amtuagan to Barit-Lulluno. For many years, Barit-Lulluno lingered until the onset of the American Regime.

In 1917 or probably earlier, the name of Luba was formally adopted as the official name of the municipality. Accordingly, it was a fusion of the first two letters of Lulluno and Barit.

The Municipality Luba was founded in 1912 or probably earlier, the name finally appearing in the population census in 1918. One and a half centuries earlier, the core settlement at Barit gradually transformed into a pueblo in the middle part of the 18th century and believed to be a part of the military district of Villavieja.

The first capital of the town and seat of the municipal government was in Luzong, 4 km away from the original settlement at Barit. But in 1920, Caoatig Valera, the third presidente of the municipality of Luba transferred the town capital to Bancagan (now Poblacion) in answer to the clamor of some influential people in that sitio.

Luba now consist of eight barangays scattered in a 20,850-hectare territory with an average of 3 km apart. It has two valleys: the upper and the lower. The town's geographical location has been a major factor in her slow-paced development that she is often tagged as a marginalized community of Abra.

== Geography ==
The municipality is located at the southern part of Abra at located at 17°19′N 120°42′E. It is bounded on the north by the municipality of Manabo; north-east by Boliney; east by Tubo; south by San Emilio, and west by Villaviciosa. According to the Philippine Statistics Authority, the municipality has a land area of 148.27 square kilometres (57.25 sq mi) constituting 3.56% of the 4,165.25-square-kilometre- (1,608.21 sq mi) total area of Abra.

Luba is situated 48.46 kilometres (30.11 mi) from the provincial capital Bangued, and 403.24 kilometres (250.56 mi) from the country's capital city of Manila.

=== Accessibility ===
Luba is accessible from Benguet/Baguio by vehicle via the Naguilian Road down to San Fernando City, traversing the province of Ilocos Sur to the municipality of Narvacan, then continuing to Bangued. The Bangued–Luba route is seasonal for vehicular traffic (November–June). However the Bangued–Salnec Bucay Road is an all-weather one, and an intermittent section along the Manabo-Luba Road is not passable during typhoons/storms, so the only way to go to and from the town is by crossing the Abra River twice.

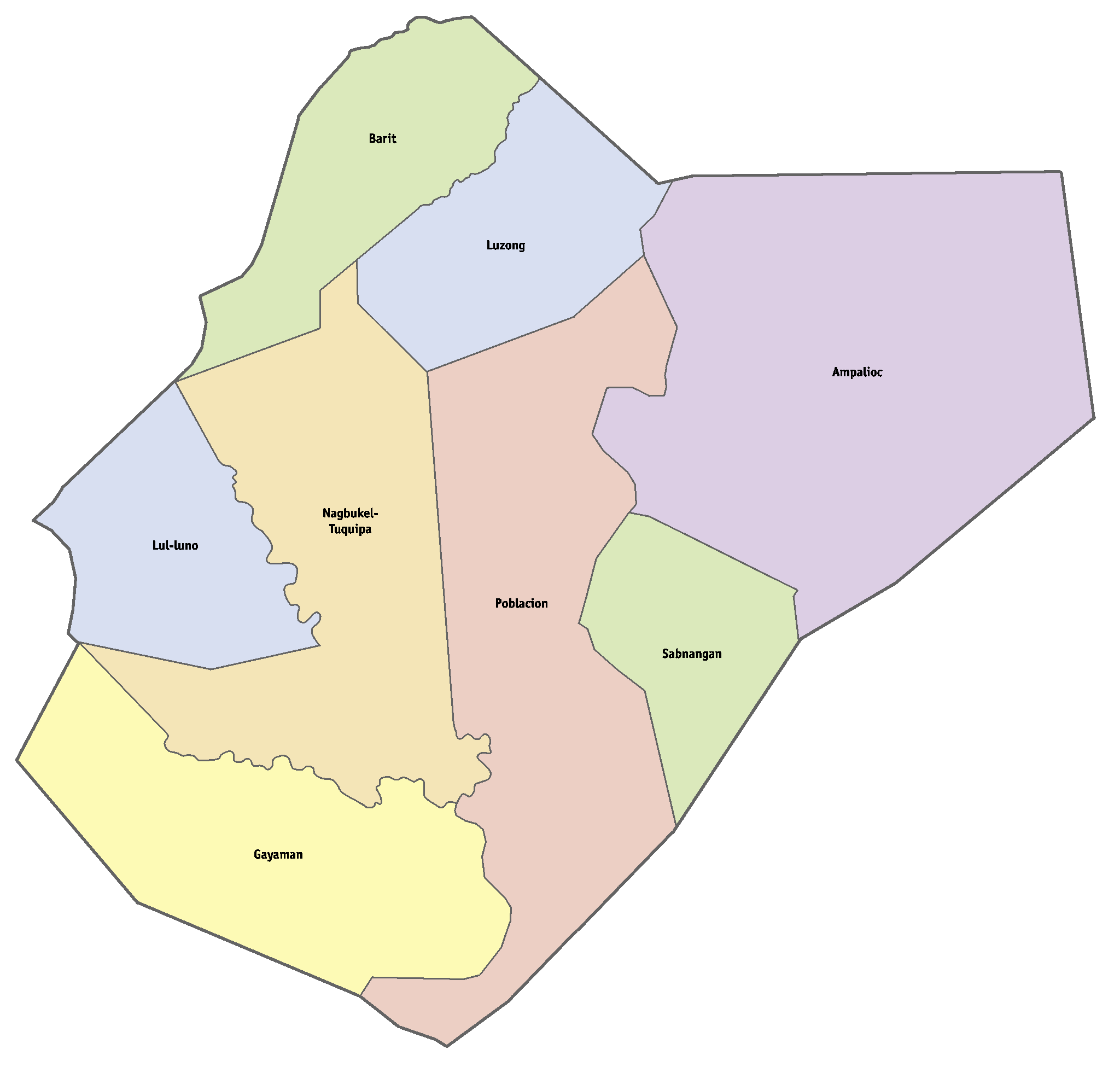
Political map of Luba

=== Barangays ===
Luba is politically subdivided into eight barangays. Each barangay consists of puroks and some have sitios.

| PSGC | Barangay | Population | | | ±% p.a. | |
| | | 2024 | | 2010 | | |
|---|---|---|---|---|---|---|
| 140114001 | Ampalioc | 20.0% | 1,282 | 1,177 | ▴ | 0.59% |
| 140114002 | Barit | 10.0% | 639 | 572 | ▴ | 0.77% |
| 140114003 | Gayaman | 16.0% | 1,026 | 1,020 | ▴ | 0.04% |
| 140114005 | Lul-luno | 6.1% | 388 | 379 | ▴ | 0.16% |
| 140114006 | Luzong | 14.3% | 913 | 920 | ▾ | −0.05% |
| 140114007 | Nagbukel-Tuquipa | 8.6% | 552 | 534 | ▴ | 0.23% |
| 140114008 | Poblacion | 17.5% | 1,119 | 1,128 | ▾ | −0.06% |
| 140114009 | Sabnangan | 9.4% | 599 | 661 | ▾ | −0.68% |
| | Total | | 6,402 | 6,518 | ▾ | −0.12% |

=== Climate ===
Climate data for Luba, Abra
| Month | Jan | Feb | Mar | Apr | May | Jun | Jul | Aug | Sep | Oct | Nov | Dec | Year |
|---|---|---|---|---|---|---|---|---|---|---|---|---|---|
| Mean daily maximum °C (°F) | 29 (84) | 30 (86) | 32 (90) | 33 (91) | 31 (88) | 30 (86) | 29 (84) | 29 (84) | 29 (84) | 30 (86) | 30 (86) | 29 (84) | 30 (86) |
| Mean daily minimum °C (°F) | 18 (64) | 18 (64) | 20 (68) | 22 (72) | 24 (75) | 24 (75) | 23 (73) | 23 (73) | 23 (73) | 21 (70) | 20 (68) | 18 (64) | 21 (70) |
| Average precipitation mm (inches) | 10 (0.4) | 10 (0.4) | 14 (0.6) | 23 (0.9) | 80 (3.1) | 103 (4.1) | 121 (4.8) | 111 (4.4) | 119 (4.7) | 114 (4.5) | 39 (1.5) | 15 (0.6) | 759 (30) |
| Average rainy days | 5.2 | 3.9 | 6.2 | 9.1 | 18.5 | 21.4 | 22.9 | 19.8 | 19.8 | 16.2 | 10.5 | 6.1 | 159.6 |
Source: Meteoblue

== Demographics ==
Population census of Luba
| Year | Pop. | ±% p.a. |
|---|---|---|
| 1918 | 2,254 | — |
| 1939 | 2,414 | +0.33% |
| 1948 | 2,276 | −0.65% |
| 1960 | 3,710 | +4.16% |
| 1970 | 5,666 | +4.32% |
| 1975 | 4,712 | −3.63% |
| 1980 | 4,911 | +0.83% |
| 1990 | 5,563 | +1.25% |
| 1995 | 5,559 | −0.01% |
| 2000 | 6,203 | +2.38% |
| 2007 | 6,363 | +0.35% |
| 2010 | 6,391 | +0.16% |
| 2015 | 6,339 | −0.16% |
| 2020 | 6,518 | +0.59% |
| 2024 | 6,402 | −0.43% |
Source: Philippine Statistics Authority

In the 2024 census, Luba had a population of 6,402 people. The population density was 43 inhabitants per square kilometre (110/sq mi).

== Economy ==
Poverty incidence of Luba (%)

Source: Philippine Statistics Authority

Luba's economy is primarily grounded in agriculture. The key agricultural staples of Luba are rice and corn. There are also local communal irrigation developments like the Minal Communal Irrigation System. The local farmers of Luba are actively engaging in cooperative enterprises such as the Hillside Agriculture Cooperative. The Hillside Agriculture Cooperative processes sugarcane products like pure sugarcane vinegar.

== Government ==
=== Local government ===
Luba, belonging to the lone congressional district of the province of Abra, is governed by a mayor designated as its local chief executive and by a municipal council as its legislative body in accordance with the Local Government Code. The mayor, vice mayor, and the councilors are elected directly by the people through an election which is being held every three years.

=== Elected officials ===
Members of the Municipal Council (2025–2028)
| Position | Name |
|---|---|
| Congressman | Joseph Santo Niño B. Bernos |
| Mayor | Emirald V. Baculi |
| Vice-Mayor | Rogelio A. Biscarra |
| Councilors | Bernie B. Masadao |
| Councilors | Roden B. Daoaten |
| Councilors | Rosielyn P. Pioig |
| Councilors | Rosalina C. Biscarra |
| Councilors | Neru B. Baculi |
| Councilors | Crisma Vebs V. Quiblado |
| Councilors | Junel B. Dacquel |
| Councilors | Joven R. Lang-ayan, Sr. |

== Education ==
The Luba Schools District Office governs all educational institutions within the municipality. It oversees the management and operations of all private and public, from primary to secondary schools.

=== Primary and elementary schools ===
- Agumanay Elementary School
- Ampalioc Primary School
- Barit Elementary School
- Botot Elementary School
- Gayaman Elementary School
- Lipting Primary School
- Luba Central School
- Lul-luno Elementary School
- Luzong Elementary School
- Pacpaca Elementary School
- Pega Primary School
- Sabnangan Elementary School
- Tillilo Primary School
- Tukipa Primary School

=== Secondary schools ===
- Lul-luno National High School
- Luzong National High School
- Tabangao Integrated School
