= Tubo, Abra =

Municipality in Abra, Philippines

Tubo
- Municipality
- Municipality of Tubo
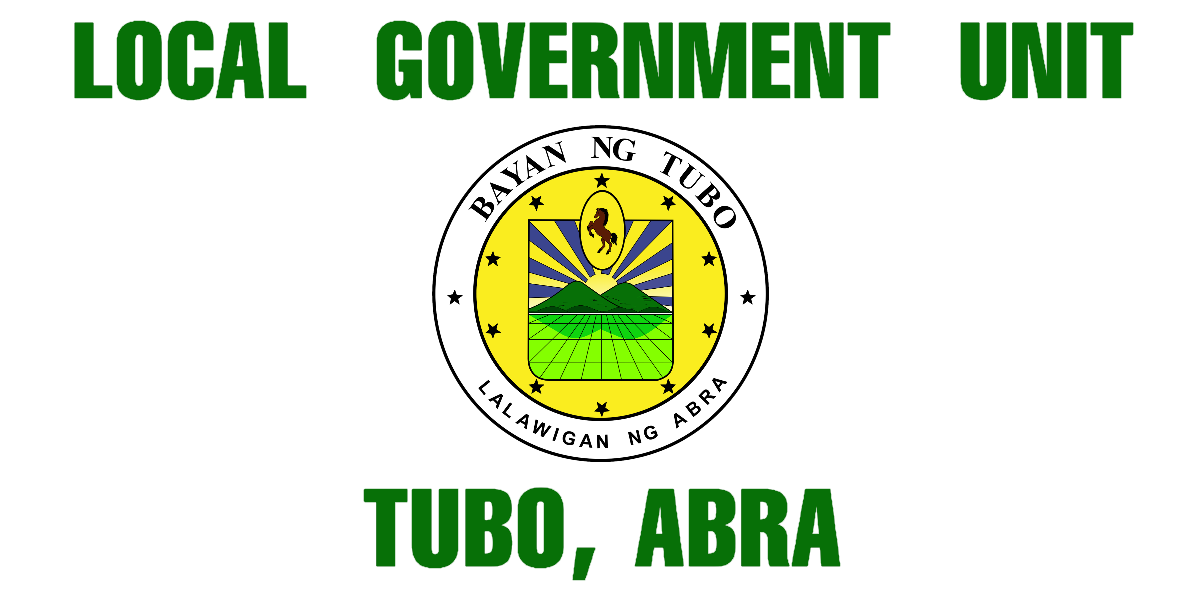
- Flag Seal

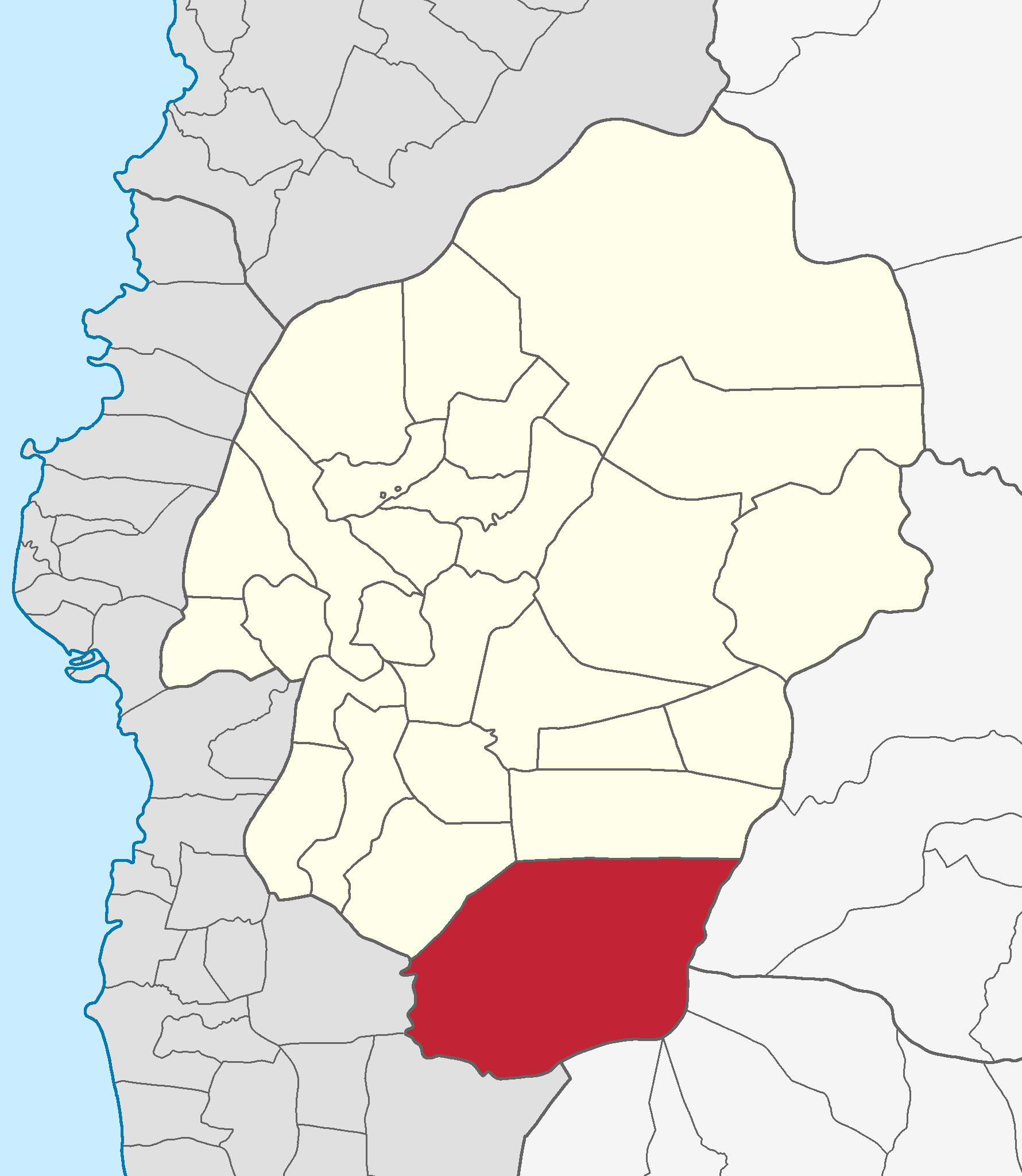
- Map of Abra with Tubo highlighted
- Interactive map of Tubo
- Location within the Philippines
- Coordinates: 17°16′N 120°44′E
- Country: Philippines
- Region: Cordillera Administrative Region
- Province: Abra
- District: Lone district
- Barangays: 10 (see Barangays)

Government
  - Type: Sangguniang Bayan
  - Mayor: Liberty B. La-os
  - Vice Mayor: Guilbert P. Ballangan
  - Representative: Joseph Santo Niño B. Bernos
  - Municipal Council: Members: Florentino W. Patil-ao Jr.; Marcelino B. Pe Benito Sr.; Nomer B. Macario; Saulo A. del Rosario Jr.; Joseph B. Cagod; Benjamin N. Dawala; Elmer C. Alem; Thomas B. Lawagan
  - Electorate: 3,956 voters (2025)

Area
  - Total: 409.87 km^{2} (158.25 sq mi)
- Elevation: 576 m (1,890 ft)
- Highest elevation: 1,422 m (4,665 ft)
- Lowest elevation: 168 m (551 ft)

Population (2024 census)
  - Total: 4,941
  - Density: 12.06/km^{2} (31.22/sq mi)
  - Households: 1,028

Economy
  - Income class: 2nd municipal income class
  - Poverty incidence: 16.19% (2023)
  - Revenue: ₱ 204.8 million (2024)
  - Assets: ₱ 556.5 million (2024)
  - Expenditure: ₱ 162.3 million (2024)
  - Liabilities: ₱ 80.73 million (2024)

Service provider
  - Electricity: Abra Electric Cooperative (ABRECO)
- Time zone: UTC+8 (PST)
- ZIP code: 2814
- PSGC: 1400126000
- IDD : area code: +63 (0)74
- Native languages: Itneg; Ilocano; Tagalog

Tubo, officially the Municipality of Tubo (Ilocano: Ili ti Tubo; Maeng Itneg: Ili di Tubo; Tagalog: Bayan ng Tubo), is a municipality in the province of Abra, Philippines. According to the 2024 census, it has a population of 4,941 people.

== History ==
The municipality was created on June 17, 1967, from the former municipal district of the same name, through Republic Act 5161.

=== Beew massacre ===
On May 6, 1983, Sitio Beew in Tubo was the site of several attacks by the 623rd Philippine Constabulary (623rd PC) led by Captain Berido, Lt. Rehaldo Lebua and Lt. Juanito Puyawan, which would collectively come to be known as the "Beew Massacre." The 623rd PC burned down four houses and a rice granary, which still contained the remains of three villagers including an unborn baby, and Barangay Councilman Rodolfo Labawig, pregnant mother Josefina Cayandag, and her unborn child. Beew residents, including babies and toddlers, were beaten and their houses looted in response to the residents' alleged support of protests against the logging operations of Herminio Disini's Cellophil Resources Corporation in their area.

The residents fled to Sagada where they took refuge in the Church of the St. Mary. There, they were given succor by Fr. Paul Sagayo Jr. until they could finally be aided by Atty Pablo Sanidad of the Free Legal Assistance Group and journalist Isidoro Chammag of the Bulletin Today.

The government denied the incident and filed a case against Chammag, but the Baguio Press supported Chammag and launched the "Piso para kay Chammag" campaign to raise bail for him. The charges were later dismissed, and Chammag's became a landmark case in Philippine Jurisprudence.

== Geography ==
According to the Philippine Statistics Authority, the municipality has a land area of 409.87 square kilometres (158.25 sq mi) constituting 9.84% of the 4,165.25-square-kilometre- (1,608.21 sq mi) total area of Abra. Tubo is located at 17°16′N 120°44′E.

The Municipality of Tubo can be reached through various routes. Coming from Bangued, the place can be reached by passing through the towns of Peñarrubia-Bucay-Manabo and Luba. It could also be reached via Candon-San Emilio and Tagudin-Quirino of the nearby province of Ilocos Sur, or via Besao of Mountain Province or Kalinga. Unfortunately, no road links exist herein.

The town is at the southern tip of Abra. It is bounded on the west by Ilocos Sur and Luba, Abra, north by Boliney, east by Kalinga and Mountain Province, and south by Mountain Province and Ilocos Sur.

Tubo is situated 60.27 kilometres (37.45 mi) from the provincial capital Bangued, and 392.05 kilometres (243.61 mi) from the country's capital city of Manila.

=== Barangays ===
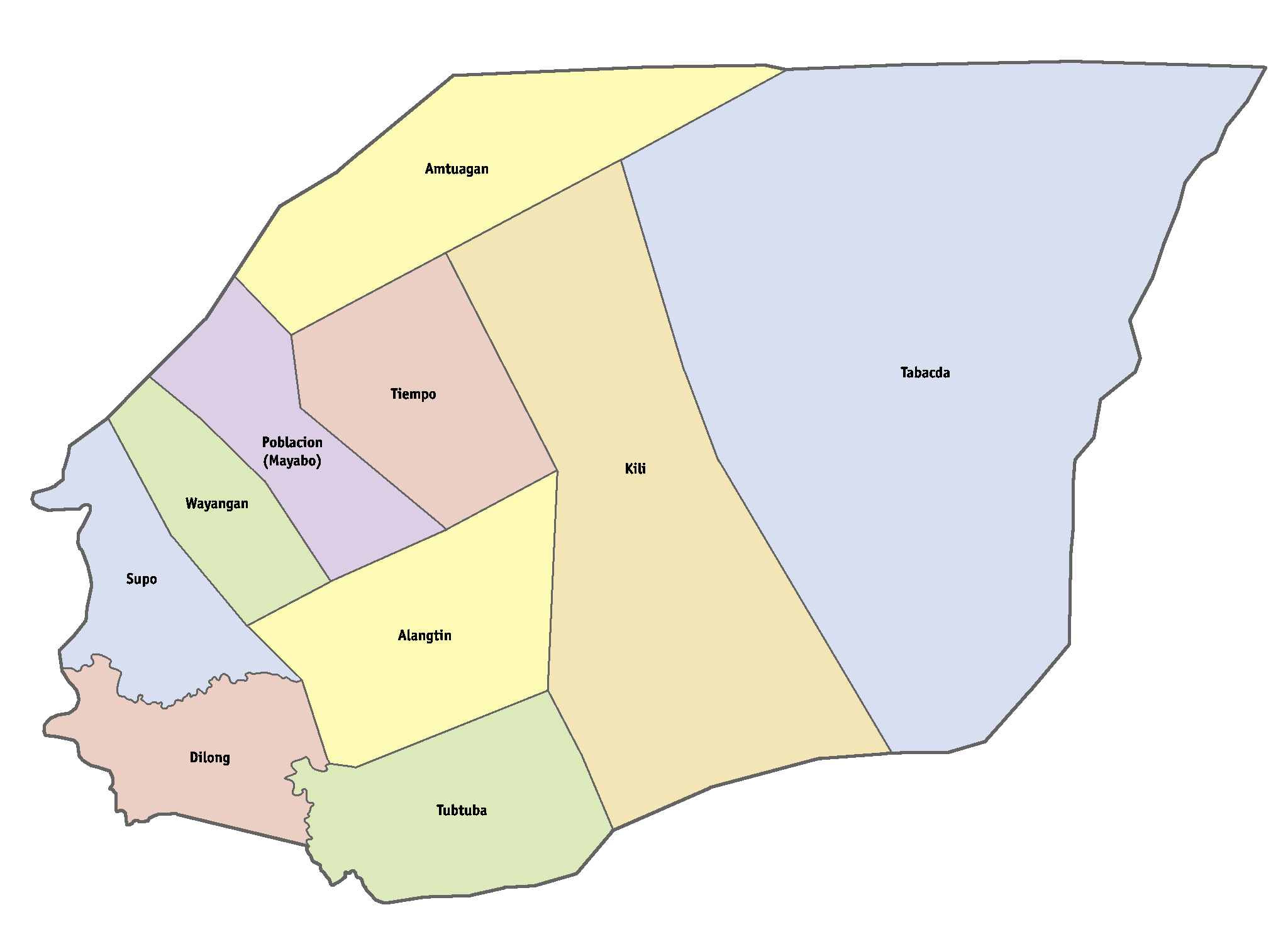
Political map of Tubo

Tubo is politically subdivided into 10 barangays. Each barangay consists of puroks and some have sitios.

PSGC	Barangay	Population			±% p.a.	
		2024		2010		
140126001	Alangtin	11.6%	571	650	▾	−0.89%
140126002	Amtuagan	10.5%	519	494	▴	0.34%
140126003	Dilong	14.9%	735	818	▾	−0.74%
140126004	Kili	8.7%	431	426	▴	0.08%
140126005	Poblacion (Mayabo)	11.8%	584	582	▴	0.02%
140126006	Supo	15.8%	779	732	▴	0.43%
140126010	Tabacda	5.7%	284	246	▴	1.00%
140126007	Tiempo	17.4%	862	800	▴	0.52%
140126008	Tubtuba	8.7%	431	491	▾	−0.90%
140126009	Wayangan	9.7%	478	480	▾	−0.03%
	Total		4,941	5,674	▾	−0.95%

The 10 barangays are grouped into three (3) zones:

- Zone 1: Poblacion (Mayabo), Wayangan and Supo
- Zone 2: Tiempo, Kili, Tabacda and Amtuagan
- Zone 3: Alangtin-Batayan, Tubtuba and Dilong

=== Climate ===
Climate data for Tubo, Abra
Month	Jan	Feb	Mar	Apr	May	Jun	Jul	Aug	Sep	Oct	Nov	Dec	Year
Mean daily maximum °C (°F)	26 (79)	27 (81)	29 (84)	31 (88)	30 (86)	30 (86)	29 (84)	29 (84)	29 (84)	28 (82)	27 (81)	26 (79)	28 (83)
Mean daily minimum °C (°F)	18 (64)	19 (66)	20 (68)	22 (72)	23 (73)	24 (75)	23 (73)	23 (73)	23 (73)	21 (70)	21 (70)	20 (68)	21 (70)
Average precipitation mm (inches)	23 (0.9)	28 (1.1)	33 (1.3)	64 (2.5)	232 (9.1)	242 (9.5)	258 (10.2)	266 (10.5)	245 (9.6)	201 (7.9)	87 (3.4)	69 (2.7)	1,748 (68.7)
Average rainy days	8.3	8.0	10.8	15.2	23.7	26.1	27.0	25.8	23.5	17.3	13.7	12.1	211.5
Source: Meteoblue

== Demographics ==
Population census of Tubo
Year	Pop.	±% p.a.
1918	2,022	—
1939	3,041	+1.96%
1948	1,981	−4.65%
1960	4,198	+6.46%
1970	4,386	+0.44%
1975	4,018	−1.74%
1980	4,985	+4.41%
1990	4,589	−0.82%
1995	4,344	−1.02%
2000	5,044	+3.25%
2007	5,588	+1.42%
2010	5,719	+0.85%
2015	5,699	−0.07%
2020	5,674	−0.09%
2024	4,941	−3.27%
Source: Philippine Statistics Authority

The inhabitants belong to the Maeng tribe and speak a dialect of the same name; however, the barangay Tabacda speaks a different dialect, as they are believed to have originated from Kalinga and Mountain Province. Everyone can understand and speak the common evolving dialect called Maeng together with those of Luba and parts of Villavicioa of the Province of Abra and likewise in the other municipalities of the Province of Ilocos Sur, who call themselves the Bago tribe.

Agriculture is the main source of livelihood, though various industries are starting to grow.

All barangays and their respective sitios have dirt roads leading to them but can still become accessible via trails permanently established even during the Spanish era. Electricity is available except in only one barangay and two sitios. The relative nearness of the three barangays of Dilong, Tubtuba and Alangtin to the Province of Ilocos Sur provided them the privilege of being served by ISECO while all others remaining are served by ABRECO.

In the 2024 census, Tubo had a population of 4,941 people. The population density was 12 inhabitants per square kilometre (31/sq mi).

== Economy ==
Poverty incidence of Tubo (%)

Source: Philippine Statistics Authority

The main source of economy in Tubo is agriculture. The agriculture of Tubo was boosted by cooperative programs and machinery grants.

== Government ==
=== Local government ===
Tubo, belonging to the lone congressional district of the province of Abra, is governed by a mayor designated as its local chief executive and by a municipal council as its legislative body in accordance with the Local Government Code. The mayor, vice mayor, and the councilors are elected directly by the people through an election which is being held every three years.

=== Elected officials ===
Members of the Municipal Council (2025–2028)
Position	Name
Congresswoman	Joseph Santo Niño B. Bernos
Mayor	Liberty B. La-os
Vice-Mayor	Guilbert P. Ballangan
Councilors	Florentino W. Patil-ao Jr.
Councilors	Nomer B. Macario
Councilors	Joseph B. Cagod
Councilors	Elmer C. Alem
Councilors	Saulo A. Del Rosario Jr.
Councilors	Benjamin N. Dawala
Councilors	Thomas B. Lawagan
Councilors	Marcelino B. Pe Benito Sr.

== Education ==
The Tubo Schools District Office governs all educational institutions within the municipality. It oversees the management and operations of all private and public, from primary to secondary schools.

=== Primary and elementary schools ===
- Alangtin Elementary School
- Amtuagan Elementary School
- Batayan Primary School
- Caocaoayan Primary School
- Dacuag Primary School
- Dilong Elementary School
- Kili Elementary School
- Likowan Primary School
- Pananuman Primary School
- Supo Elementary School
- Tabacda Primary School
- Tiempo Elementary School
- Tubo Central School
- Tubtuba Elementary School
- Wayangan Elementary School

=== Secondary schools ===
- Dilong National High School
- Supo National High School
- Tiempo National High School
