= Manabo =

Municipality in Abra, Philippines

- Municipality
- Municipality of Manabo
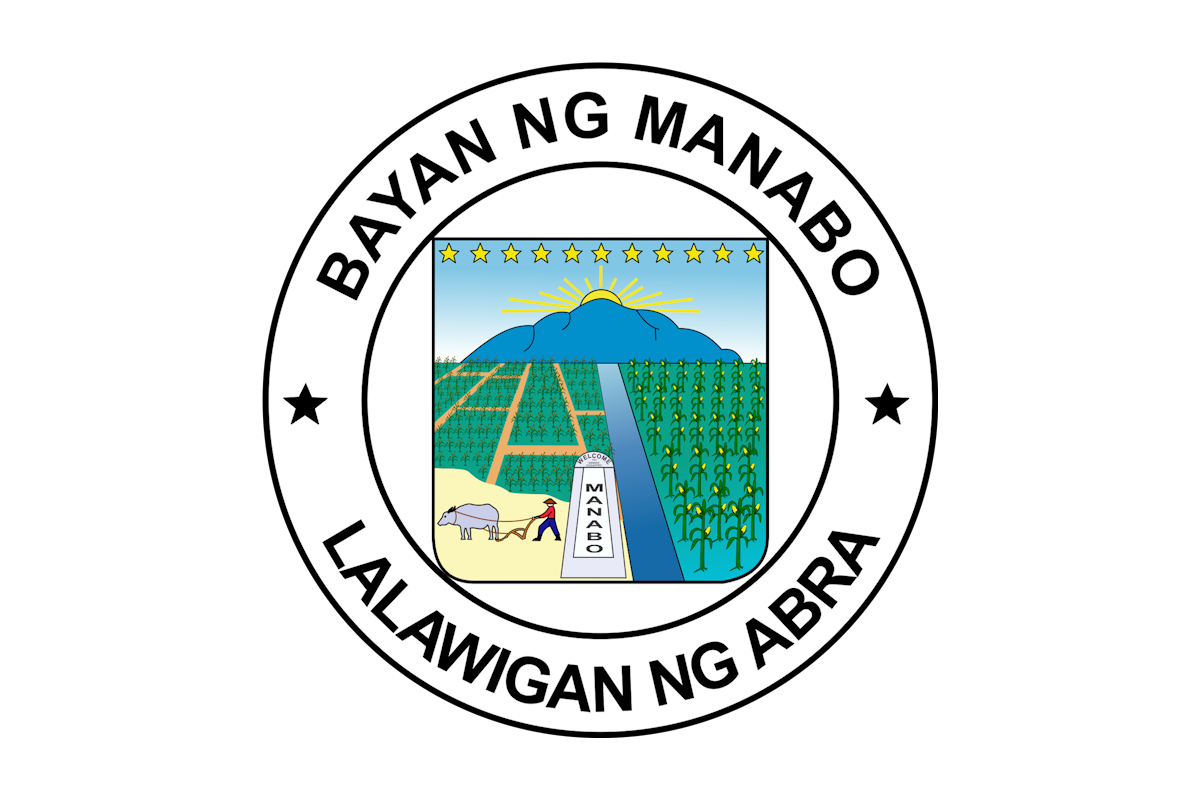
- Flag Seal

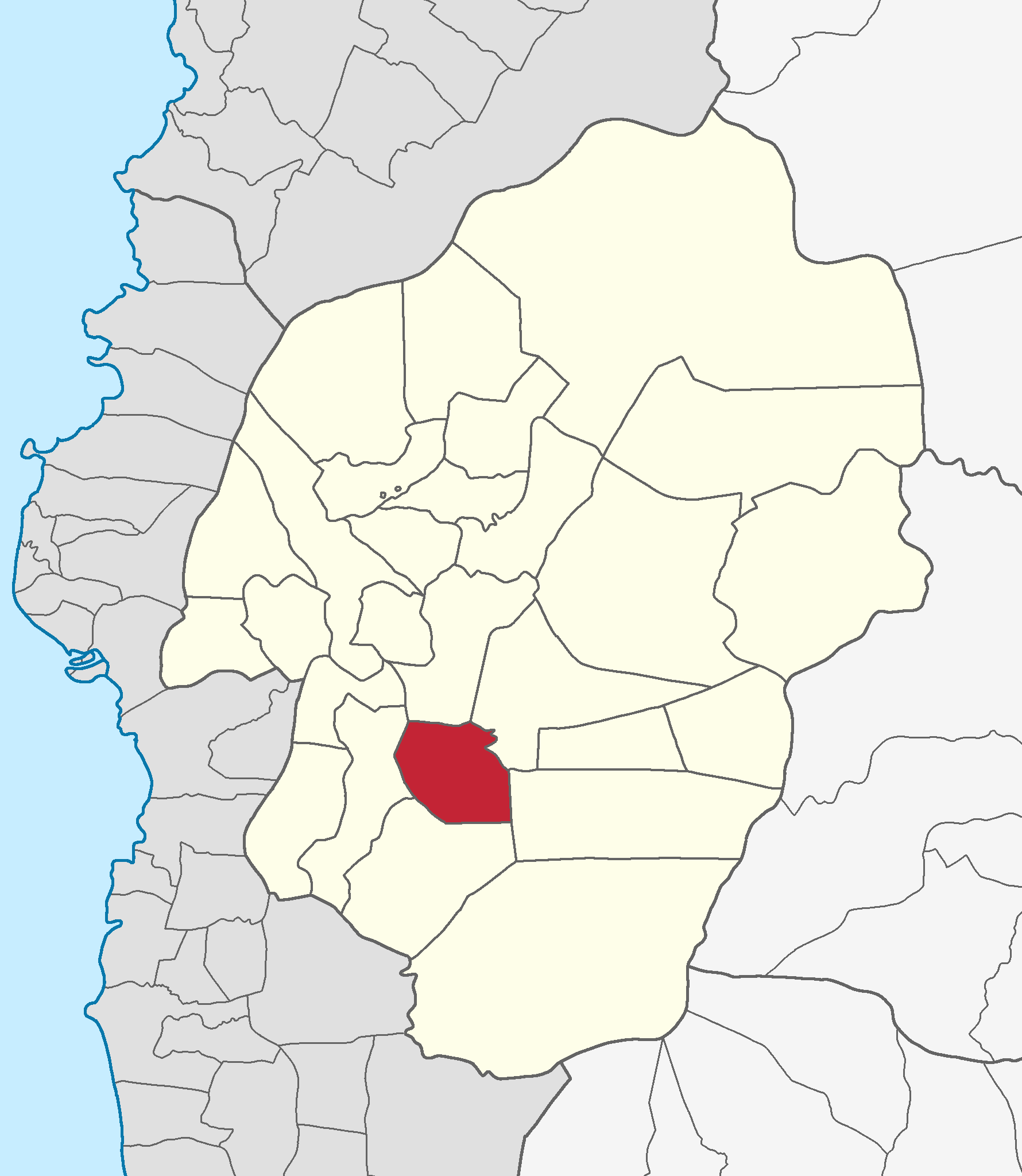
- Map of Abra with Manabo highlighted
- Interactive map of Manabo
- Location within the Philippines
- Coordinates: 17°26′N 120°42′E
- Country: Philippines
- Region: Cordillera Administrative Region
- Province: Abra
- District: Lone district
- Barangays: 11 (see Barangays)

Government
  - Type: Sangguniang Bayan
  - Mayor: Darrel O. Domasing
  - Vice Mayor: Jerry B. Andres
  - Representative: Joseph Santo Niño B. Bernos
  - Municipal Council: Members: Umer E. Ammasi; Recto T. Batondo; Arnel M. Bernales; Solmar A. Castro; Anastacia P. Bejarin; Baylon G. Gumanab; Joel S. Benabese; Reynaldo F. Abero Jr.
  - Electorate: 8,077 voters (2025)

Area
  - Total: 110.95 km^{2} (42.84 sq mi)
- Elevation: 250 m (820 ft)

Population (2024 census)
  - Total: 11,087
  - Density: 99.928/km^{2} (258.81/sq mi)
  - Households: 2,788

Economy
  - Income class: 3rd municipal income class
  - Poverty incidence: 9.4% (2023)
  - Revenue: ₱ 136.7 million (2024)
  - Assets: ₱ 533.7 million (2024)
  - Expenditure: ₱ 123.2 million (2024)
  - Liabilities: ₱ 162.4 million (2024)

Service provider
  - Electricity: Abra Electric Cooperative (ABRECO)
- Time zone: UTC+8 (PST)
- ZIP code: 2810
- PSGC: 1400116000
- IDD : area code: +63 (0)74
- Native languages: Itneg; Ilocano; Tagalog

Manabo, officially the Municipality of Manabo (Ilocano: Ili ti Manabo; Tagalog: Bayan ng Manabo), is a municipality in the province of Abra, Philippines. According to the 2024 census, it has a population of 11,087 people.

== Etymology ==
The name “Manabo” came from the word “Anabo”, a thorny herb used for making twines of rope, growing luxuriantly in the fields between San Jose Sur and Poblacion. One time during the Spanish regime, a group of Spaniards passed by the place and asked the name of the thorny herb. The people answered “Anabo”. From that time on, the Spaniards called the place Manabo.

== Geography ==
Manabo is located at 17°26′N 120°42′E. According to the Philippine Statistics Authority, the municipality has a land area of 110.95 square kilometres (42.84 sq mi) constituting 2.66% of the 4,165.25-square-kilometre- (1,608.21 sq mi) total area of Abra.

Manabo is situated 33.04 kilometres (20.53 mi) from the provincial capital Bangued, and 405.78 kilometres (252.14 mi) from the country's capital city of Manila.

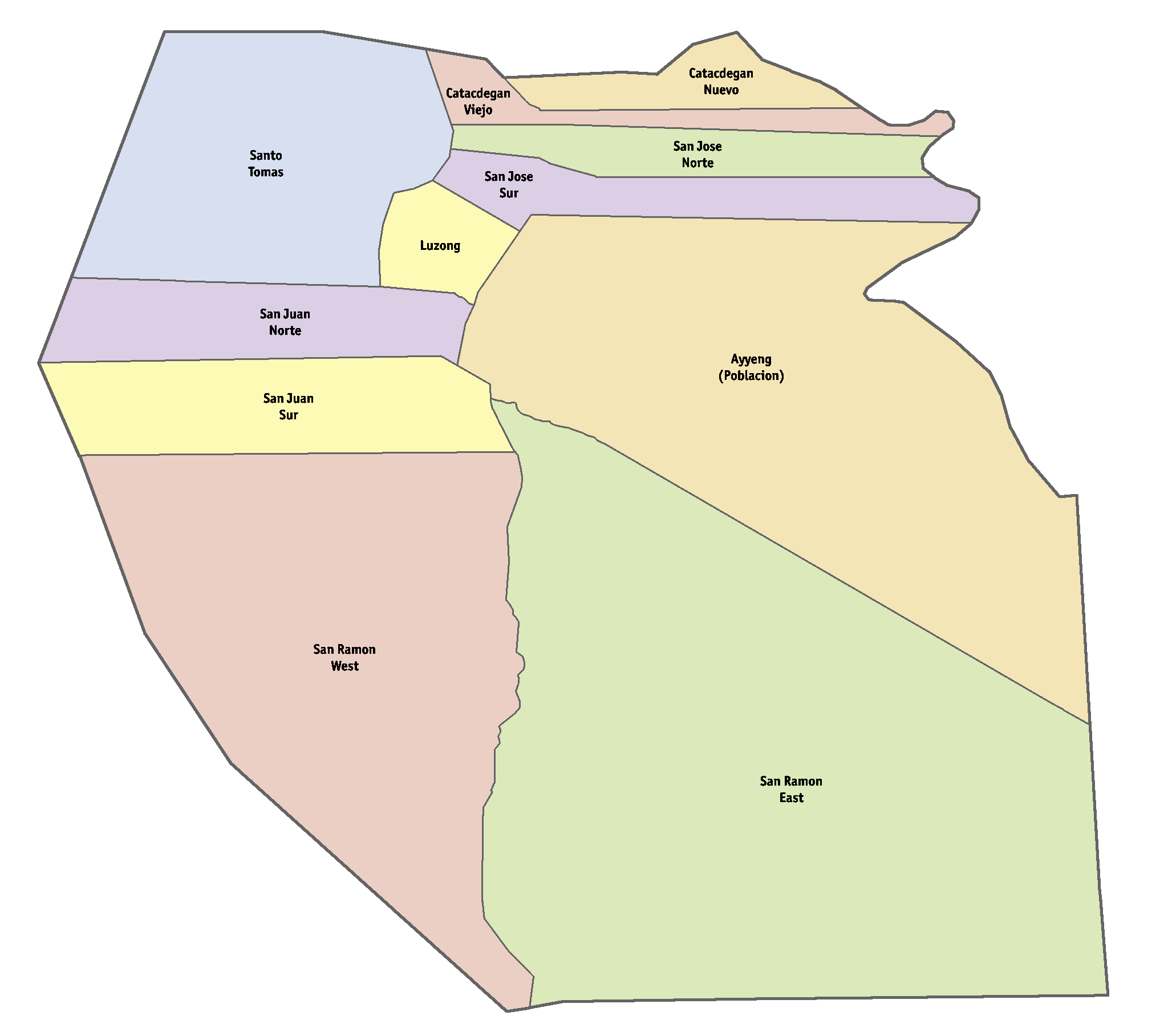
Political map of Manabo

=== Barangays ===
Manabo is politically subdivided into 11 barangays. Each barangay consists of puroks and some have sitios.

PSGC	Barangay	Population			±% p.a.	
		2024		2010		
140116004	Ayyeng (Poblacion)	15.8%	1,748	1,567	▴	0.76%
140116014	Catacdegan Nuevo	5.6%	617	600	▴	0.19%
140116002	Catacdegan Viejo	4.2%	465	473	▾	−0.12%
140116003	Luzong	10.1%	1,116	1,031	▴	0.55%
140116005	San Jose Norte	5.0%	556	604	▾	−0.57%
140116006	San Jose Sur	5.1%	563	535	▴	0.35%
140116007	San Juan Norte	5.7%	630	632	▾	−0.02%
140116008	San Juan Sur	6.5%	717	724	▾	−0.07%
140116011	San Ramon East	25.6%	2,843	2,185	▴	1.84%
140116012	San Ramon West	16.9%	1,878	1,960	▾	−0.30%
140116013	Santo Tomas	4.3%	478	445	▴	0.50%
	Total		11,087	11,611	▾	−0.32%

=== Climate ===
Climate data for Manabo, Abra
Month	Jan	Feb	Mar	Apr	May	Jun	Jul	Aug	Sep	Oct	Nov	Dec	Year
Mean daily maximum °C (°F)	27 (81)	28 (82)	30 (86)	32 (90)	31 (88)	31 (88)	31 (88)	30 (86)	30 (86)	30 (86)	29 (84)	27 (81)	30 (86)
Mean daily minimum °C (°F)	20 (68)	20 (68)	21 (70)	23 (73)	24 (75)	24 (75)	25 (77)	25 (77)	25 (77)	23 (73)	22 (72)	21 (70)	23 (73)
Average precipitation mm (inches)	23 (0.9)	28 (1.1)	33 (1.3)	64 (2.5)	232 (9.1)	242 (9.5)	258 (10.2)	266 (10.5)	245 (9.6)	201 (7.9)	87 (3.4)	69 (2.7)	1,748 (68.7)
Average rainy days	8.3	8.0	10.8	15.2	23.7	26.1	27.0	25.8	23.5	17.3	13.7	12.1	211.5
Source: Meteoblue

== Demographics ==
Population census of Manabo
Year	Pop.	±% p.a.
1918	2,318	—
1939	3,571	+2.08%
1948	3,658	+0.27%
1960	4,111	+0.98%
1970	6,009	+3.86%
1975	5,384	−2.18%
1980	6,590	+4.12%
1990	7,797	+1.70%
1995	8,633	+1.93%
2000	9,643	+2.40%
2007	10,538	+1.23%
2010	10,756	+0.75%
2015	10,761	+0.01%
2020	11,611	+1.61%
2024	11,087	−1.10%
Source: Philippine Statistics Authority

In the 2024 census, Manabo had a population of 11,087 people. The population density was 100 inhabitants per square kilometre (260/sq mi).

== Economy ==
Poverty incidence of Manabo (%)

Source: Philippine Statistics Authority

The economy of Manabo is primarily relied on agriculture. Manabo is recognized as a major rice granary of the province. Rice and corn serve as the primary agricultural staples. Manabo's major upland products are heirloom rice, wild honey, and locally processed fruit wines. The farming groups of Manabo receive backing for community-based micro-enterprises.

== Government ==
=== Local government ===
Manabo, belonging to the lone congressional district of the province of Abra, is governed by a mayor designated as its local chief executive and by a municipal council as its legislative body in accordance with the Local Government Code. The mayor, vice mayor, and the councilors are elected directly by the people through an election which is being held every three years.

=== Elected officials ===
Members of the Municipal Council (2025–2028)
Position	Name
Congressman	Joseph Santo Niño B. Bernos
Mayor	Darrel O. Domasing
Vice-Mayor	Jerry B. Andres
Councilors	Umer E. Ammasi
Councilors	Reynaldo F. Abero, Jr.
Councilors	Recto T. Batondo
Councilors	Anastacia P. Bejarin
Councilors	Baylon G. Gumanab
Councilors	Arnel M. Bernales
Councilors	Solmar A. Castro
Councilors	Joel S. Benabese

== Education ==
The Manabo Schools District Office governs all educational institutions within the municipality. It oversees the management and operations of all private and public, from primary to secondary schools.

=== Primary and elementary schools ===
- Banat Elementary School
- Casakgudan Primary School
- Catacdegan Elementary School
- Liagan Primary School
- Madago Elementary School
- Manabo Pilot Elementary School
- San Jose Elementary School
- San Ramon Elementary School
- Sapdaan Elementary School
- Sto. Tomas Barrio School

=== Secondary school ===
- Manabo National High School (San Jose Catacdegan National High School)
- Our Lady of Lourdes High School of Manabo, Abra Incorporated
