= Kalinga-Apayao's at-large congressional district =

At-large Philippine legislative district for Kalinga-Apayao

- Former constituency for the House of Representatives of the Philippines and Batasang Pambansa
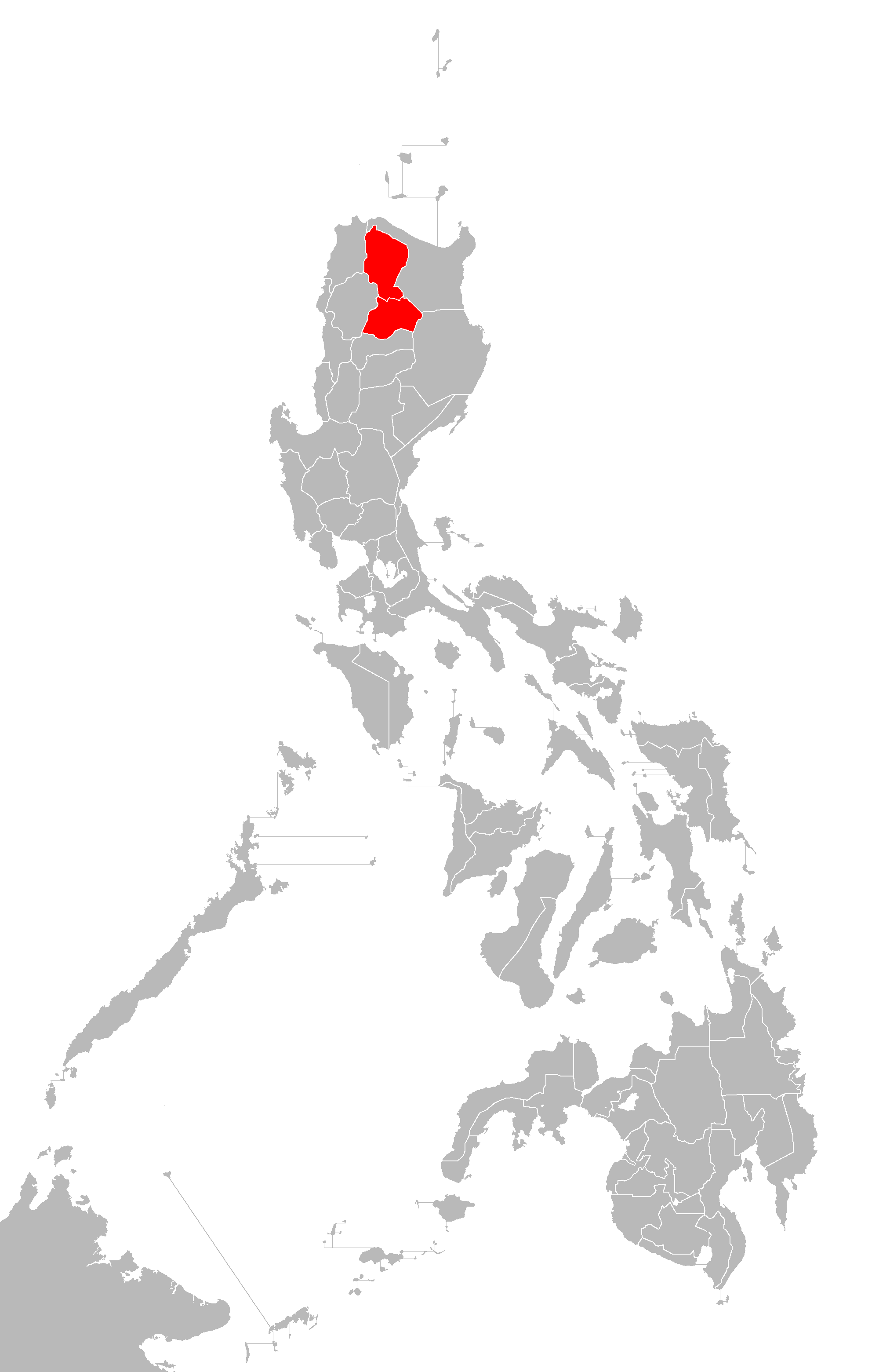
- Location of Kalinga-Apayao within the Philippines
- Province: Kalinga-Apayao
- Region: Cordillera Administrative Region (1987–1998)

Former constituency
- Created: 1966 (first creation); 1984 (second creation); 1987 (third creation)
- Abolished: 1973 (first abolition); 1986 (second abolition); 1995 (third abolition)

Kalinga-Apayao's at-large congressional district was the sole congressional district of the Philippines in the province of Kalinga-Apayao following its creation from the sub-provinces of Apayao and Kalinga, formerly part of Mountain Province's 1st district, on three occasions between 1969 and 1998. It was first created in 1966 following the passage of Republic Act No. 4695, when the greater Mountain Province was divided into the provinces of Benguet, Ifugao, Kalinga-Apayao, and a smaller Mountain Province. It was a single-member district throughout the last legislature of the House of Representatives before the imposition of martial law from 1969 to 1972, before it was dissolved into the 14-seat Region I at-large district for the Interim Batasang Pambansa in 1978.

The district served as an electoral district in the 1971 Constitutional Convention, with two delegates representing Kalinga-Apayao at-large. It was later re-created in 1987 following the re-establishment of the bicameral Congress and reverted to a single-member district for the first three legislatures of the House of Representatives from 1987 to 1998.

It was formally abolished in 1998 (Note: Incumbent representative Elias Bulut continued serving after the act was enacted into law in 1995, representing the district until 1998 in the 10th Congress, when Apayao and Kalinga began electing their own representatives. Bulut subsequently ran successfully for Apayao's lone district.) following the passage of Republic Act No. 7878 in 1995, which separated the province into the provinces of Apayao and Kalinga, each being redistricted to separate at-large districts. The district was last represented by Elias Bulut of Lakas–CMD, who also became the first representative of Apayao's at-large congressional district under Laban ng Demokratikong Pilipino following its dissolution.

== List of members representing the district ==
=== House of Representatives (1945–1973) ===
Portrait	Member	Term of office		Legislature	Party	Electoral history	Constituent LGUs
Portrait	Member	Start	End	Legislature	Party	Electoral history	Constituent LGUs
District created June 18, 1966, from Mountain Province's 2nd district.
	Felipe Almazan	December 30, 1969	January 17, 1973	7th Congress	Nacionalista	Elected in 1969. Term cut short upon the ratification of a new Constitution.	1969–1971; Balbalan, Calanasan, Conner, Flora, Kabugao, Liwan, Lubuagan, Luna, Pasil, Pinukpuk, Pudtol, Quirino, Santa Marcela, Tabuk, Tanudan, Tinglayan
	Felipe Almazan	December 30, 1969	January 17, 1973	7th Congress	Nacionalista	Elected in 1969. Term cut short upon the ratification of a new Constitution.	1971–1973; Balbalan, Calanasan, Conner, Flora, Kabugao, Lubuagan, Luna, Pasil, Pinukpuk, Pudtol, Rizal, Quirino, Santa Marcela, Tabuk, Tanudan, Tinglayan
District dissolved into the twelve-seat Region I's at-large district for the Interim Batasang Pambansa.

=== 1971 Constitutional Convention (1971–1972) ===
Seat A						Seat B						Legislature	Constituent LGUs
Portrait	Member	Term of office		Party	Electoral history	Portrait	Member	Term of office		Party	Electoral history	Legislature	Constituent LGUs
Portrait	Member	Start	End	Party	Electoral history	Portrait	Member	Start	End	Party	Electoral history	Legislature	Constituent LGUs
	Infante Calaycay	June 1, 1971	November 29, 1972	Nonpartisan	Elected in 1970.		Eubulo Verzola	June 1, 1971	November 29, 1972	Nonpartisan	Elected in 1970.	1971 Constitutional Convention	1971–1972; Balbalan, Calanasan, Conner, Flora, Kabugao, Lubuagan, Luna, Pasil, Pinukpuk, Pudtol, Rizal, Quirino, Santa Marcela, Tabuk, Tanudan, Tinglayan

=== Batasang Pambansa (1978–1986) ===
Portrait	Member	Term of office		Legislature	Party	Electoral history	Constituent LGUs
Portrait	Member	Start	End	Legislature	Party	Electoral history	Constituent LGUs
District re-created February 1, 1984.
	David Puzon	June 30, 1984	March 25, 1986	Regular Batasang Pambansa	KBL	Elected in 1984.	1984–1986; Balbalan, Calanasan, Conner, Flora, Kabugao, Lubuagan, Luna, Pasil, Pinukpuk, Pudtol, Rizal, Santa Marcela, Tabuk, Tanudan, Tinglayan

=== House of Representatives (1987–present) ===
Portrait	Member	Term of office		Legislature	Party	Electoral history	Constituent LGUs
Portrait	Member	Start	End	Legislature	Party	Electoral history	Constituent LGUs
District re-created February 2, 1987.
	William Claver	June 30, 1987	June 30, 1992	8th Congress	PDP–Laban	Elected in 1987.	1987–1998; Balbalan, Calanasan, Conner, Flora, Kabugao, Lubuagan, Luna, Pasil, Pinukpuk, Pudtol, Rizal, Santa Marcela, Tabuk, Tanudan, Tinglayan
	William Claver	June 30, 1987	June 30, 1992	8th Congress	Lakas	Elected in 1987.	1987–1998; Balbalan, Calanasan, Conner, Flora, Kabugao, Lubuagan, Luna, Pasil, Pinukpuk, Pudtol, Rizal, Santa Marcela, Tabuk, Tanudan, Tinglayan
	Elias Bulut Sr.	June 30, 1992	June 30, 1998	9th Congress	LDP	Elected in 1992.	1987–1998; Balbalan, Calanasan, Conner, Flora, Kabugao, Lubuagan, Luna, Pasil, Pinukpuk, Pudtol, Rizal, Santa Marcela, Tabuk, Tanudan, Tinglayan
	Elias Bulut Sr.	June 30, 1992	June 30, 1998	10th Congress	Lakas	Re-elected in 1995. Redistricted to Apayao's at-large district.	1987–1998; Balbalan, Calanasan, Conner, Flora, Kabugao, Lubuagan, Luna, Pasil, Pinukpuk, Pudtol, Rizal, Santa Marcela, Tabuk, Tanudan, Tinglayan

== Election results ==
=== 1984 ===
1984 Philippine parliamentary election in Kalinga-Apayao
Party	Candidate	Votes	%
KBL	Victor Dominguez	24,198	
UNIDO	Domingo Masadao Jr.	8,048	
Independent	Amado Vargas	7,454	
KBL	Tanding Odiem	2,939	
Nacionalista	Alfredo Apaling		
UNIDO	Inocencio Lopez		
Independent	Ephraim Ordonio		

=== 1992 ===
1992 Philippine House of Representatives elections in Kalinga-Apayao
Party	Candidate	Votes	%
LDP	Elias Bulut	29,584	42.03
Lakas	William Claver (incumbent)	18,716	26.59
Lakas	Amelia Miranda	10,843	15.40
KBL	Augustus Saboy	9,914	14.08
KBL	Zoilo Collado	1,257	1.79
PSP	Alfredo Macarandang Jr.	79	0.11
Total votes		70,393	100.00
LDP gain from Lakas			

=== 1995 ===
1995 Philippine House of Representatives elections in Kalinga-Apayao
Party	Candidate	Votes	%
Lakas	Elias Bulut (incumbent)	62,386	76.06
NPC	Amelia Miranda	11,013	13.43
LDP	Juanito Eyadan	8,618	10.51
Total votes		82,017	100.00
Lakas hold			

== See also ==
- Legislative districts of Kalinga-Apayao
