= List of barangays in Apayao =

The province of Apayao has 133 barangays comprising its 7 municipalities.

== Barangays ==
Most populous in its respective municipality (as of 2010)

| Barangay | Population | | | | | Municipality |
| Barangay | 2010 | 2007 | 2000 | 1995 | 1990 | Municipality |
|---|---|---|---|---|---|---|
| Aga | 276 | 186 | 119 | 159 | 101 | Pudtol |
| Alem | 875 | 801 | 720 | 543 | 473 | Pudtol |
| Allangigan | 424 | 449 | 432 | 352 | 329 | Conner |
| Allig | 1,507 | 1,384 | 1,545 | 1,529 | 1,413 | Flora |
| Amado | 791 | 772 | 605 | 426 | 371 | Pudtol |
| Anninipan | 930 | 924 | 893 | 713 | 678 | Flora |
| Atok | 584 | 755 | 781 | 594 | 32 | Flora |
| Aurora | 296 | 260 | 225 | 174 | 373 | Pudtol |
| Bacsay | 850 | 819 | 748 | 803 | 629 | Luna |
| Badduat | 1,000 | 1,039 | 911 | 733 | 705 | Kabugao |
| Bagutong | 1,384 | 1,198 | 1,063 | 837 | 729 | Flora |
| Balasi | 238 | 213 | 163 | 102 | – | Flora |
| Baliwanan | 478 | 502 | 493 | 466 | 489 | Kabugao |
| Balluyan | 1,501 | 1,449 | 1,294 | 1,187 | 1,196 | Flora |
| Banban | 1,042 | 879 | 851 | 637 | 708 | Conner |
| Barocboc | 1,548 | 1,526 | 1,177 | 1,101 | 959 | Santa Marcela |
| Bulu | 298 | 281 | 389 | 435 | 358 | Kabugao |
| Buluan | 1,462 | 1,372 | 1,212 | 988 | 835 | Conner |
| Butao | 672 | 595 | 1,106 | 1,067 | 791 | Calanasan |
| Cabatacan | 1,313 | 1,528 | 1,345 | 1,280 | 1,106 | Pudtol |
| Cabetayan | 556 | 606 | 547 | 398 | 360 | Kabugao |
| Cacalaggan | 405 | 384 | 196 | 143 | 132 | Pudtol |
| Cadaclan | 437 | 414 | 944 | 592 | 516 | Calanasan |
| Cagandungan | 618 | 588 | 310 | 23 | 13 | Luna |
| Caglayan (New Poblacion) | 1,865 | 1,817 | 1,558 | 1,336 | 1,169 | Conner |
| Calabigan | 532 | 186 | 177 | 180 | 72 | Luna |
| Calafug | 906 | 862 | 665 | 609 | 479 | Conner |
| Cangisitan | 683 | 645 | 646 | 551 | 570 | Luna |
| Capagaypayan | 468 | 504 | 446 | 325 | 283 | Luna |
| Capannikian | 1,192 | 1,158 | 1,082 | 963 | 839 | Pudtol |
| Consuelo | 871 | 827 | 747 | 709 | 618 | Santa Marcela |
| Cupis | 441 | 411 | 370 | 321 | 321 | Conner |
| Daga | 1,281 | 1,039 | 956 | 676 | 834 | Conner |
| Dagara | 484 | 426 | 453 | 477 | 347 | Kabugao |
| Dagupan | 2,038 | 1,776 | 1,752 | 1,597 | 1,415 | Luna |
| Dibagat | 797 | 474 | 840 | 792 | 728 | Kabugao |
| Don Roque Ablan Sr. | 273 | 232 | 440 | 414 | 361 | Calanasan |
| Doña Loreta | 711 | 692 | 686 | 454 | 396 | Pudtol |
| Eleazar | 121 | 90 | 204 | 197 | 172 | Calanasan |
| Emilia | 427 | 462 | 557 | 472 | 411 | Pudtol |
| Emiliana | 787 | 708 | 605 | 588 | 448 | Santa Marcela |
| Eva Puzon | 1,072 | 940 | 819 | 388 | 338 | Calanasan |
| Guinaang | 1,476 | 1,261 | 1,290 | 1,191 | 961 | Conner |
| Guinamgaman | 841 | 662 | 618 | 524 | 375 | Conner |
| Ili | 1,195 | 1,074 | 922 | 907 | 870 | Conner |
| Imelda | 552 | 577 | 540 | 495 | 370 | Pudtol |
| Imelda (Sipa Annex) | 850 | 811 | 714 | 692 | 603 | Santa Marcela |
| Kabugawan | 484 | 352 | 575 | 554 | 716 | Calanasan |
| Karagawan | 676 | 692 | 657 | 732 | 571 | Kabugao |
| Karikitan | 1,928 | 1,771 | 1,625 | 1,482 | 1,490 | Conner |
| Katablangan | 697 | 602 | 681 | 657 | 555 | Conner |
| Kumao | 557 | 602 | 618 | 584 | 520 | Kabugao |
| Laco | 410 | 364 | 374 | 394 | 407 | Kabugao |
| Langnao | 164 | 140 | 496 | 467 | 407 | Calanasan |
| Lappa | 667 | 620 | 431 | 216 | 187 | Luna |
| Lenneng (Liyyeng) | 2,396 | 2,049 | 1,602 | 1,227 | 1,069 | Kabugao |
| Lower Maton | 345 | 285 | 213 | 157 | 137 | Pudtol |
| Lt. Bilag | 176 | 121 | 79 | 93 | 81 | Pudtol |
| Lubong | 612 | 497 | 761 | 800 | 567 | Calanasan |
| Lucab | 660 | 583 | 631 | 412 | 359 | Kabugao |
| Luttuacan | 786 | 826 | 681 | 658 | 520 | Kabugao |
| Luyon | 350 | 301 | 170 | 113 | 162 | Luna |
| Lydia | 529 | 447 | 442 | 275 | 202 | Pudtol |
| Macalino | 265 | 200 | – | – | – | Calanasan |
| Madatag | 766 | 755 | 663 | 583 | 581 | Kabugao |
| Madduang | 423 | 409 | 334 | 358 | 247 | Kabugao |
| Magabta | 215 | 218 | 249 | 236 | 151 | Kabugao |
| Malama | 2,885 | 2,645 | 2,398 | 1,958 | 1,778 | Conner |
| Malayugan | 1,290 | 1,162 | 1,195 | 964 | 882 | Flora |
| Malekkeg | 970 | 987 | 925 | 795 | 693 | Santa Marcela |
| Malibang | 472 | 392 | 317 | 231 | 201 | Pudtol |
| Mallig | 538 | 497 | 430 | 201 | – | Flora |
| Malubibit Norte | 1,005 | 950 | 858 | 851 | 804 | Flora |
| Malubibit Sur | 459 | 502 | 454 | 347 | 239 | Flora |
| Manag | 1,629 | 1,619 | 1,567 | 1,230 | 1,229 | Conner |
| Marag | 557 | 502 | 471 | 240 | 146 | Luna |
| Maragat | 503 | 367 | 466 | 491 | 339 | Kabugao |
| Marcela (Poblacion) | 1,120 | 1,024 | 983 | 895 | 780 | Santa Marcela |
| Mataguisi | 807 | 484 | 368 | 335 | 292 | Pudtol |
| Mawegui | 763 | 792 | 773 | 762 | 628 | Conner |
| Musimut | 822 | 776 | 874 | 822 | 894 | Kabugao |
| Nabuangan | 594 | 652 | 591 | 533 | 470 | Conner |
| Nagbabalayan | 511 | 457 | 521 | 490 | 418 | Kabugao |
| Naguilian | 389 | 288 | 463 | 542 | 504 | Calanasan |
| Namaltugan | 924 | 917 | 1,134 | 1,117 | 1,146 | Calanasan |
| Nueva | 662 | 667 | 631 | 349 | 513 | Santa Marcela |
| Paddaoan | 1,623 | 1,568 | 1,338 | 1,273 | 1,131 | Conner |
| Panay | 766 | 777 | 522 | 710 | 303 | Santa Marcela |
| Poblacion | 1,939 | 1,492 | 1,380 | 1,281 | 1,029 | Calanasan |
| Poblacion | 3,217 | 2,602 | 2,164 | 1,857 | 1,721 | Kabugao |
| Poblacion | 1,107 | 1,057 | 1,030 | 1,012 | 968 | Luna |
| Poblacion | 836 | 886 | 914 | 764 | 666 | Pudtol |
| Poblacion East | 2,598 | 2,420 | 2,130 | 2,260 | 1,993 | Flora |
| Poblacion West | 2,120 | 1,831 | 1,771 | 1,412 | 1,736 | Flora |
| Puguin | 805 | 394 | 268 | 274 | 404 | Conner |
| Quirino | 1,228 | 1,137 | 1,011 | 1,013 | 900 | Luna |
| Ripang (Old Poblacion) | 841 | 828 | 665 | 573 | 554 | Conner |
| Sabangan | 379 | 298 | 648 | 643 | 510 | Calanasan |
| Sacpil | 1,141 | 1,104 | 854 | 607 | 565 | Conner |
| Salvacion | 395 | 329 | 312 | 23 | 20 | Luna |
| San Antonio | 799 | 738 | 650 | 958 | 619 | Santa Marcela |
| San Antonio (Pugo) | 171 | 152 | 191 | 111 | 97 | Pudtol |
| San Carlos | 1,138 | 1,130 | 881 | 541 | 471 | Santa Marcela |
| San Francisco | 840 | 741 | 669 | 631 | 501 | Luna |
| San Gregorio | 529 | 478 | 358 | 296 | 222 | Luna |
| San Isidro Norte | 750 | 705 | 599 | 443 | 386 | Luna |
| San Isidro Sur | 1,326 | 1,245 | 889 | 815 | 811 | Luna |
| San Jose | 690 | 749 | 440 | 391 | 331 | Flora |
| San Jose | 361 | 301 | 298 | 174 | 152 | Pudtol |
| San Juan | 461 | 620 | 308 | 151 | 132 | Santa Marcela |
| San Luis | 683 | 749 | 542 | 493 | 382 | Pudtol |
| San Mariano | 463 | 385 | 191 | 53 | 109 | Pudtol |
| San Mariano | 978 | 897 | 741 | 715 | 648 | Santa Marcela |
| San Sebastian | 355 | 336 | 320 | 335 | 318 | Luna |
| Santa Elena | 221 | 142 | – | – | – | Calanasan |
| Santa Filomena | 859 | 809 | 936 | 715 | 814 | Calanasan |
| Santa Lina | 1,026 | 978 | 904 | 836 | 696 | Luna |
| Santa Maria | 817 | 983 | 810 | 595 | 679 | Flora |
| Shalom | 666 | 655 | 598 | 497 | 433 | Luna |
| Sipa Proper | 1,060 | 1,019 | 972 | 514 | 835 | Santa Marcela |
| Swan | 1,253 | 1,182 | 1,194 | 601 | 524 | Pudtol |
| Talifugo | 972 | 867 | 795 | 571 | 535 | Conner |
| Tamalunog | 837 | 843 | 851 | 174 | 98 | Flora |
| Tanglagan | 1,951 | 1,729 | 1,653 | 1,742 | 1,912 | Calanasan |
| Tubang | 411 | 314 | 621 | 552 | 481 | Calanasan |
| Tubongan | 395 | 214 | 626 | 608 | 435 | Calanasan |
| Tumog | 1,285 | 1,285 | 1,182 | 1,092 | 922 | Luna |
| Turod | 1,064 | 925 | 656 | 645 | 513 | Luna |
| Tuyangan | 334 | 298 | 310 | 296 | 227 | Kabugao |
| Upper Atok (Coliman) | 245 | 156 | 182 | 153 | – | Flora |
| Upper Maton | 371 | 391 | 215 | 260 | 206 | Pudtol |
| Waga | 281 | 203 | 208 | 269 | 187 | Kabugao |
| Zumigui | 695 | 619 | 475 | 440 | 383 | Luna |
| Barangay | 2010 | 2007 | 2000 | 1995 | 1990 | Municipality |
*Italicized names are former names.; *Dashes (–) in cells indicate unavailable census data.

[top]
