= Isnag language =

Austronesian language spoken in the Philippines

Isnag
- Isneg (Ilocano term)
- Native to: Philippines
- Region: most parts of Apayao province, parts of Cagayan, Ilocos Norte, and northern parts of Abra, Luzon
- Native speakers: 50,101 (2020 census)
- Language family: Austronesian: Malayo-Polynesian; Philippine; Northern Luzon; Cagayan Valley; Isnag

Official status
- Recognised minority language in: Regional language in the Philippines

Language codes
- ISO 639-3: Either: isd – Isnag tiu – Adasen
- Glottolog: isna1241 Isnag
- Linguasphere: 31-CCA-a incl. inner units 31-CCA-aa...-ae
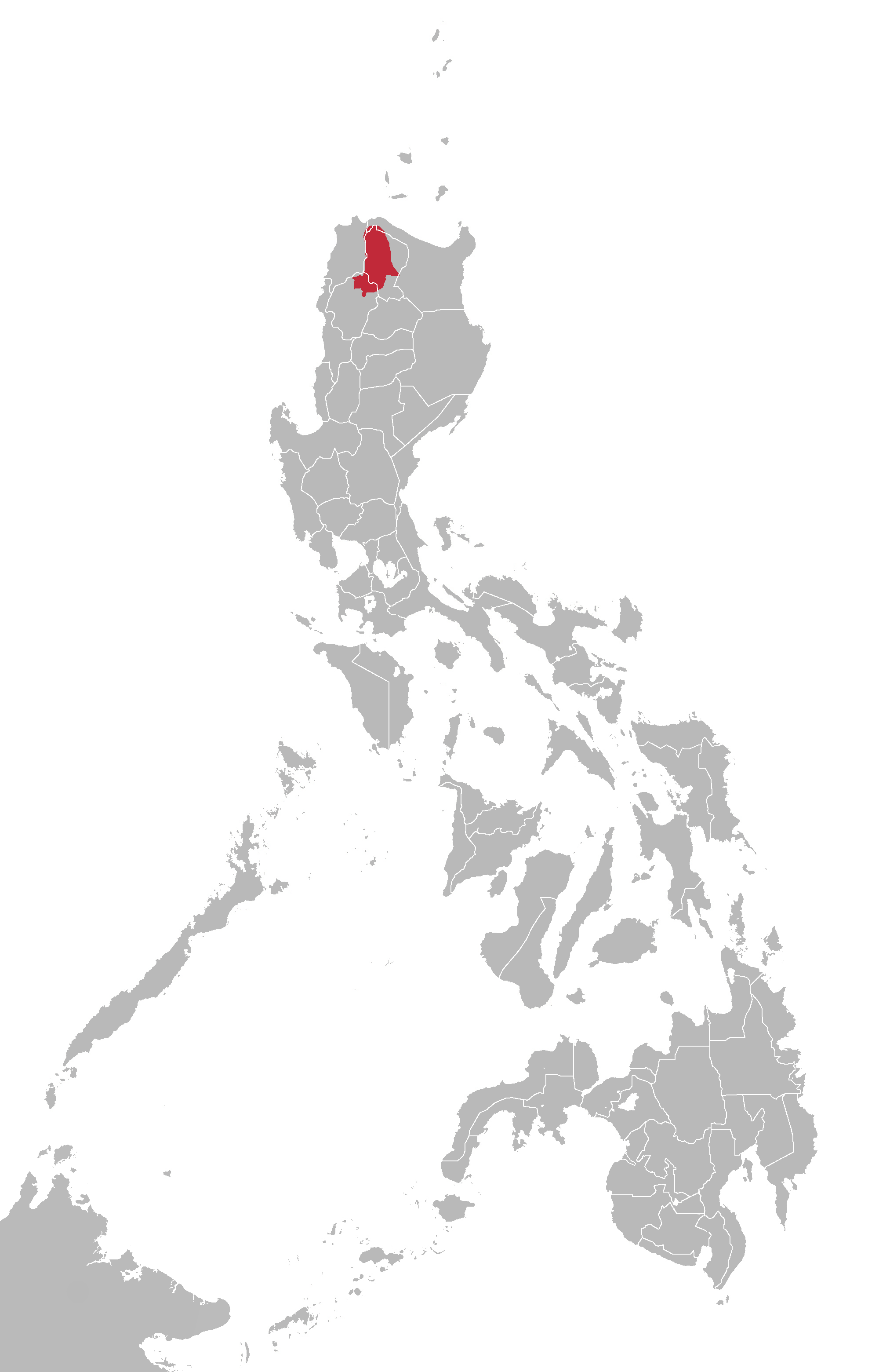
- The area where the Isnag dialect originated and is spoken, according to Ethnologue

Isnag (also called Isneg a term used by the Ilocanos) is an Austronesian language spoken by around 50,101 Isnag people of Apayao Province in the Cordillera Administrative Region in the northern Philippines, who are also found in parts of Cagayan and Ilocos Norte. Their populations are distributed across the municipalities of Calanasan, Kabugao, Pudtol, Flora, Luna, Santa Marcela, and Conner in Apayao; the eastern part of Ilocos Norte, specifically Adams, Carasi, Dumalneg, Vintar, Marcos, Dingras, Solsona, Bangui, and Pagudpud; the northwestern part of Cagayan, particularly Santa Praxedes, Claveria, Sanchez Mira, and Pamplona; and the northern part of Abra, particularly Tineg. Around 85% of Isnag are capable of reading the Isnag language. Many Isnag speakers also speak Ilocano.

== Dialects ==
Ethnologue lists the following dialects of Isnag.

- Imandaya: Predominantly found in Calanasan, Apayao; Carasi, Ilocos Norte; Solsona, Ilocos Norte; Barangay Cacafean, Marcos, Ilocos Norte; Barangay San Marcelino, Dingras, Ilocos Norte; Barangay Marag in Luna, Apayao; Barangay Kittag in Sanchez Mira, Cagayan; and Barangay Masi in Pamplona, Cagayan.
- Imallod: Populations are spread across Kabugao, Pudtol, Flora, Santa Marcela, and Luna in Apayao.
- Itawit: A sub-tribe of the Isnag people, populations are distributed in the municipality of Pudtol, Apayao and some parts of Flora, Apayao.
- Ingahan: A sub-tribe of the Isnag people, primarily inhabiting areas along the Nagan River in Pudtol, Apayao.
- Isnag (Isneg) of Katablangan, Conner: Often spelled as Isneg due to the tribe's pronunciation, found primarily in Conner, Apayao part.
- Iyapayao (Ehapayao/Yapayao): Populations are distributed in Adams, Dumalneg, Bangui, and Pagudpud in Ilocos Norte, as well as Sta. Praxedes in Cagayan.
- Imalawa: An Isnag subtribe located in the outskirts of Barangay Canaam and Sitio Dasar, Barangay Isic-isic, Vintar, Ilocos Norte. The Malawa live in the village of Isic Isic, a peaceful and charming area in the Surong Valley, known for its natural beauty and friendly inhabitants.

== Sounds ==
Vowel phonemes
	Front	Back
High	i	
Mid	e	o
Close	a	

Consonants
		Labial	Alveolar	Palatal	Velar	Glottal
Nasal		m	n	ɲ	ŋ	
Plosive/ Affricate	voiceless	p	t	tʃ	k	ʔ
Plosive/ Affricate	voiced	b	d	dʒ	ɡ	ʔ
Fricative		f v	s	ʃ		h
Approximant			l	j	w	
Tap			ɾ			

Isnag is one of the Philippine languages that do not exhibit [ɾ]-[d] allophony.

== Language sample ==
- Isnag: Mahi indo' tada ngamin ta ngamin tada ay magwawwáhi, ta ya pahin indo' kiya isa tulay ay maggayát ke Dios. – 1 Juan 4:7
  - Approximate English translation: Friends, let us love each other, because love comes from God. – 1 John 4:7
- Isnag: Day-dayáwan tada nge Dios, nga Dios se Ama naya Apu tada nga Jesu-Cristo. – 1 Pedro 1:3
  - Approximate English Translation: Praise God, the God and Father of the Lord Jesus Christ. – 1 Peter 1:3

== Historical sound changes ==
The Proto-Malayo-Polynesian schwa ə has merged to /a/ such as *qatəp > atap ('roof') similar to Kapampangan, atip in Tagalog and atup in Visayan.
