= Santa Marcela, Apayao =

Municipality in Apayao, Philippines

Santa Marcela
- Municipality
- Municipality of Santa Marcela
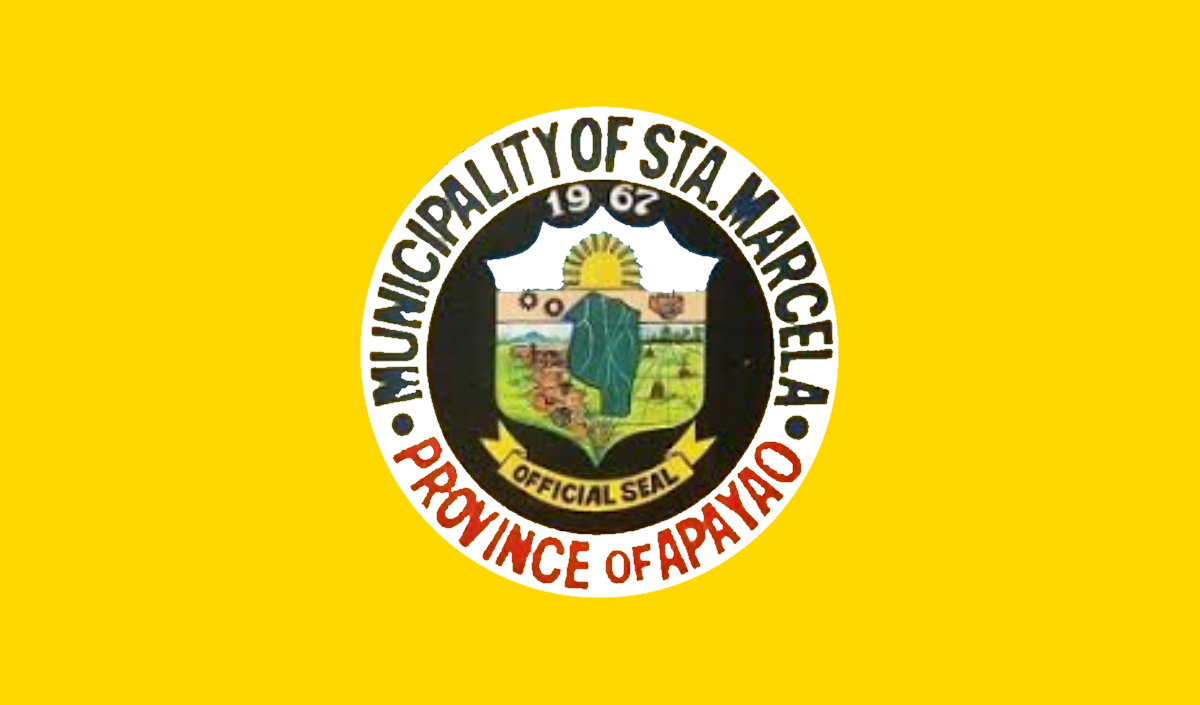
- Flag

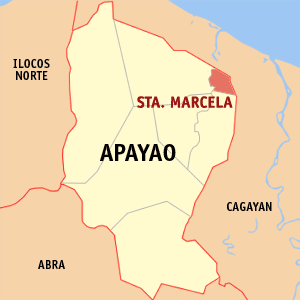
- Map of Apayao with Santa Marcela highlighted
- Interactive map of Santa Marcela
- Location within the Philippines
- Coordinates: 18°17′14″N 121°26′15″E
- Country: Philippines
- Region: Cordillera Administrative Region
- Province: Apayao
- District: Lone district
- Named for: Saint Marcella
- Barangays: 13 (see Barangays)

Government
  - Type: Sangguniang Bayan
  - Mayor: Evelyn Barsatan-Martinez (Lakas)
  - Vice Mayor: Rolly U. Guiang (Lakas)
  - Representative: Eleanor Bulut-Begtang
  - Municipal Council: Members: Rizza T. Guiang; Rodan F. Pascua; Jayson M. Calban; Emely V. Aman; Estrella U. Guillermo; Mcleen B. Julian; Domingo P. Siloran Jr.; Revelina B. Umblas
  - Electorate: 8,671 voters (2025)

Area
  - Total: 196.32 km^{2} (75.80 sq mi)
- Elevation: 13 m (43 ft)
- Highest elevation: 54 m (177 ft)
- Lowest elevation: 3 m (9.8 ft)

Population (2024 census)
  - Total: 14,049
  - Density: 71.562/km^{2} (185.34/sq mi)
  - Households: 3,392

Economy
  - Income class: 4th municipal income class
  - Poverty incidence: 6.44% (2023)
  - Revenue: ₱ 137.4 million (2024)
  - Assets: ₱ 433.3 million (2024)
  - Expenditure: ₱ 110.5 million (2024)
  - Liabilities: ₱ 42.68 million (2024)

Service provider
  - Electricity: Kalinga - Apayao Electric Cooperative (KAELCO)
- Time zone: UTC+8 (PST)
- ZIP code: 3811
- PSGC: 1408107000
- IDD : area code: +63 (0)74
- Native languages: Isnag; Ilocano; Tagalog
- Website: www.stamarcela.gov.ph

Santa Marcela, officially the Municipality of Santa Marcela (Ilocano: Ili ti Santa Marcela; Tagalog: Bayan ng Santa Marcela), is a municipality in the province of Apayao, Philippines. According to the 2024 census, it has a population of 14,049 people.

== History ==
Santa Marcela was created into an independent municipality on June 17, 1967, when several barrios were separated from Luna and Flora and constituted into the newly created town.

== Geography ==
According to the Philippine Statistics Authority, the municipality has a land area of 196.32 square kilometres (75.80 sq mi) constituting 4.45% of the 4,413.35-square-kilometre- (1,704.00 sq mi) total area of Apayao.

Santa Marcela is situated 88.72 kilometres (55.13 mi) from the provincial capital Kabugao, and 611.61 kilometres (380.04 mi) from the country's capital city of Manila.

=== Barangays ===
Santa Marcela is politically subdivided into 13 barangays. Each barangay consists of puroks and some have sitios.

PSGC	Barangay	Population			±% p.a.	
		2024		2010		
148107001	Barocboc	10.5%	1,472	1,548	▾	−0.35%
148107002	Consuelo	6.4%	900	871	▴	0.23%
148107012	Emiliana	6.0%	838	787	▴	0.44%
148107003	Imelda (Sipa Annex)	6.6%	927	850	▴	0.60%
148107004	Malekkeg	8.3%	1,169	970	▴	1.30%
148107005	Marcela (Poblacion)	9.7%	1,368	1,120	▴	1.40%
148107006	Nueva	5.6%	788	662	▴	1.22%
148107007	Panay	6.9%	969	766	▴	1.65%
148107008	San Antonio	5.8%	811	799	▴	0.10%
148107013	San Carlos	10.7%	1,498	1,138	▴	1.93%
148107014	San Juan	4.2%	596	461	▴	1.80%
148107015	San Mariano	7.0%	987	978	▴	0.06%
148107011	Sipa Proper	7.5%	1,060	1,060	Steady	0.00%
	Total		14,049	13,317	▴	0.37%

=== Climate ===
Climate data for Santa Marcela, Apayao
Month	Jan	Feb	Mar	Apr	May	Jun	Jul	Aug	Sep	Oct	Nov	Dec	Year
Mean daily maximum °C (°F)	25 (77)	26 (79)	29 (84)	31 (88)	31 (88)	31 (88)	30 (86)	30 (86)	30 (86)	28 (82)	27 (81)	25 (77)	29 (84)
Mean daily minimum °C (°F)	20 (68)	20 (68)	21 (70)	23 (73)	24 (75)	25 (77)	24 (75)	25 (77)	24 (75)	23 (73)	23 (73)	21 (70)	23 (73)
Average precipitation mm (inches)	120 (4.7)	77 (3.0)	62 (2.4)	40 (1.6)	118 (4.6)	138 (5.4)	162 (6.4)	173 (6.8)	143 (5.6)	198 (7.8)	185 (7.3)	248 (9.8)	1,664 (65.4)
Average rainy days	16.9	12.2	11.5	10.6	18.7	20.1	21.2	23.3	20.8	16.9	16.5	20.0	208.7
Source: Meteoblue

== Demographics ==
Population census of Santa Marcela
Year	Pop.	±% p.a.
1970	5,436	—
1975	7,185	+5.75%
1980	7,768	+1.57%
1990	7,622	−0.19%
1995	8,718	+2.55%
2000	9,856	+2.67%
2007	11,731	+2.43%
2010	12,010	+0.86%
2015	13,613	+2.41%
2020	13,317	−0.46%
2024	14,049	+1.29%
Source: Philippine Statistics Authority

In the 2024 census, Santa Marcela had a population of 14,049 people. The population density was 72 inhabitants per square kilometre (190/sq mi).

== Economy ==
Poverty incidence of Santa Marcela (%)

Source: Philippine Statistics Authority

The economy of Santa Marcela relies on agriculture, tourism, and small businesses. Rice and corn are the main agricultural crops of Santa Marcela.

Santa Marcela is known for its tourist spots such as Bacut Lake and Tacang Lake. Bacut Lake is a lake that has water through the floating bridge. Tacang Lake has a Tacang Small Water Impounding Project that consists of activities like ATV rides and kayaking. Small businesses are actively supported through government programs.

== Government ==
=== Local government ===
Santa Marcela, belonging to the lone congressional district of the province of Apayao, is governed by a mayor designated as its local chief executive and by a municipal council as its legislative body in accordance with the Local Government Code. The mayor, vice mayor, and the councilors are elected directly by the people through an election which is being held every three years.

=== Elected officials ===
Members of the Municipal Council (2025-2028)
Position	Name
Congressman	Eleanor C. Bulut-Begtang
Mayor	Evelyn B. Martinez
Vice-Mayor	Rolly U. Guiang
Councilors	Rizza T. Guiang
Councilors	Rodan F. Pascua
Councilors	Jayson M. Calban
Councilors	Emely V. Aman
Councilors	Mcleen B. Julian
Councilors	Estrella U. Guillermo
Councilors	Revelina B. Umblas
Councilors	Domingo P. Siloran Jr.

== Education ==
The Sta. Marcela Schools District Office governs all educational institutions within the municipality. It oversees the management and operations of all private and public, from primary to secondary schools.

=== Primary and elementary schools ===
- Barocboc Elementary School
- Consuelo Elementary School
- Emiliana Elementary School
- Imelda Elementary School
- Malekkeg Elementary School
- Panay Elementary School
- Nueva Primary School
- San Antonio Elementary School
- San Juan Elementary School
- Santa Marcela West Central Elementary School
- San Mariano Elementary School
- Sipa Elementary School
- Sta. Marcela Central School

=== Secondary schools ===
- Consuelo National High School
- Mayor Guillermo Barsatan Memorial School of Arts and Trade
- Sipa-Imelda National High School
- Sta. Marcela National High School
