= Pudtol =

Municipality in Apayao, Philippines

Pudtol Tawit
- Municipality
- Municipality of Pudtol
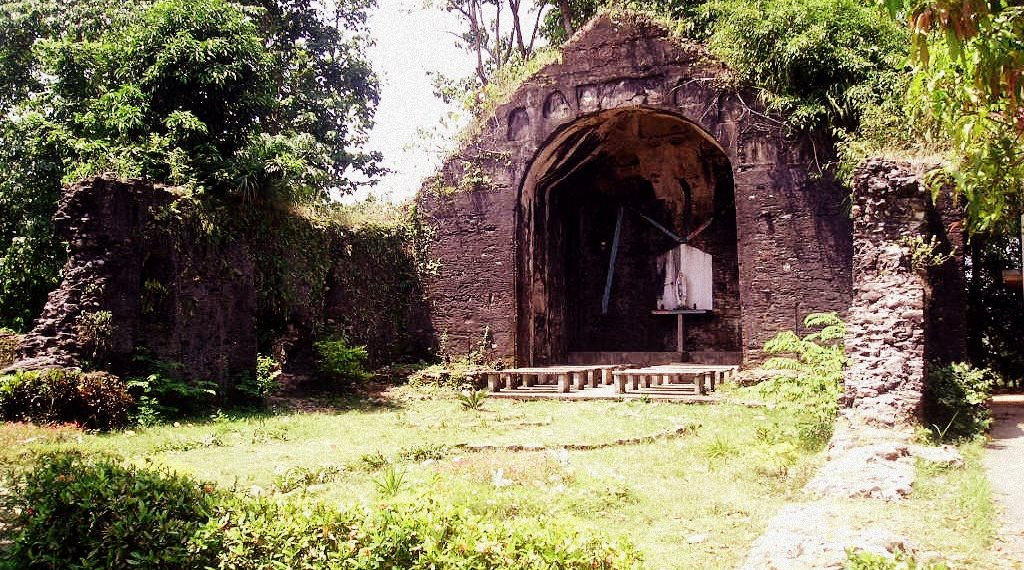
- Pudtol Church ruins

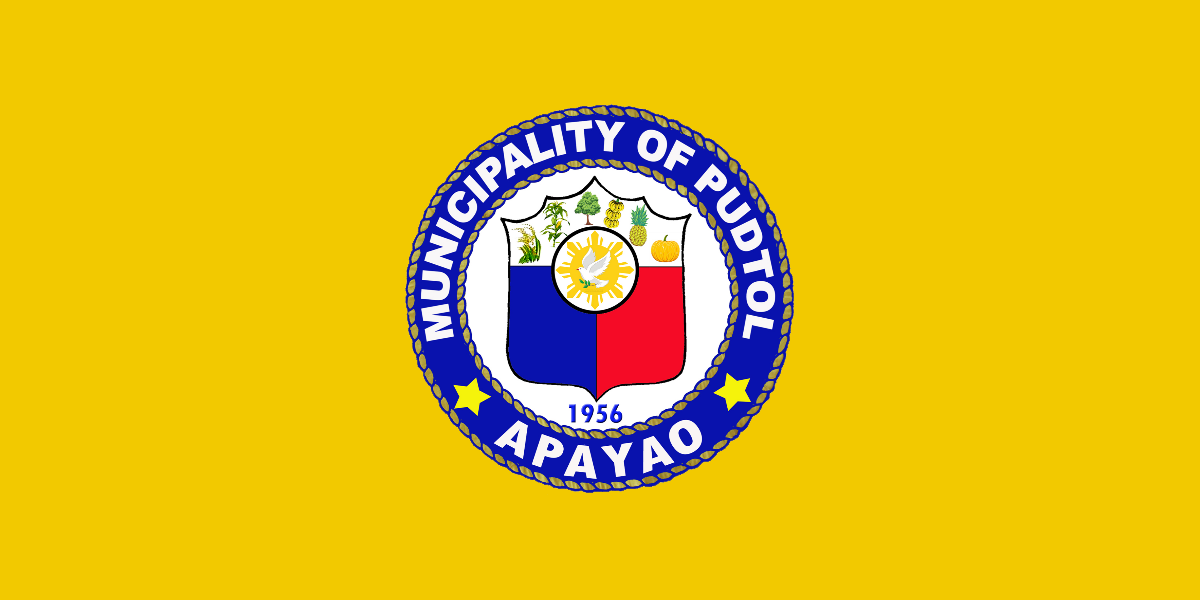
- Flag

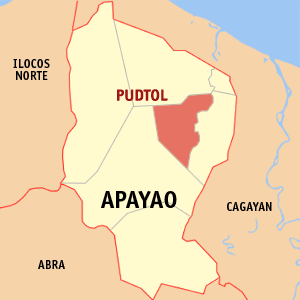
- Map of Apayao with Pudtol highlighted
- Interactive map of Pudtol
- Location within the Philippines
- Coordinates: 18°14′08″N 121°22′24″E
- Country: Philippines
- Region: Cordillera Administrative Region
- Province: Apayao
- District: Lone district
- Barangays: 22 (see Barangays)

Government
  - Type: Sangguniang Bayan
  - Mayor: Edmar D. Pascua (NPC)
  - Vice Mayor: Teresita A. Bulsao (NPC)
  - Representative: Eleanor Bulut-Begtang
  - Municipal Council: Members: Ma. Mina Grace A. Sangil; Russell V. Galut; Efleda A. Garde; Maribel L. Sipsip; Cleofil C. Collado; Benigno M. Baydan III; Julian C. Patayan Jr.; Loreto C. Pascua
  - Electorate: 10,316 voters (2025)

Area
  - Total: 401.02 km^{2} (154.83 sq mi)
- Elevation: 37 m (121 ft)
- Highest elevation: 183 m (600 ft)
- Lowest elevation: 6 m (20 ft)

Population (2024 census)
  - Total: 15,676
  - Density: 39.090/km^{2} (101.24/sq mi)
  - Households: 3,608

Economy
  - Income class: 2nd municipal income class
  - Poverty incidence: 7.23% (2023)
  - Revenue: ₱ 182.8 million (2024)
  - Assets: ₱ 535.8 million (2024)
  - Expenditure: ₱ 176.5 million (2024)
  - Liabilities: ₱ 322.8 million (2024)

Service provider
  - Electricity: Kalinga - Apayao Electric Cooperative (KAELCO)
- Time zone: UTC+8 (PST)
- ZIP code: 3812
- PSGC: 1408106000
- IDD : area code: +63 (0)74
- Native languages: Atta; Isnag; Ilocano; Tagalog

Pudtol, officially the Municipality of Pudtol, (Ilocano: Ili ti Pudtol; Tagalog: Bayan ng Pudtol), is a municipality in the province of Apayao, Philippines. According to the 2024 census, it has a population of 15,676 people.

== History ==
Pudtol, taken from Luna, was created as a municipal district on December 3, 1956, through executive order no. 217.

Prior to its creation, Pudtol was once the center of the Spanish mission in the entire province of Apayao and served as the center of Catholicism in the province.

Pudtol consisted of the last remaining territories of the municipal district of Tauit (the first sub-provincial capital of Apayao), which was abolished on January 21, 1936, through EO No. 13 and annexed as a single barrio to Luna. Tauit also comprised the present-day municipalities of Luna, Santa Marcela, Flora, and some parts of Lasam, Allacapan, and Pamplona, Cagayan.

Barangays Aga, Cacalaggan, Malibang and Mataguisi are comprised by then-Barrio Tawit, Tauit's seat of government.

On March 31, 1959, Pudtol was converted into a municipality by virtue of Executive Order No. 335. It became the first regular municipality in the entire sub-province of Apayao.

On June 22, 1963, via Republic Act No. 3672, several barrios and sitios were separated from Pudtol and constituted into the newly created municipality of Flora.

== Tauit ==
Tauit (later spelled as Tawit), is an Isneg settlement along the lower Apayao-Abulug River. It was a former municipal district and served as Apayao's first sub-provincial capital from July 13, 1907, until the capital was moved to Kabugao on August 1, 1915, by virtue of Executive Order No. 45 signed by Governor-General Francis Burton Harrison. It had been existed by the time of creation of the sub-province of Apayao.

Tauit is said to be the forerunner of the present-day Pudtol. Its seat of government at Barrio Tawit was later divided into four barangays in the municipality.

In 1913, a band of Isneg attacked Tauit, as they were infuriated by the large number of Ilocano settling in the territory under the protection of the local government.

In 1926, Allacapan was founded as its municipal district. On July 1, 1927, the area was separated from Tauit and was organized into an independent one with the same name by virtue of EO No. 68. It was ceded to the province of Cagayan in 1928.

In 1929, a separate municipal district taken from Tauit, Macatel (later renamed Luna through a resolution), was organized through EO No. 200.

Difficulties in transportation led to the decision to abandon Tauit as a municipal district and to be represented by Luna.

Tauit was abolished through EO No. 13, issued on January 21, 1936, and effective February 1, with remaining territories annexed as a single barrio to Luna. These territories were established as the municipal district of Pudtol upon its creation on December 3, 1956, through EO No. 217.

Parts of the territories of Pudtol and Luna were later established as the municipalities of Flora and Santa Marcela; meanwhile, Tauit also comprised some parts of Lasam and Pamplona, Cagayan.

== Geography ==
According to the Philippine Statistics Authority, the municipality has a land area of 411.371 square kilometres (158.831 sq mi) constituting 9.32% of the 4,413.35-square-kilometre- (1,704.00 sq mi) total area of Apayao.

Pudtol is situated 79.83 kilometres (49.60 mi) from the provincial capital Kabugao, and 626.46 kilometres (389.26 mi) from the country's capital city of Manila.

=== Barangays ===
Pudtol is politically subdivided into 22 barangays. Each barangay consists of puroks and some have sitios.

PSGC	Barangay	Population			±% p.a.	
		2024		2010		
148106001	Aga	2.2%	346	276	▴	1.58%
148106002	Alem	5.6%	881	875	▴	0.05%
148106022	Amado	4.9%	761	791	▾	−0.27%
148106023	Aurora	2.9%	450	296	▴	2.95%
148106006	Cabatacan	10.1%	1,588	1,313	▴	1.33%
148106007	Cacalaggan	3.6%	565	405	▴	2.34%
148106009	Capannikian	8.9%	1,388	1,192	▴	1.06%
148106024	Doña Loreta	4.8%	745	711	▴	0.32%
148106025	Emilia	3.2%	502	427	▴	1.13%
148106026	Imelda	4.0%	623	552	▴	0.84%
148106010	Lower Maton	2.7%	423	345	▴	1.42%
148106027	Lt. Balag	1.3%	206	176	▴	1.10%
148106028	Lydia	3.6%	565	529	▴	0.46%
148106012	Malibang	4.2%	654	472	▴	2.29%
148106014	Mataguisi	7.0%	1,094	807	▴	2.13%
148106016	Poblacion	5.6%	883	836	▴	0.38%
148106017	San Antonio (Pugo)	1.5%	241	171	▴	2.41%
148106029	San Jose	2.1%	333	361	▾	−0.56%
148106030	San Luis	5.2%	809	683	▴	1.18%
148106031	San Mariano	2.0%	309	463	▾	−2.77%
148106020	Swan	10.9%	1,708	1,253	▴	2.17%
148106021	Upper Maton	2.7%	417	371	▴	0.81%
	Total		15,676	13,305	▴	1.14%

=== Climate ===
The municipality falls under the Coronas type III climate where dry and wet season is not very much pronounced. Dry season is usually observed from the months of February to July while wet season is felt during the months of August to January. However, there are cases when rainy season occurs early and happens towards the end of May.

Climate data for Pudtol, Apayao
Month	Jan	Feb	Mar	Apr	May	Jun	Jul	Aug	Sep	Oct	Nov	Dec	Year
Mean daily maximum °C (°F)	25 (77)	26 (79)	28 (82)	31 (88)	31 (88)	31 (88)	30 (86)	30 (86)	30 (86)	28 (82)	27 (81)	25 (77)	29 (83)
Mean daily minimum °C (°F)	20 (68)	20 (68)	21 (70)	22 (72)	24 (75)	25 (77)	24 (75)	24 (75)	24 (75)	23 (73)	22 (72)	21 (70)	23 (73)
Average precipitation mm (inches)	120 (4.7)	77 (3.0)	62 (2.4)	40 (1.6)	118 (4.6)	138 (5.4)	162 (6.4)	173 (6.8)	143 (5.6)	198 (7.8)	185 (7.3)	248 (9.8)	1,664 (65.4)
Average rainy days	16.9	12.2	11.5	10.6	18.7	20.1	21.2	23.3	20.8	16.9	16.5	20.0	208.7
Source: Meteoblue

== Demographics ==
Population census of Pudtol
Year	Pop.	±% p.a.
1960	7,720	—
1970	5,735	−2.93%
1975	6,547	+2.69%
1980	7,598	+3.02%
1990	7,621	+0.03%
1995	8,656	+2.41%
2000	11,039	+5.35%
2007	12,595	+1.84%
2010	13,305	+2.02%
2015	14,925	+2.21%
2020	15,491	+0.79%
2024	15,676	+0.29%
Source: Philippine Statistics Authority

The creation and separation of the municipality of Flora in 1963 resulted to a population decrease and a negative growth rate in 1970. The table shows significant increase in population in the succeeding censal years until the latest census.

In the 2024 census, Pudtol had a population of 15,676 people. The population density was 39 inhabitants per square kilometre (100/sq mi).

== Economy ==
Poverty incidence of Pudtol (%)

Source: Philippine Statistics Authority

The economy of Pudtol primarily relies on agriculture, forestry, and tourism. Rice and corn serve as the main agricultural staples of Pudtol. The municipality is known for specialized crops such as pineapples, bananas, root crops, and fruit-bearing trees. The farmers are raising small-scale livestock and poultry.

Pudtol is mainly known for forests that cover 70% of Pudtol's total land area. The tourism of Pudtol represents farm tourism sites and river attractions.

== Government ==
=== Local government ===
Pudtol, belonging to the lone congressional district of the province of Apayao, is governed by a mayor designated as its local chief executive and by a municipal council as its legislative body in accordance with the Local Government Code. The mayor, vice mayor, and the councilors are elected directly by the people through an election which is being held every three years.

=== Elected officials ===
Members of the Municipal Council (2025-2028)
Position	Name
Congressman	Eleanor C. Bulut-Begtang
Mayor	Edmar D. Pascua
Vice-Mayor	Teresita A. Bulsao
Councilors	Benigno M. Baydan III
Councilors	Ma. Mina Grace A. Sangil
Councilors	Russell V. Galut
Councilors	Efleda A. Garde
Councilors	Loreto C. Pascua
Councilors	Maribel L. Sipsip
Councilors	Cleofil C. Collado
Councilors	Julian C. Patayan Jr.
LnB President	Brando S. Adriano
IP Mandatory Representative	Edaño T. Patayan
SK Fed. Pres.	Lyndyll John C. Lorenzo

=== List of Mayors of Pudtol ===
From the time Pudtol was established as a distinct and independent municipality, its governance has been entrusted to a Chief Executive, either appointed or elected.

The following are the list of elected or appointed mayors of Pudtol.

Municipal Mayors of Pudtol (1957–Present)
Name	Term
Emilia Almazan	1957 - 1960
Juan Madriaga	1960 - 1963
Antonio Jadsac	1963 - 1980
Domingo Agngarayngay	1980 - 1986
Robert Bangay	1986 –1987
Russel Caluducan	1987 - 1988
Batara P. Laoat	1988 - 1995
Johnny U. Ilayat	1995 - 2007
Batara P. Laoat	2007 - 2016
Hector Reuel D. Pascua	2016 - 2025
Edmar D. Pascua	2025 – Present

=== List of Vice-Mayors of Pudtol ===
The following are the list of elected or appointed vice-mayors of Pudtol.

Municipal Vice Mayors of Pudtol (1957–Present)
Name	Term
Joaquin Pascua Sr.	1957 - 1960
Fernando M. Diaz	1960 - 1963
Serverino Caluducan	1963 - 1968
Felimon Caluducan	1968 - 1979
Domingo Agngarayngay	1979 - 1980
Lydia A. Bancod	1980 - 1986
Florentino Galut	1986 - 1987
Severino Saquiton	1987 - 1988
Roman Balliente	1988 - 1992
Johnny U. Ilayat	1992 - 1995
Mino A. Babayan	1995 - 1998
Edaño T. Patayan	1998 - 2007
Cleofil C. Collado	2007 - 2010
Loreto C. Pascua	2010 - 2016
Randy A. Laoat	2016 - 2025
Teresita A. Bulsao	2025–Present

== Education ==
The Pudtol Schools District Office governs all educational institutions within the municipality. It oversees the management and operations of all private and public, from primary to secondary schools.

=== Primary and elementary schools ===
- Aga Elementary School
- Alem Elementary School
- Aurora Elementary School
- Cabatacan Elementary School
- Cacalaggan Elementary School
- Capannikian Elementary School
- Dona Loreta Elementary School
- Lower Maton Elementary School
- Lt. Balag Elementary School
- Lydia Elementary School
- Malibang Elementary School
- Mataguisi Elementary School
- Pudtol Central School
- San Jose Elementary School
- San Mariano Elementary School
- Swan Elementary School
- Upper Maton Elementary School
- Upper Swan Elementary School

=== Secondary schools ===
- Mataguisi Comprehensive High School
- Pudtol Vocational High School
- Swan National Agricultural and Trade High School
- Santo Rosario School of Pudtol
- Tawit National High School
