= Calanasan =

Municipality in Apayao, Philippines

Calanasan Bayag
- Municipality
- Municipality of Calanasan
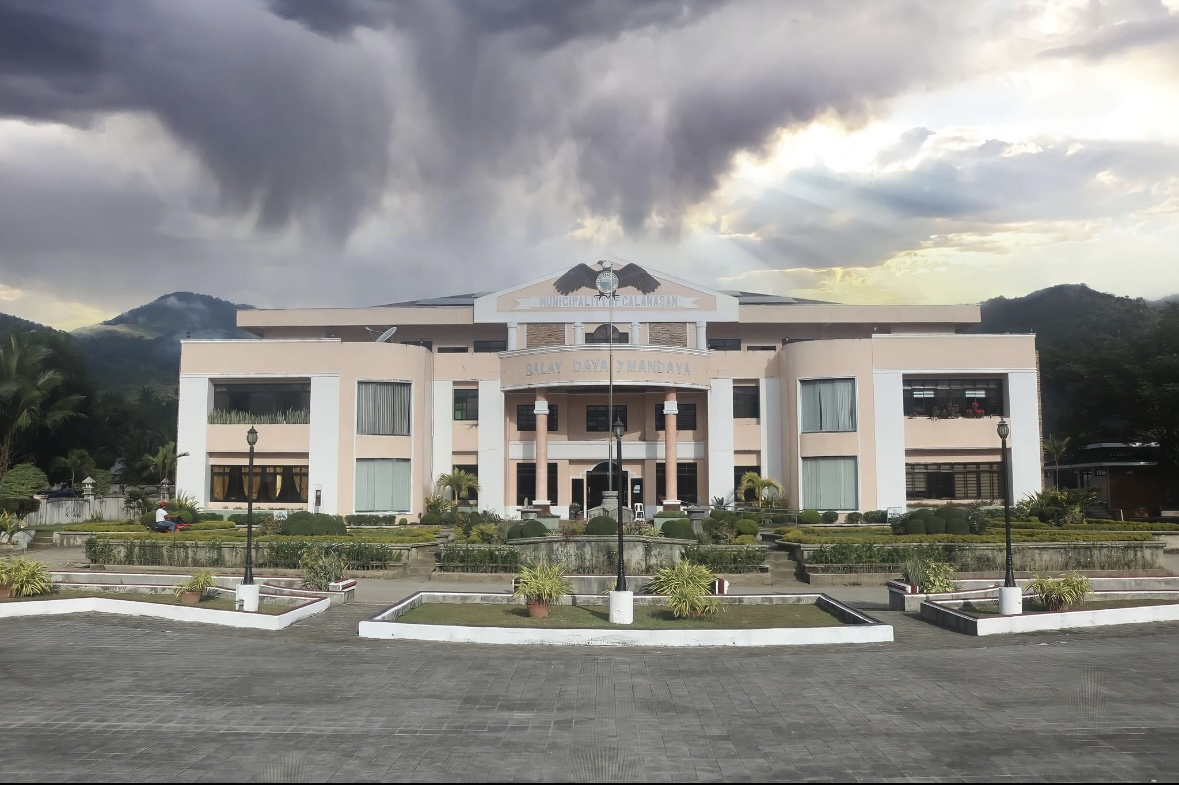
- Municipal Hall (Balay daya Ymandaya Bldg.)

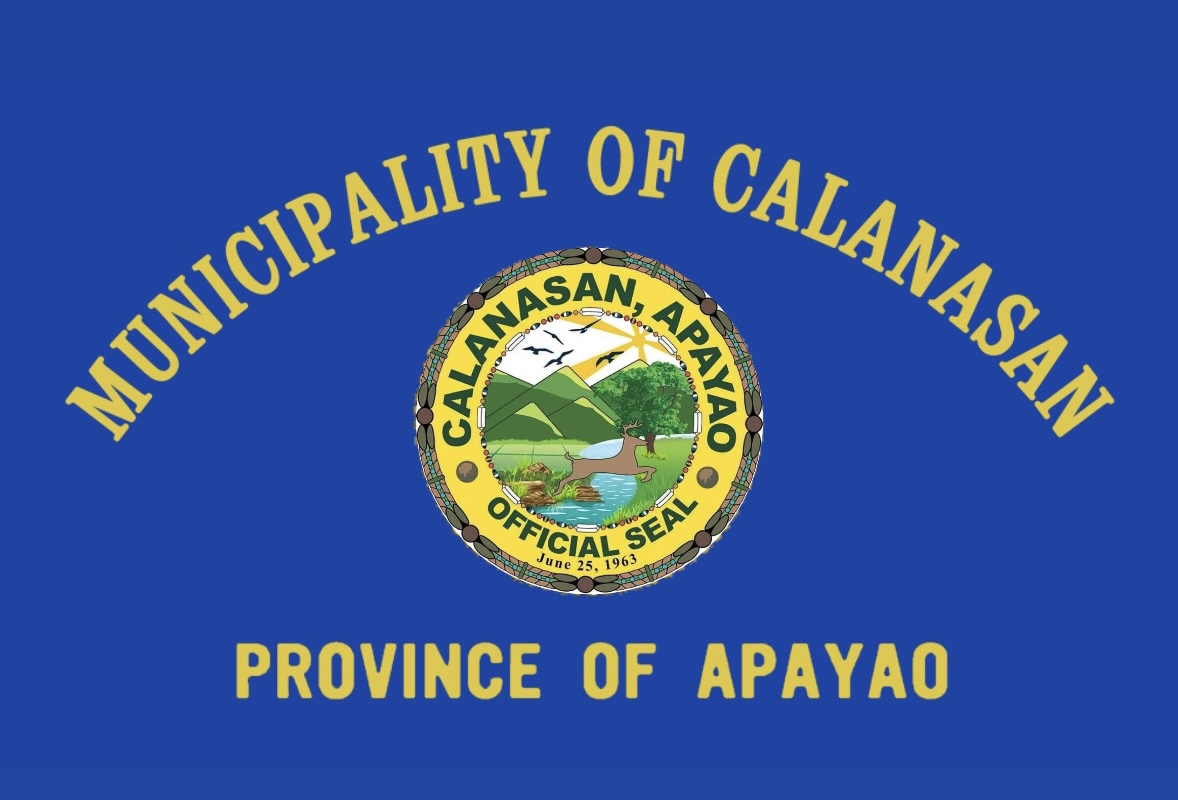
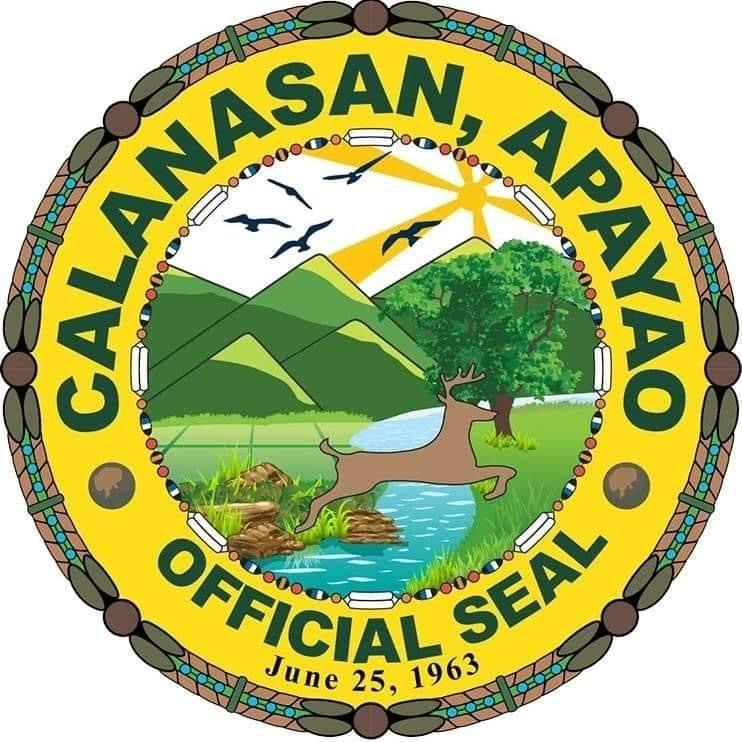
- Flag Seal

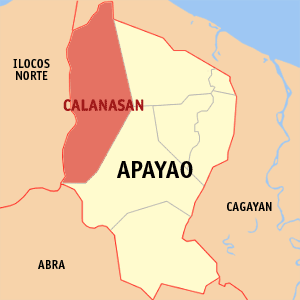
- Map of Apayao with Calanasan highlighted
- Interactive map of Calanasan
- Location in the Philippines
- Coordinates: 18°15′18″N 121°02′37″E
- Country: Philippines
- Region: Cordillera Administrative Region
- Province: Apayao
- District: Lone district
- Founded: June 25, 1963
- Barangays: 18 (see Barangays)

Government
  - Type: Sangguniang Bayan
  - Mayor: Shamir M. Bulut (NP)
  - Vice Mayor: Martin Lucero B. Lawat (NP)
  - Representative: Eleanor Bulut-Begtang
  - Municipal Council: Members: Florante T. Parandit; Jordy M. Allag; Harold Cliff L. Danggan; Vernie S. Batil; Rodante B. Labueng; Irene U. Iddaro; Gerry M. Andres; Scott L. Sucbot
  - Electorate: 9,061 voters (2025)

Area
  - Total: 1,256.15 km^{2} (485.00 sq mi)
- Elevation: 554 m (1,818 ft)
- Highest elevation: 1,220 m (4,000 ft)
- Lowest elevation: 258 m (846 ft)

Population (2024 census)
  - Total: 12,176
  - Density: 9.6931/km^{2} (25.105/sq mi)
  - Households: 2,607

Economy
  - Income class: 1st municipal income class
  - Poverty incidence: 7.64% (2023)
  - Revenue: ₱ 593.7 million (2024)
  - Assets: ₱ 1,197 million (2024)
  - Expenditure: ₱ 356.2 million (2024)
  - Liabilities: ₱ 92.1 million (2024)

Service provider
  - Electricity: Kalinga - Apayao Electric Cooperative (KAELCO)
- Time zone: UTC+8 (PST)
- ZIP code: 3814
- PSGC: 1408101000
- IDD : area code: +63 (0)74
- Native languages: Isnag; Ilocano; Tagalog

Calanasan, officially the Municipality of Calanasan, (Isnag: Ili naya Calanasan; Ilocano: Ili ti Calanasan; Tagalog: Bayan ng Calanasan), (formerly known as Bayag, meaning "slow") is a municipality in the province of Apayao, Philippines. According to the 2024 census, it has a population of 12,176 people.

The town is the source of the Apayao River which empties into the West Philippine Sea and is the only navigable river in Apayao.

== Geography ==
According to the Philippine Statistics Authority, the municipality has a land area of 1,256.15 square kilometres (485.00 sq mi) constituting 28.46% of the 4,413.35-square-kilometre- (1,704.00 sq mi) total area of Apayao. Making it the largest municipality in the province.

Calanasan is located in the north-western section of Apayao bordering Santa Praxedes and Claveria in the north, Adams, Vintar, and Carasi in the west, Solsona and Nueva Era in the south-west, Kabugao on the south, and Luna and some parts of Kabugao on the east.

The town's topography or slope is predominantly rugged and mountainous with sporadic flood plains and plateaus. The municipality cradles the larger part of the Apayao-Abulog watershed area as the main source of streams that fills the mighty river which originates from the municipality.

Calanasan is situated 67.05 kilometres (41.66 mi) from the provincial capital Kabugao, and 571.24 kilometres (354.95 mi) from the country's capital city of Manila.

=== Barangays ===
Calanasan is politically subdivided into 18 regular barangays and 2 Administrative barangays namely; Barangay Parina and Bucarot under its mother barangay Tanglagan. Each barangay consists of puroks and some have sitios.

PSGC	Barangay	Population			±% p.a.	
		2024		2010		
148101001	Butao	6.5%	792	672	▴	1.15%
148101002	Cadaclan	7.7%	940	437	▴	5.47%
148101013	Don Roque Ablan Sr.	1.8%	223	273	▾	−1.40%
148101014	Eleazar	1.2%	145	121	▴	1.27%
148101015	Eva Puzon	8.7%	1,063	1,072	▾	−0.06%
148101016	Kabugawan	3.7%	450	484	▾	−0.51%
148101003	Langnao	1.9%	230	164	▴	2.38%
148101004	Lubong	4.2%	510	612	▾	−1.26%
148101017	Macalino	3.0%	371	265	▴	2.37%
148101005	Naguilian	3.1%	381	389	▾	−0.14%
148101006	Namaltugan	7.7%	941	924	▴	0.13%
148101007	Poblacion	17.0%	2,073	1,939	▴	0.47%
148101008	Sabangan	3.5%	432	379	▴	0.91%
148101018	Santa Elena	2.1%	253	221	▴	0.94%
148101009	Santa Filomena	7.4%	896	859	▴	0.29%
148101011	Tanglagan	16.4%	1,991	1,951	▴	0.14%
148101012	Tubang	3.8%	468	411	▴	0.91%
148101010	Tubongan	3.2%	391	395	▾	−0.07%
	Total		12,176	12,550	▾	−0.21%

=== Climate ===
Calanasan has two pronounced seasons, the dry and the wet seasons. The dry season starts in the latest part of December and ends in the middle part of June. The wet season starts in July and ends in the middle part of December. The hottest month is May and rainfall is heaviest in August while strong typhoons usually occur within the period of August to October and the December used to be the coolest month.

Climate data for Calanasan, Apayao
Month	Jan	Feb	Mar	Apr	May	Jun	Jul	Aug	Sep	Oct	Nov	Dec	Year
Mean daily maximum °C (°F)	24 (75)	26 (79)	28 (82)	30 (86)	29 (84)	29 (84)	28 (82)	28 (82)	28 (82)	27 (81)	26 (79)	24 (75)	27 (81)
Mean daily minimum °C (°F)	18 (64)	18 (64)	19 (66)	21 (70)	23 (73)	23 (73)	23 (73)	23 (73)	22 (72)	21 (70)	20 (68)	19 (66)	21 (69)
Average precipitation mm (inches)	55 (2.2)	41 (1.6)	37 (1.5)	41 (1.6)	184 (7.2)	215 (8.5)	261 (10.3)	256 (10.1)	245 (9.6)	216 (8.5)	142 (5.6)	129 (5.1)	1,822 (71.8)
Average rainy days	14.1	11.1	11.8	12.5	21.8	25.2	25.5	24.9	23.8	18.2	16.4	17.0	222.3
Source: Meteoblue (Use with caution: this is modeled/calculated data, not measured locally.)

== Demographics ==
Population census of Calanasan
Year	Pop.	±% p.a.
1918	2,509	—
1939	2,743	+0.43%
1948	3,550	+2.91%
1960	3,740	+0.44%
1970	5,214	+3.37%
1975	5,727	+1.90%
1980	5,556	−0.60%
1990	10,699	+6.77%
1995	11,679	+1.66%
2000	12,806	+1.99%
2007	9,663	−3.81%
2010	11,568	+6.77%
2015	12,604	+1.65%
2020	12,550	−0.09%
2024	12,176	−0.72%
Source: Philippine Statistics Authority

In the 2024 census, Calanasan had a population of 12,176 people. The population density was 9.7 inhabitants per square kilometre (25/sq mi).

Calanasan is dominated by the Isnags, living with them are the Ilocanos and Kalingas.

=== Languages ===
The main languages spoken are Isnag and Ilocano.

== Economy ==
Poverty incidence of Calanasan (%)

Source: Philippine Statistics Authority

Economic activity in the municipality is based on agricultural production like farming and fishing and livelihood activities like basketry, soft broom making and furniture making.

The municipality has no level lands for extensive rice production except in the northern part of the municipality. The total land area devoted to agriculture is 45.316 hectares (111.98 acres) in which total land area irrigated is 2,347.49 hectares (5,800.8 acres). Its produce include coffee, corn, root crops, peanuts and other legumes, banana, pineapple and some vegetables.

== Government ==
=== Local government ===
Calanasan, belonging to the lone congressional district of the province of Apayao, is governed by a mayor designated as its local chief executive and by a municipal council as its legislative body in accordance with the Local Government Code.

The mayor, vice mayor, and the councilors are elected directly by the people through an election which is being held every three years.

There are also two ex officio councilors – the municipal chapter presidents of the Liga ng mga Barangay and the Pederasyon ng Sangguniang Kabataan. In Calanasan they have reserved seat for the IP Representative as their sectoral representative which is pursuant to the Republic Act 8371, or the Indigenous Peoples (IP) Rights Act of 1997, that calls for the mandatory representation of IPs and it is formally certified by the concerned NCIP regional director, upon recommendation of the provincial or community service center head and shall serve for a period of three years from the date of assumption to office and can be re-endorsed for another term. Members may not serve for more than three consecutive terms.

=== Elected officials ===
Members of the Municipal Council (2025-2028)
Position	Name
Congresswoman	Eleanor C. Bulut-Begtang
Governor	Elias C. Bulut Jr.
Mayor	Shamir M. Bulut
Vice-Mayor	Martin Lucero B. Lawat
Councilors	Florante T. Parandit
Councilors	Jordy M. Allag
Councilors	Harold Cliff L. Danggan
Councilors	Rodante B. Labueng
Councilors	Irene U. Iddaro
Councilors	Vernie S. Batil
Councilors	Gerry M. Andres
Councilors	Scott L. Sucbot
Ex-Officio Member/ ABC President	Fermin C. Mangalao
Ex-Officio Member/ SK Federation President	Jess Lee B. Danggan
Sectoral Representative/ IPMR	Denvert K. Andres

== Tourism ==
The town has vast variety of wild flora and fauna which contributes to its eco-tourism potential. The town is surrounded with virgin forests, cascading waterfalls, and clear rivers.

Potential tourist attractions include:

- Apayao River — Poblacion
- Girgirra’ Falls — Ninoy Aquino
- Ziwanan River — Cadaclan
- Maxibab Falls — Santa Filomena
- Carmella Falls — Eva
- Pisong Lake
- Danao Lake — Sitio Danao, Poblacion
- Purit Cave
- Bantay Malingudu — Poblacion
- Agamata National Park and Wildlife Sanctuary — near the Ilocos Norte boundary, was established in the remote area of sharp peaks and plateaus. This undeveloped area, with pine stands, lush vegetation and mossy forest, affords a panoramic view of Ilocos Norte and Laoag City on the west. It is ideal for hiking, camping, nature tripping and bird watching.
- Blue Haven — Sta. Elena
- Mount Kilang — Butao
- Mount Sicapoo — Butao
- Botbotan Lake — Tanglagan

== Festivals ==
=== Lapat Festival ===
- The Lapat Festival celebrates the ancient Isnag practice known as the Lapat system, a revered indigenous method of environmental stewardship. This traditional approach focuses on managing and preserving natural resources and has significantly contributed to increasing the population of the critically endangered Philippine Eagle. The festival highlights the Isnag people's commitment to sustainable development and environmental conservation through the Lapat system, which is cherished as the most beloved practice for protecting and conserving indigenous resources.
- The Lapat Festival was first held as part of Calanasan's commemoration of its founding anniversary and in honor of its conversion as a regular municipality on June 25, 1963, by virtue of Executive Order No. 43. The event includes various activities such as cultural performances, sports competitions, trade and tourism fairs, Calanasan's Got Talent, the Street Dance Competition, and recognition ceremonies, emphasizing both cultural heritage and sustainable tourism. The festival also features the most awaited part, the "Search for Taram se Dam-ag naya Calanasan."

=== Search for Taram se Dam-ag Naya Calanasan ===
- Held during the last day of the town's annual fiesta (usually in the month of June) is the local beauty pageant known as Taram se Dam-ag Naya Calanasan. (Note: The 'Taram' title was only added in the pageant in the 2024 edition.) Representatives from each barangay, grouped into designated clusters, compete for the coveted title of "Taram" (male) "Dam-ag" (female). The winner has the honor of representing Calanasan in the following year's Taer ken Dayag Ti Apayao, held during the provincial founding anniversary every February.

=== Say-Am Festival ===
Say-am: The Isnag's Renowned Celebration and Thanksgiving Say-am is the Isnag people's famous form of celebration and thanksgiving. It is a feast that embodies the traditional way of giving thanks to the Higher Supreme Being, known as "Alawagan," through rituals enriched with vibrant songs, native chants, and dances called "Talip" and "Tad-do." In the past, the celebration of Say-am symbolized status, indicating that a family was respectable and well-to-do. Today, it is celebrated every December 5 in commemoration of the death anniversary of the provincial hero, the late Elias K. Bulut.

== Philippine Eagle Sanctuary ==
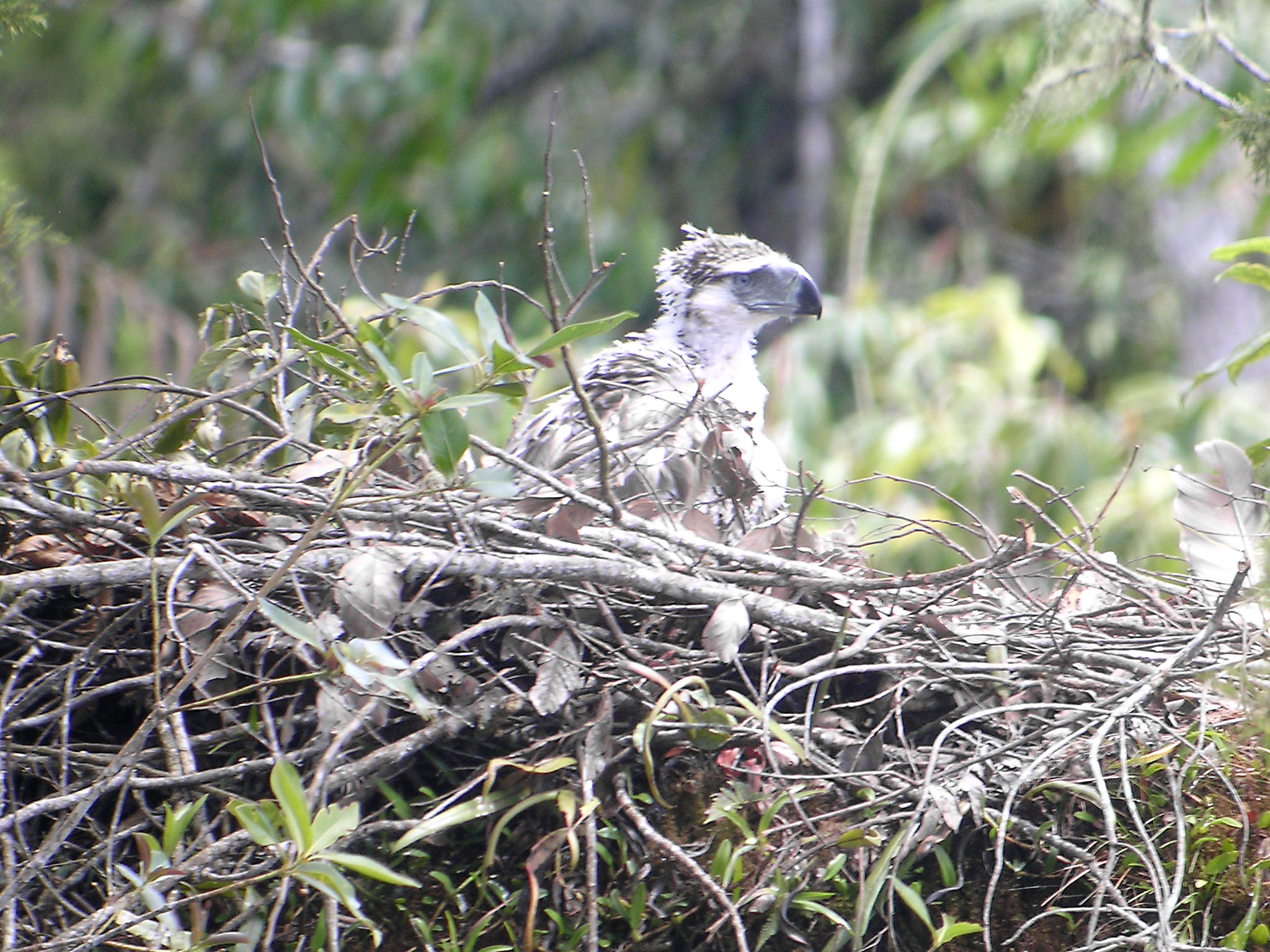
A Philippine eagle nestling

The Philippine Eagle Foundation began its search of eagles in Apayao in 2011 after reports of huge eagles were roaming the area for centuries. On March 22, 2013, scientists discovered the stronghold of critically endangered Philippine eagles, the country's national bird, in Luzon island within the vicinity of the Calanasan Lowland Forest. In January 2015, the town of Calanasan initiated a program which protected 3,000 hectares of forests under its jurisdiction. Additionally, the province of Apayao is one of the very few in the country which has an approved forest land use plan (FLUP). The first active Philippine eagle nest in Apayao was discovered in July 2015.

On 9 July 2018, the provincial government of Apayao announced their intent for the province to be a UNESCO Biosphere Reserve. The province, which possesses more than 286,000 hectares of virgin forests, also noted that they have sent four of their personnel to train in the United States under the US Foreign Service to hasten the declaration of the site. On January 16, 2019, the provincial government announced that they are at the 'legwork for the inscription'.

== Education ==
The Calanasan Schools District Office governs all educational institutions within the municipality. It oversees the management and operations of all private and public, from primary to secondary schools.

=== Primary and elementary schools ===
- Assat Elementary School
- Ayayao Elementary School
- Bucarot Elementary School
- Don Roque Elementary School
- Ferdinand Elementary School
- Kabugawan Elementary School
- Langnao Elementary School
- Macalino Elementary School
- Malitao Elementary School
- Milagrosa Elementary School
- Naguilian Norte Elementary School
- Naguilian Sur Elementary School
- Namaltugan Elementary School
- Ninoy Aquino Elementary School
- Parina Elementary School
- Pedro Bunot Central School
- Sabangan Elementary School
- Salongsong Elementary School
- Soda Elementary School
- Sta. Elena Elementary School
- Sta. Filomena Elementary School
- Tanglagan Elementary School
- Tubongan Elementary School

=== Secondary schools ===
- Apayao Community Learning Center
- Apayao National Industrial Agricultural High School
- Butao Integrated School
- Cadaclan Integrated School
- Calanasan National High School
- Conner Central National High School Main
- Conner National High School
- Cupis National High School
- Guina-ang National High School
- Pio Dalim Memorial School of Arts and Trade Main
- Sta.Filomena School of Arts and Trade
- Talifugo National High School
- Tanglagan National High School
- Tawit National High School

== See also ==
- List of renamed cities and municipalities in the Philippines
