= Mountain Province's 1st congressional district =

Legislative district of the Philippines

- Former constituency for the House of Representatives of the Philippines
- Province: Mountain Province

Former constituency
- Created: 1935 (first creation); 1945 (second creation)
- Abolished: 1943 (first abolition); 1969 (second abolition)

Mountain Province's 1st congressional district was one of the three congressional districts of the Philippines in Mountain Province following its division from the at-large district on two occasions between 1935 and 1969. It was first created in 1935 under Act No. 4203 of the Philippine Legislature for the first elections to the National Assembly and the first under the 1935 Constitution. The district was originally composed of the sub-province of Apayao, and the municipalities of Barlig, Bontoc (including its municipal districts), Natonin, Sabangan, Sadanga, and Sagada, part of the sub-province of Bontoc. It was a single-member district throughout the two legislatures of the Commonwealth National Assembly from 1935 to 1941, before it was dissolved into a two-member at-large district for the National Assembly of the Second Republic. It was later re-created in 1945 and reverted to a single-member district for the first eight legislatures of the House of Representatives from 1945 to 1969.

It was formally abolished in 1969 following the passage of Republic Act No. 4695 in 1966, which created the province of Kalinga-Apayao, together with Benguet, Ifugao, and the smaller Mountain Province. The sub-provinces of Apayao and Kalinga were redistricted to a new at-large district, while the other towns that were part of the sub-province of Bontoc were redistricted to Benguet's at-large district. The district was last represented by Juan M. Duyan of the Liberal Party, who vacated his seat upon his election as governor of Kalinga-Apayao, leaving the district vacant until the end of the 6th Congress.

== List of members representing the district ==
=== National Assembly (1935–1944) ===
==== Commonwealth ====
No.	Portrait	Member	Term of office		Legislature	Party	Electoral history	Constituent LGUs
No.	Portrait	Member	Start	End	Legislature	Party	Electoral history	Constituent LGUs
District created July 23, 1935.
1		Saturnino Moldero	November 25, 1935	December 30, 1941	1st National Assembly	Nacionalista Democratico	Elected in 1935.	1935–1941; Sub-provinces: Apayao, Kalinga Municipalities (part of the sub-province of Bontoc): Barlig, Bontoc, Natonin, Sabangan, Sadanga, Sagada
1		Saturnino Moldero	November 25, 1935	December 30, 1941	2nd National Assembly	Nacionalista	Elected in 1938.	1935–1941; Sub-provinces: Apayao, Kalinga Municipalities (part of the sub-province of Bontoc): Barlig, Bontoc, Natonin, Sabangan, Sadanga, Sagada
District dissolved into Mountain Province's at-large district for the Second Republic National Assembly.

=== House of Representatives (1945–1973) ===
No.	Portrait	Member	Term of office		Legislature	Party	Electoral history	Constituent LGUs
No.	Portrait	Member	Start	End	Legislature	Party	Electoral history	Constituent LGUs
District re-created May 24, 1945.
2		George K. Tait	June 9, 1945	December 30, 1949	1st Commonwealth Congress	Nacionalista	Elected in 1941.	1945–1961; Sub-provinces: Apayao, Kalinga Municipalities (part of the sub-province of Bontoc): Barlig, Bontoc, Natonin, Sabangan, Sadanga, Sagada
2		George K. Tait	June 9, 1945	December 30, 1949	2nd Commonwealth Congress	Nacionalista	Re-elected in 1946.	1945–1961; Sub-provinces: Apayao, Kalinga Municipalities (part of the sub-province of Bontoc): Barlig, Bontoc, Natonin, Sabangan, Sadanga, Sagada
2		George K. Tait	June 9, 1945	December 30, 1949	1st Congress	Nacionalista	Re-elected in 1946.	1945–1961; Sub-provinces: Apayao, Kalinga Municipalities (part of the sub-province of Bontoc): Barlig, Bontoc, Natonin, Sabangan, Sadanga, Sagada
3		Antonio Canao	December 30, 1949	December 30, 1953	2nd Congress	Liberal	Elected in 1949. Election annulled by House electoral tribunal after an electoral protest.	1945–1961; Sub-provinces: Apayao, Kalinga Municipalities (part of the sub-province of Bontoc): Barlig, Bontoc, Natonin, Sabangan, Sadanga, Sagada
4		Juan Bondad	December 30, 1953	December 30, 1957	3rd Congress	Nacionalista	Elected in 1953.	1945–1961; Sub-provinces: Apayao, Kalinga Municipalities (part of the sub-province of Bontoc): Barlig, Bontoc, Natonin, Sabangan, Sadanga, Sagada
5		Juan M. Duyan	December 30, 1957	December 30, 1961	4th Congress	Liberal	Elected in 1957.	1945–1961; Sub-provinces: Apayao, Kalinga Municipalities (part of the sub-province of Bontoc): Barlig, Bontoc, Natonin, Sabangan, Sadanga, Sagada
6		Alfredo Lamen	December 30, 1961 – January 1964	January 1964	5th Congress	Independent	Elected in 1961. Election annulled by House electoral tribunal after an electoral protest.	1945–1961; Sub-provinces: Apayao, Kalinga Municipalities (part of the sub-province of Bontoc): Barlig, Bontoc, Natonin, Sabangan, Sadanga, Sagada
6		Alfredo Lamen	December 30, 1961 – January 1964	January 1964	5th Congress	Independent	Elected in 1961. Election annulled by House electoral tribunal after an electoral protest.	1961–1962; Sub-provinces: Apayao, Kalinga Municipalities (part of the sub-province of Bontoc): Barlig, Bontoc, Natonin, Paracales, Sabangan, Sadanga, Sagada
(5)		Juan M. Duyan	January 27, 1964	December 30, 1967	5th Congress	Liberal	Declared winner of 1961 elections.	1961–1962; Sub-provinces: Apayao, Kalinga Municipalities (part of the sub-province of Bontoc): Barlig, Bontoc, Natonin, Paracales, Sabangan, Sadanga, Sagada
(5)		Juan M. Duyan	January 27, 1964	December 30, 1967	6th Congress	Liberal	Re-elected in 1965. Resigned on election as governor of Kalinga-Apayao.	1961–1962; Sub-provinces: Apayao, Kalinga Municipalities (part of the sub-province of Bontoc): Barlig, Bontoc, Natonin, Paracales, Sabangan, Sadanga, Sagada
(5)		Juan M. Duyan	January 27, 1964	December 30, 1967	6th Congress	Liberal	Re-elected in 1965. Resigned on election as governor of Kalinga-Apayao.	1962–1969; Sub-provinces: Apayao, Kalinga Municipalities (part of the sub-province of Bontoc): Barlig, Bontoc, Natonin, Paracelis, Sabangan, Sadanga, Sagada
Vacant			December 30, 1967	December 30, 1969	6th Congress	—		1962–1969; Sub-provinces: Apayao, Kalinga Municipalities (part of the sub-province of Bontoc): Barlig, Bontoc, Natonin, Paracelis, Sabangan, Sadanga, Sagada
District dissolved into Kalinga-Apayao's at-large and Mountain Province's at-large districts.

== Election results ==
=== 1953 ===
1953 Philippine House of Representatives elections in Mountain Province
Party	Candidate	Votes	%
Nacionalista	Juan Bondad	5,637	21.08
Liberal	Antonio Canao (incumbent)	4,825	18.05
Liberal (ind.)	Pio Marcos	3,760	14.06
Nacionalista	Benito Rafael	3,548	13.27
Nacionalista	Felix Diaz	2,935	10.98
Nacionalista	Francisco Dasayon	2,906	10.87
Liberal	Ceferino Ramirez	864	3.23
Nacionalista	Ducusin Awisi	815	3.05
Liberal	Antonio Gacayon	794	2.97
Nacionalista	Silvestre Vaggas	652	2.44
Total votes		26,736	100.00
Nacionalista gain from Liberal			

=== 1965 ===
1965 Philippine House of Representatives elections in Mountain Province
Party	Candidate	Votes	%
Liberal	Juan Duyan (incumbent)	13,996	42.45
Liberal	Florence Lamen	12,061	36.58
Nacionalista	Tanding Odiem	4,485	13.60
Nacionalista	Felix Diaz Jr.	2,427	7.36
Total votes		32,969	100.00
Liberal hold			

== See also ==
- Legislative districts of Mountain Province
