= Flora, Apayao =

Municipality in Apayao, Philippines

Flora
- Municipality
- Municipality of Flora
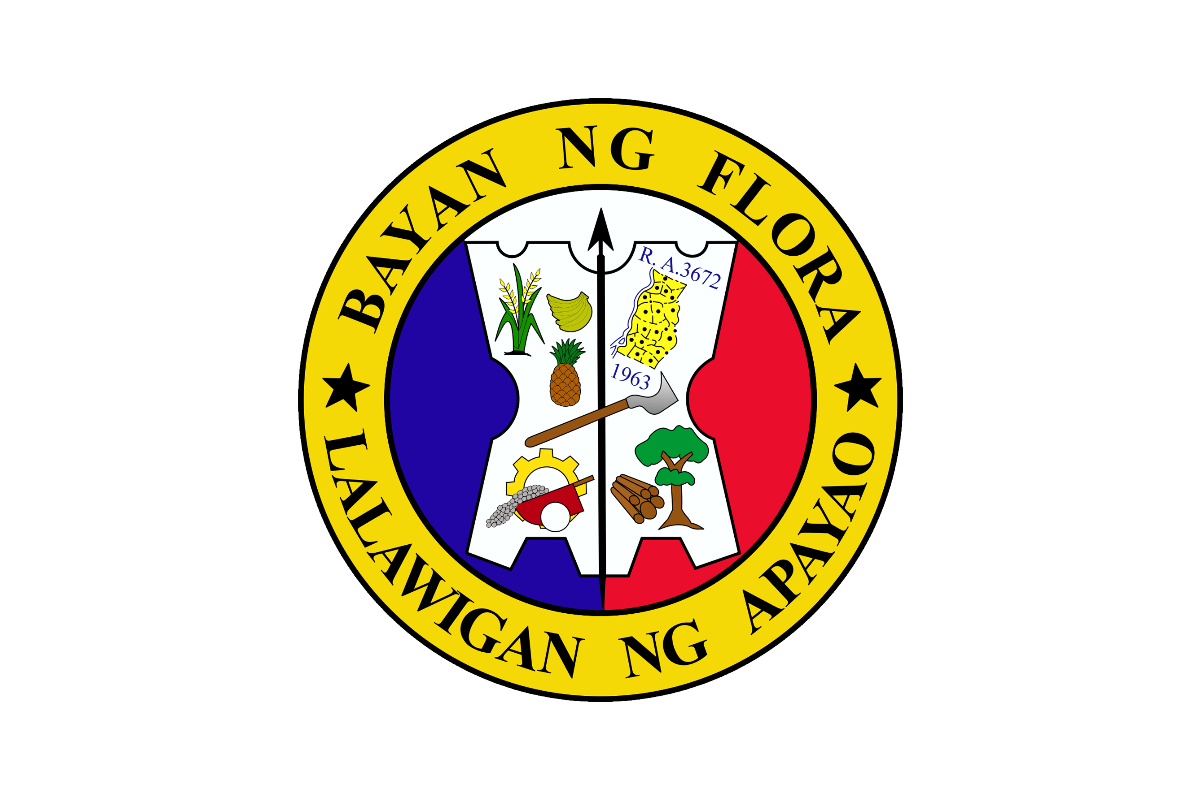
- Flag Seal

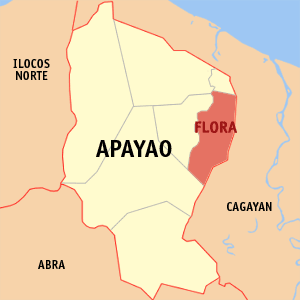
- Map of Apayao, Kalinga-Apayao, Mountain Province with Flora highlighted
- Interactive map of Flora
- Location within the Philippines
- Coordinates: 18°12′53″N 121°25′07″E
- Country: Philippines
- Region: Apayao, Kalinga-Apayao, Mountain Province
- Province: Apayao, Kalinga-Apayao, Mountain Province
- District: Lone district
- Barangays: 16 (see Barangays)

Government
  - Type: Sangguniang Bayan
  - Mayor: Jeofrey T. Blas (Lakas)
  - Vice Mayor: Rodolfo B. Juan Sr. (Lakas)
  - Representative: Eleanor Bulut-Begtang
  - Municipal Council: Members: Manny H. Biggayan; Genevive L. Cacacho; Edison T. Collado; Rodolfo T. Juan Jr.; Godfrey M. Balderama; Jennifer S. Angelo; Jericka L. de San Jose; Nenita P. Aguilar
  - Electorate: 11,855 voters (2025)

Area
  - Total: 324.40 km^{2} (125.25 sq mi)
- Elevation: 34 m (112 ft)
- Highest elevation: 129 m (423 ft)
- Lowest elevation: 9 m (30 ft)

Population (2024 census)
  - Total: 18,271
  - Density: 56.322/km^{2} (145.87/sq mi)
  - Households: 4,559

Economy
  - Income class: 2nd municipal income class
  - Poverty incidence: 7.43% (2023)
  - Revenue: ₱ 289.6 million (2024)
  - Assets: ₱ 600.4 million (2024)
  - Expenditure: ₱ 194 million (2024)
  - Liabilities: ₱ 97.53 million (2024)

Service provider
  - Electricity: Kalinga - Apayao Electric Cooperative (KAELCO)
- Time zone: UTC+8 (PST)
- ZIP code: 3810
- PSGC: 1408103000
- IDD : area code: +63 (0)74
- Native languages: Isnag; Ilocano; Tagalog

Flora, officially the Municipality of Flora (Ilocano: Ili ti Flora; Tagalog: Bayan ng Flora), is a municipality in the province of Apayao, Philippines. According to the 2024 census, it has a population of 18,271 people.

== History ==
Flora was created into a municipality on June 22, 1963, when several barrios and sitios of Pudtol were constituted into the newly created town.

== Geography ==
According to the Philippine Statistics Authority, the municipality has a land area of 324.40 square kilometres (125.25 sq mi) constituting 7.35% of the 4,413.35-square-kilometre- (1,704.00 sq mi) total area of Apayao.

Flora is situated 79.51 kilometres (49.41 mi) from the provincial capital Kabugao, and 600.16 kilometres (372.92 mi) from the country's capital city of Manila.

=== Barangays ===
Flora is politically subdivided into 16 barangays. Each barangay consists of puroks and some have sitios.

PSGC	Barangay	Population			±% p.a.	
		2024		2010		
148103001	Allig	9.1%	1,659	1,507	▴	0.67%
148103002	Anninipan	5.7%	1,033	930	▴	0.73%
148103003	Atok	3.7%	672	584	▴	0.98%
148103004	Bagutong	7.9%	1,442	1,384	▴	0.29%
148103005	Balasi	1.6%	287	238	▴	1.31%
148103006	Balluyan	7.6%	1,390	1,501	▾	−0.53%
148103008	Malayugan	6.9%	1,255	1,290	▾	−0.19%
148103012	Mallig	3.9%	707	538	▴	1.92%
148103009	Malubibit Norte	5.9%	1,069	1,005	▴	0.43%
148103013	Malubibit Sur	3.0%	554	459	▴	1.32%
148103010	Poblacion East	14.5%	2,652	2,598	▴	0.14%
148103014	Poblacion West	11.7%	2,129	2,120	▴	0.03%
148103015	San Jose	4.0%	734	690	▴	0.43%
148103016	Santa Maria	5.7%	1,037	817	▴	1.67%
148103011	Tamalunog	5.6%	1,015	837	▴	1.35%
148103017	Upper Atok (Coliman)	1.7%	309	245	▴	1.63%
	Total		18,271	17,944	▴	0.13%

=== Climate ===
Climate data for Flora, Apayao
Month	Jan	Feb	Mar	Apr	May	Jun	Jul	Aug	Sep	Oct	Nov	Dec	Year
Mean daily maximum °C (°F)	24 (75)	26 (79)	28 (82)	31 (88)	31 (88)	31 (88)	30 (86)	30 (86)	29 (84)	28 (82)	27 (81)	25 (77)	28 (83)
Mean daily minimum °C (°F)	19 (66)	20 (68)	20 (68)	22 (72)	24 (75)	24 (75)	24 (75)	24 (75)	24 (75)	23 (73)	22 (72)	21 (70)	22 (72)
Average precipitation mm (inches)	120 (4.7)	77 (3.0)	62 (2.4)	40 (1.6)	118 (4.6)	138 (5.4)	162 (6.4)	173 (6.8)	143 (5.6)	198 (7.8)	185 (7.3)	248 (9.8)	1,664 (65.4)
Average rainy days	16.9	12.2	11.5	10.6	18.7	20.1	21.2	23.3	20.8	16.9	16.5	20.0	208.7
Source: Meteoblue

== Demographics ==
Population census of Flora
Year	Pop.	±% p.a.
1970	6,510	—
1975	9,380	+7.60%
1980	12,295	+5.56%
1990	10,810	−1.28%
1995	12,310	+2.46%
2000	14,860	+4.12%
2007	16,016	+1.04%
2010	16,743	+1.63%
2015	17,391	+0.73%
2020	17,944	+0.66%
2024	18,271	+0.43%
Source: Philippine Statistics Authority

In the 2024 census, Flora had a population of 18,271 people. The population density was 56 inhabitants per square kilometre (150/sq mi).

=== Religion ===
The dominant religion in the city is Roman Catholic (Saint Joseph Parish in Poblacion East. However, other Christian sectors are also present in Flora such as Iglesia ni Cristo, United Methodist Church.

== Economy ==
Poverty incidence of Flora (%)

Source: Philippine Statistics Authority

Agriculture is the main source of economy in Flora through major crops like rice and corn. Flora is known for producing wooden furniture and woodwork crafts.

== Government ==
=== Local government ===
Flora, belonging to the lone congressional district of the province of Apayao, is governed by a mayor designated as its local chief executive and by a municipal council as its legislative body in accordance with the Local Government Code. The mayor, vice mayor, and the councilors are elected directly by the people through an election which is being held every three years.

=== Elected officials ===
Members of the Municipal Council (2025-2028)
Position	Name
Congressman	Eleanor C. Bulut-Begtang
Mayor	Jeofrey T. Blas
Vice-Mayor	Rodolfo B. Juan Sr.
Councilors	Manny H. Biggayan
Councilors	Genevive L. Cacacho
Councilors	Godfrey M. Balderama
Councilors	Edison T. Collado
Councilors	Rodolfo T. Juan Jr.
Councilors	Jericka L. De San Jose
Councilors	Jennifer S. Angelo
Councilors	Nenita P. Aguilar

== Education ==
The Flora Schools District Office governs all educational institutions within the municipality. It oversees the management and operations of all private and public, from primary to secondary schools.

=== Primary and elementary schools ===
- Allig Elementary School
- Aninipan Elementary School
- Atok Elementary School
- Bagutong Elementary School
- Balasi Elementary School
- Balluyan Elementary School
- Flora Central School
- Flora East Central School
- Greenhills Elementary School
- Malayugan Elementary School
- Mallig Elementary School
- Malubibit Norte Elementary School
- Malubibit Sur Elementary School
- San Jose Elementary School
- Sta. Maria Elementary School
- Tamalunog Elementary School
- Upper Atok Elementary School

=== Secondary schools ===
- Allig National Agricultural and Trade High School
- Flora National High School
- Mayor Ricardo de San Jose, Sr. Comprehensive High School
- St. Joseph High School of Flora
