= Conner, Apayao =

Municipality in Apayao, Philippines

Conner
- Municipality
- Municipality of Conner
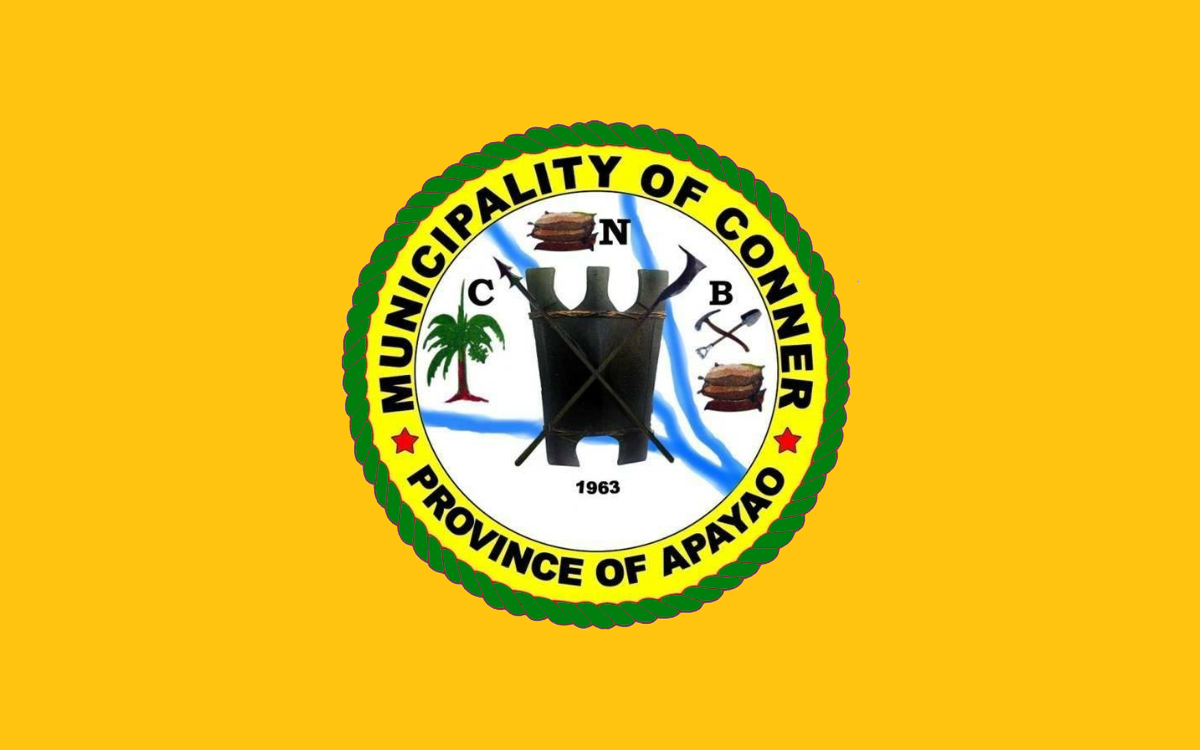
- Flag

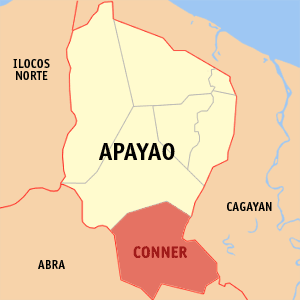
- Map of Apayao with Conner highlighted
- Interactive map of Conner
- Location within the Philippines
- Coordinates: 17°48′31″N 121°17′20″E
- Country: Philippines
- Region: Cordillera Administrative Region
- Province: Apayao
- District: Lone district
- Named for: Norman Conner
- Barangays: 21 (see Barangays)

Government
  - Type: Sangguniang Bayan
  - Mayor: Jorico F. Bayaua (PFP)
  - Vice Mayor: Alexander M. Aswigue (PFP)
  - Representative: Eleanor Bulut-Begtang
  - Municipal Council: Members: Justin Emmanuel B. Begtang; Martina W. Dangoy; Saul D. Delwasen; Ethel S. Buaga; Lloyd S. Gannaban; Artemio L. Gonayon; Lutgarda A. Sison; Marino P. Costales
  - Electorate: 18,566 voters (2025)

Area
  - Total: 694.30 km^{2} (268.07 sq mi)
- Elevation: 174 m (571 ft)
- Highest elevation: 532 m (1,745 ft)
- Lowest elevation: 54 m (177 ft)

Population (2024 census)
  - Total: 28,360
  - Density: 40.85/km^{2} (105.8/sq mi)
  - Households: 6,143

Economy
  - Income class: 1st municipal income class
  - Poverty incidence: 9.87% (2023)
  - Revenue: ₱ 353.3 million (2024)
  - Assets: ₱ 914.8 million (2024)
  - Expenditure: ₱ 334.9 million (2024)
  - Liabilities: ₱ 219.4 million (2024)

Service provider
  - Electricity: Kalinga - Apayao Electric Cooperative (KAELCO)
- Time zone: UTC+8 (PST)
- ZIP code: 3807
- PSGC: 1408102000
- IDD : area code: +63 (0)74
- Native languages: Isnag; Kalinga; Ilocano; Tagalog

Conner, officially the Municipality of Conner (Ilocano: Ili ti Conner; Tagalog: Bayan ng Conner), is a municipality in the province of Apayao, Philippines. According to the 2024 census, it has a population of 28,360 people.

== Etymology ==
The town was named after Norman Conner, an American engineer who oversaw the construction of the main roads within the province of Apayao, effectively ending the isolation of the province from the outside world during the early American era.

== Geography ==
According to the Philippine Statistics Authority, the municipality has a land area of 694.30 square kilometres (268.07 sq mi) constituting 15.73% of the 4,413.35-square-kilometre- (1,704.00 sq mi) total area of Apayao.

Conner is situated 39.05 kilometres (24.26 mi) from the provincial capital Kabugao, and 524.66 kilometres (326.01 mi) from the country's capital city of Manila.

=== Barangays ===
Conner is politically subdivided into 21 barangays. Each barangay consists of puroks and some have sitios.

PSGC	Barangay	Population			±% p.a.	
		2024		2010		
148102001	Allangigan	2.0%	569	424	▴	2.06%
148102018	Banban	4.2%	1,178	1,042	▴	0.85%
148102002	Buluan	6.0%	1,690	1,462	▴	1.01%
148102003	Caglayan (New Poblacion)	8.4%	2,392	1,865	▴	1.74%
148102004	Calafug	3.7%	1,050	906	▴	1.03%
148102005	Cupis	1.6%	456	441	▴	0.23%
148102006	Daga	4.6%	1,316	1,281	▴	0.19%
148102019	Guinaang	5.1%	1,442	1,476	▾	−0.16%
148102007	Guinamgaman	3.8%	1,066	841	▴	1.65%
148102020	Ili	4.6%	1,293	1,195	▴	0.55%
148102008	Karikitan	6.7%	1,901	1,928	▾	−0.10%
148102009	Katablangan	2.3%	650	697	▾	−0.48%
148102010	Malama	11.8%	3,343	2,885	▴	1.02%
148102011	Manag	6.6%	1,878	1,629	▴	0.99%
148102021	Mawegui	2.7%	772	763	▴	0.08%
148102012	Nabuangan	2.0%	578	594	▾	−0.19%
148102013	Paddaoan	5.8%	1,646	1,623	▴	0.10%
148102014	Puguin	2.8%	804	805	▾	−0.01%
148102015	Ripang (Old Poblacion)	3.8%	1,084	841	▴	1.77%
148102016	Sacpil	5.0%	1,408	1,141	▴	1.46%
148102017	Talifugo	3.7%	1,036	972	▴	0.44%
	Total		28,360	27,552	▴	0.20%

=== Climate ===
Climate data for Conner, Apayao
Month	Jan	Feb	Mar	Apr	May	Jun	Jul	Aug	Sep	Oct	Nov	Dec	Year
Mean daily maximum °C (°F)	25 (77)	27 (81)	29 (84)	32 (90)	32 (90)	31 (88)	31 (88)	30 (86)	30 (86)	29 (84)	27 (81)	25 (77)	29 (84)
Mean daily minimum °C (°F)	20 (68)	21 (70)	21 (70)	23 (73)	24 (75)	25 (77)	24 (75)	25 (77)	24 (75)	23 (73)	23 (73)	21 (70)	23 (73)
Average precipitation mm (inches)	109 (4.3)	78 (3.1)	64 (2.5)	54 (2.1)	181 (7.1)	196 (7.7)	204 (8.0)	211 (8.3)	174 (6.9)	198 (7.8)	185 (7.3)	231 (9.1)	1,885 (74.2)
Average rainy days	17.2	13.7	13.2	13.0	21.7	23.4	25.2	25.2	21.9	17.7	18.6	20.8	231.6
Source: Meteoblue

== Demographics ==
Population census of Conner
Year	Pop.	±% p.a.
1918	1,628	—
1939	1,872	+0.67%
1948	2,112	+1.35%
1960	3,750	+4.90%
1970	9,419	+9.64%
1975	12,255	+5.42%
1980	14,196	+2.98%
1990	16,220	+1.34%
1995	17,461	+1.39%
2000	20,429	+3.42%
2007	22,668	+1.44%
2010	24,811	+3.34%
2015	26,051	+0.93%
2020	27,552	+1.19%
2024	28,360	+0.70%
Source: Philippine Statistics Authority

In the 2024 census, Conner had a population of 28,360 people. The population density was 41 inhabitants per square kilometre (110/sq mi).

== Economy ==
Poverty incidence of Conner (%)

Source: Philippine Statistics Authority

Conner features a developing rural economy. The main sources of economy are rice, corn, vegetables, and fruit-bearing trees. Conner produces agricultural innovation and processing such as fruit wines and rice wines.

== Government ==
=== Local government ===
Conner, belonging to the lone congressional district of the province of Apayao, is governed by a mayor designated as its local chief executive and by a municipal council as its legislative body in accordance with the Local Government Code. The mayor, vice mayor, and the councilors are elected directly by the people through an election which is being held every three years.

=== Elected officials ===
Members of the Municipal Council (2025-2028)
Position	Name
Congressman	Eleanor C. Bulut-Begtang
Mayor	Jorico F. Bayaua
Vice-Mayor	Alexander M. Aswigue
Councilors	Justin Emmanuel B. Begtang
Councilors	Martina W. Dangoy
Councilors	Saul D. Delwasen
Councilors	Ethel S. Buaga
Councilors	Lloyd S. Gannaban
Councilors	Artemio L. Gonayon
Councilors	Lutgarda A. Sison
Councilors	Marino P. Costales

== Education ==
There are two schools district offices which govern all educational institutions within the municipality. They oversee the management and operations of all private and public, from primary to secondary schools. These are Northern Conner Schools District Office, and Southern Conner Schools District Office.

=== Primary and elementary schools ===
- Allangigan Elementary School
- Apaya Elementary School
- Banban Elementary School
- Bubog Elementary School
- Buguit Elementary School
- Buneg Elementary School
- Caglayan Elementary School
- Calafug Elementary School
- Catub Elementary School
- Conner Central School
- Cubet Elementary School
- Cupis Elementary School
- Daga Elementary School
- Dangguinan Elementary School
- Gassud Elementary School
- Guedeged Elementary School
- Guina-ang Elementary School
- Guinamgamman Elementary School
- Ili Elementary School
- Karikitan Elementary School
- Liwan Elementary School
- Lower Katablangan Elementary School
- Mabaguio Elementary School
- Mabiga Elementary School
- Manag Elementary School
- Mawigue Elementary School
- Nabuangan Elementary School
- Paddaoan Elementary School
- Paddig Elementary School
- Puguin Elementary School
- Ripang Elementary School
- Sacpil Elementary School
- Southern Conner CS
- Talifugo Elementary School
- Turayok Elementary School
- Upper Katablangan Elementary School

=== Secondary schools ===
- Conner Central National High School - Ripang
- Conner National High School - Buluan
- Cupis National High School
- Gov. Benjamin Leguiab Sr. Memorial National High School
- Guinaang National High School
- Guinamgamman Integrated School
- Ili National High School
- Karikitan Integrated School
- Katablangan Integrated School
- Malama Integrated School
- Paddaoan Integrated School
- Sacpil National High School
- Talifugo National High School

=== Higher educational institution ===
- Apayao State College

== Health ==
Conner is home to a district hospital named after the municipality. In 2025, it was renamed into the Apayao General Hospital and Medical Center. San Juan Medical and Maternity Clinic is a private clinic that caters medical needs of Connerians for decades now.
