= Legislative districts of Kalinga-Apayao =

The legislative district of Kalinga-Apayao was the representation of the historical province of Kalinga-Apayao in the various national legislatures of the Philippines. Since 1998, the province has been represented in the lower house of the Congress of the Philippines through the separate lone congressional districts of Apayao and Kalinga.

== History ==
Prior to gaining separate representation, areas formerly under the jurisdiction of Kalinga-Apayao were represented under the undivided Mountain Province (1917–1969).

The enactment of Republic Act No. 4695 on 18 June 1966 combined the sub-provinces of Apayao and Kalinga into a full-fledged province named Kalinga-Apayao. The new province began electing its separate representative in 1969.

Kalinga-Apayao was represented as part of Region II from 1978 to 1984, and returned one representative, elected at large, to the Regular Batasang Pambansa in 1984.

Under the new Constitution which was proclaimed on 11 February 1987, the province constituted a lone congressional district, and elected its member to the restored House of Representatives starting that same year.

Apayao and Kalinga became separate provinces following the passage and subsequent ratification of Republic Act No. 7878 on May 8, 1995. The new provinces began electing their separate representatives in the 1998 elections.

== Lone District (defunct) ==
Period	Representative
7th Congress; 1969–1972	Felipe B. Almazan
8th Congress; 1987–1992	William F. Claver
9th Congress; 1992–1995	Elias K. Bulut
10th Congress; 1995–1998	Elias K. Bulut

== At-Large (defunct) ==
Period	Representative
Regular Batasang Pambansa; 1984–1986	David M. Puzon

== See also ==
- Legislative district of Apayao
- Legislative district of Kalinga
- Legislative districts of the Mountain Province
