= Apayao's at-large congressional district =

House of Representatives of the Philippines legislative district

- Constituency for the House of Representatives of the Philippines
- Location of Apayao within the Philippines
- Province: Apayao
- Region: Cordillera Administrative Region
- Population: 124,336 (2020)
- Electorate: 83,441 (2025)
- Area: 4,413.35 km^{2} (1,704.00 sq mi)

Current constituency
- Created: 1995
- Representative: Eleanor Begtang
- Political party: NPC
- Congressional bloc: Majority

Apayao's at-large congressional district refers to the lone congressional district of the Philippines in the province of Apayao. It has been represented in the House of Representatives of the Philippines since 1998. It was previously included in Kalinga-Apayao's at-large congressional district from 1969 to 1998. The district is currently represented in the 20th Congress by Eleanor Begtang of the Nationalist People's Coalition (NPC).

== List of members representing the district ==
=== House of Representatives (1987–present) ===
No.	Portrait	Member	Term of office		Legislature	Party	Electoral history	Constituent LGUs
No.	Portrait	Member	Start	End	Legislature	Party	Electoral history	Constituent LGUs
District created February 14, 1995.
1		Elias Bulut Sr.	June 30, 1998	June 30, 2001	11th Congress	Lakas	Redistricted from Kalinga–Apayao district and re-elected in 1998.	1998–present Calanasan, Conner, Flora, Kabugao, Luna, Pudtol, Santa Marcela
2		Elias Bulut Jr.	June 30, 2001	June 30, 2010	12th Congress	NPC	Elected in 2001.	1998–present Calanasan, Conner, Flora, Kabugao, Luna, Pudtol, Santa Marcela
2		Elias Bulut Jr.	June 30, 2001	June 30, 2010	13th Congress	NPC	Re-elected in 2004.	1998–present Calanasan, Conner, Flora, Kabugao, Luna, Pudtol, Santa Marcela
2		Elias Bulut Jr.	June 30, 2001	June 30, 2010	14th Congress	NPC	Re-elected in 2007.	1998–present Calanasan, Conner, Flora, Kabugao, Luna, Pudtol, Santa Marcela
3		Eleanor Begtang	June 30, 2010	June 30, 2019	15th Congress	NPC	Elected in 2010.	1998–present Calanasan, Conner, Flora, Kabugao, Luna, Pudtol, Santa Marcela
3		Eleanor Begtang	June 30, 2010	June 30, 2019	16th Congress	NPC	Re-elected in 2013.	1998–present Calanasan, Conner, Flora, Kabugao, Luna, Pudtol, Santa Marcela
3		Eleanor Begtang	June 30, 2010	June 30, 2019	17th Congress	NPC	Re-elected in 2016.	1998–present Calanasan, Conner, Flora, Kabugao, Luna, Pudtol, Santa Marcela
(2)		Elias Bulut Jr.	June 30, 2019	June 30, 2022	18th Congress	NPC	Re-elected in 2019.	1998–present Calanasan, Conner, Flora, Kabugao, Luna, Pudtol, Santa Marcela
(3)		Eleanor Begtang	June 30, 2022	Incumbent	19th Congress	NPC	Elected in 2022.	1998–present Calanasan, Conner, Flora, Kabugao, Luna, Pudtol, Santa Marcela
(3)		Eleanor Begtang	June 30, 2022	Incumbent	20th Congress	NPC	Re-elected in 2025.	1998–present Calanasan, Conner, Flora, Kabugao, Luna, Pudtol, Santa Marcela

== Election results ==
=== 1998 ===
1998 Philippine House of Representatives elections in Apayao
Party	Candidate	Votes	%
Lakas	Elias Bulut	23,633	100.00
Total votes		23,633	100.00
Lakas hold			

=== 2013 ===
2013 Philippine House of Representatives elections in Apayao
Party	Candidate	Votes	%
NPC	Eleanor Begtang	32,192	92.14
UNA	Ambaro Sagle	2,747	7.86
Total votes		34,939	100.00
NPC hold			

=== 2016 ===
2016 Philippine House of Representatives elections in Apayao
Party	Candidate	Votes	%
NPC	Eleanor Begtang	40,888	100.00
Valid ballots		40,888	63.03
Invalid or blank votes		23,979	36.97
Total votes		64,867	100.00
NPC hold			

=== 2019 ===
2019 Philippine House of Representatives elections in Apayao
Party	Candidate	Votes	%
NPC	Elias Bulut Jr.	45,630	100.00
Valid ballots		45,630	61.05
Invalid or blank votes		29,113	38.95
Total votes		74,743	100.00
NPC hold			

=== 2022 ===
2022 Philippine House of Representatives elections in Apayao
Party	Candidate	Votes	%
NPC	Eleanor Begtang	50,503	100.00
Valid ballots		50,503	64.37
Invalid or blank votes		27,951	35.63
Total votes		78,454	100.00
NPC hold			

=== 2025 ===
2025 Philippine House of Representatives elections in Apayao
Party	Candidate	Votes	%
NPC	Eleanor Begtang	58,041	100.00
Valid ballots		58,041	80.00
Invalid or blank votes		14,507	20.00
Total votes		72,548	100.00
NPC hold			
