= Luna, Apayao =

Municipality and seat of govenrment of Apayao, Philippines

Luna Macatel
- Municipality
- Municipality of Luna
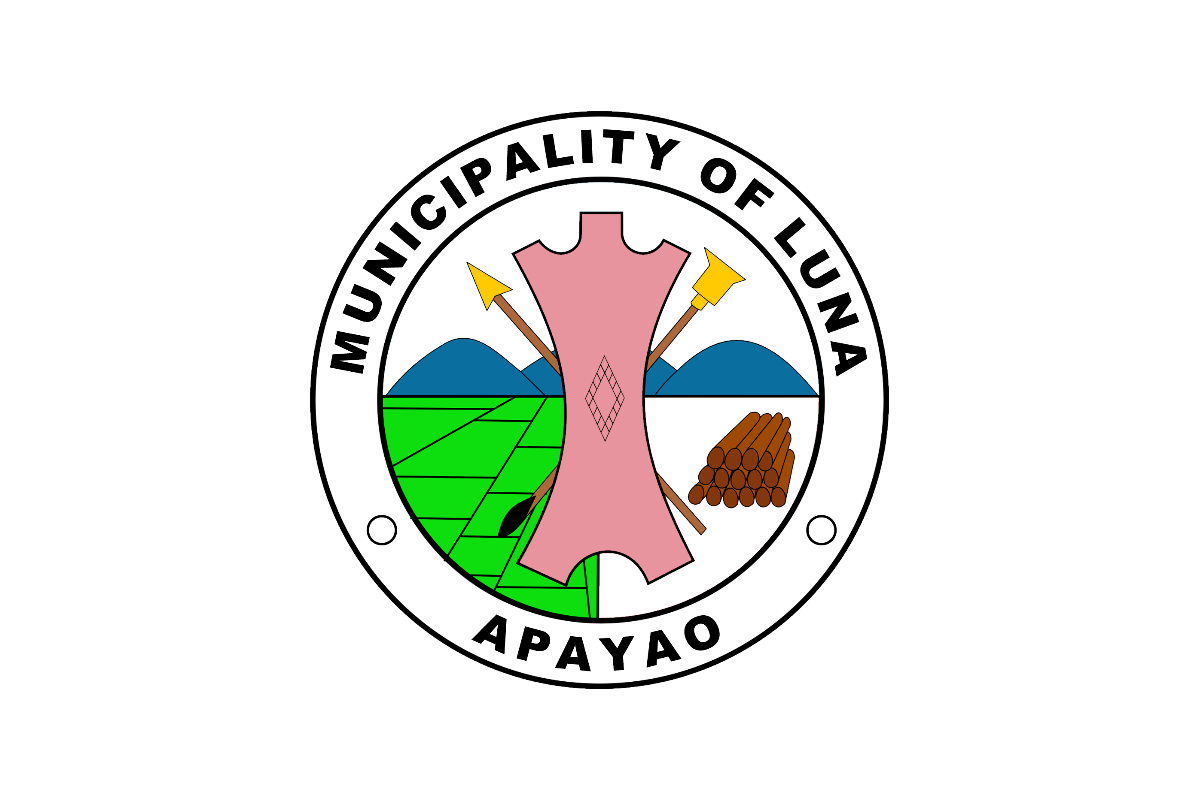
- Flag Seal

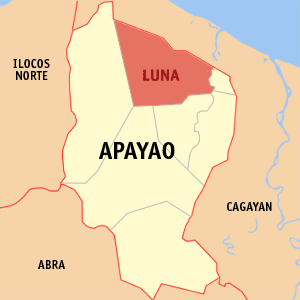
- Map of Apayao with Luna highlighted
- Interactive map of Luna
- Location within the Philippines
- Coordinates: 18°19′52″N 121°22′21″E
- Country: Philippines
- Region: Cordillera Administrative Region
- Province: Apayao
- District: Lone district
- Established: October 1, 1929
- Barangays: 22 (see Barangays)

Government
  - Type: Sangguniang Bayan
  - Mayor: Januario S. Garde (Lakas)
  - Vice Mayor: Cecile A. Caluya (Lakas)
  - Representative: Eleanor Bulut-Begtang
  - Municipal Council: Members: Marie Flor S. Verzola; Ellarne B. Turingan; Harison B. Agustin; Relyn P. Ballesteros; Benny N. Alipay; Samuel R. Calilan; Eduardo O. Galleon; Edmon S. Cabrera
  - Electorate: 12,891 voters (2025)

Area
  - Total: 606.04 km^{2} (233.99 sq mi)
- Elevation: 41 m (135 ft)
- Highest elevation: 349 m (1,145 ft)
- Lowest elevation: 3 m (9.8 ft)

Population (2024 census)
  - Total: 21,630
  - Density: 35.69/km^{2} (92.44/sq mi)
  - Households: 5,047

Economy
  - Income class: 1st municipal income class
  - Poverty incidence: 6.07% (2023)
  - Revenue: ₱ 268.4 million (2024)
  - Assets: ₱ 575.2 million (2024)
  - Expenditure: ₱ 202.4 million (2024)
  - Liabilities: ₱ 32.52 million (2024)

Service provider
  - Electricity: Kalinga - Apayao Electric Cooperative (KAELCO)
- Time zone: UTC+8 (PST)
- ZIP code: 3813
- PSGC: 1408105000
- IDD : area code: +63 (0)74
- Native languages: Isnag; Ilocano; Tagalog

Luna, officially the Municipality of Luna, (Note: Ilocano: Ili ti Luna; Tagalog: Bayan ng Luna) is a municipality and seat of government of the province of Apayao, Philippines. According to the 2024 census, it has a population of 21,630 people.

The municipality serves as the site of the provincial capitol and other related offices at the New Apayao Government Center. Despite this, Kabugao remains the official capital.

== Etymology ==
Its former name was Macatel then it was changed to Luna by the town's founding father, the Ilocano explorer Antonino Barroga from Dingras, Ilocos Norte.

== Geography ==
According to the Philippine Statistics Authority, the municipality has a land area of 606.04 square kilometres (233.99 sq mi) constituting 13.73% of the 4,413.35-square-kilometre- (1,704.00 sq mi) total area of Apayao.

Luna is situated 93.18 kilometres (57.90 mi) from the provincial capital Kabugao, and 615.00 kilometres (382.14 mi) from the country's capital city of Manila.

=== Barangays ===
Luna is politically subdivided into 22 barangays. Each barangay consists of puroks and some have sitios.

PSGC	Barangay	Population			±% p.a.	
		2024		2010		
148105001	Bacsay	4.2%	910	850	▴	0.47%
148105016	Cagandungan	3.6%	785	618	▴	1.66%
148105017	Calabigan	2.2%	478	532	▾	−0.73%
148105018	Cangisitan	3.6%	784	683	▴	0.95%
148105002	Capagaypayan	2.8%	615	468	▴	1.90%
148105003	Dagupan	11.7%	2,539	2,038	▴	1.53%
148105004	Lappa	4.0%	872	667	▴	1.86%
148105019	Luyon	2.1%	444	350	▴	1.65%
148105006	Marag	3.5%	766	557	▴	2.22%
148105007	Poblacion	5.7%	1,235	1,107	▴	0.76%
148105008	Quirino	6.7%	1,458	1,228	▴	1.19%
148105009	Salvacion	1.8%	389	395	▾	−0.11%
148105010	San Francisco	4.4%	951	840	▴	0.86%
148105020	San Gregorio	2.8%	600	529	▴	0.87%
148105011	San Isidro Norte	3.9%	833	750	▴	0.73%
148105021	San Isidro Sur	7.9%	1,708	1,326	▴	1.76%
148105012	San Sebastian	2.0%	435	355	▴	1.41%
148105013	Santa Lina	5.3%	1,153	1,026	▴	0.81%
148105022	Shalom	3.4%	725	666	▴	0.59%
148105014	Tumog	7.4%	1,611	1,285	▴	1.57%
148105023	Turod	5.5%	1,190	1,064	▴	0.77%
148105015	Zumigui	3.8%	816	695	▴	1.11%
	Total		21,630	21,297	▴	0.11%

=== Climate ===
Climate data for Luna, Apayao
Month	Jan	Feb	Mar	Apr	May	Jun	Jul	Aug	Sep	Oct	Nov	Dec	Year
Mean daily maximum °C (°F)	24 (75)	26 (79)	28 (82)	31 (88)	31 (88)	31 (88)	30 (86)	30 (86)	29 (84)	28 (82)	26 (79)	24 (75)	28 (83)
Mean daily minimum °C (°F)	19 (66)	19 (66)	20 (68)	22 (72)	24 (75)	24 (75)	24 (75)	24 (75)	23 (73)	23 (73)	22 (72)	21 (70)	22 (72)
Average precipitation mm (inches)	120 (4.7)	77 (3.0)	62 (2.4)	40 (1.6)	118 (4.6)	138 (5.4)	162 (6.4)	173 (6.8)	143 (5.6)	198 (7.8)	185 (7.3)	248 (9.8)	1,664 (65.4)
Average rainy days	16.9	12.2	11.5	10.6	18.7	20.1	21.2	23.3	20.8	16.9	16.5	20.0	208.7
Source: Meteoblue

== Demographics ==
Population census of Luna
Year	Pop.	±% p.a.
1918	2,202	—
1939	6,353	+5.17%
1948	9,150	+4.14%
1960	8,430	−0.68%
1970	9,980	+1.70%
1975	11,301	+2.52%
1980	13,668	+3.88%
1990	10,550	−2.56%
1995	12,126	+2.64%
2000	14,154	+3.37%
2007	16,431	+2.08%
2010	18,029	+3.44%
2015	19,063	+1.07%
2020	21,297	+2.36%
2024	21,630	+0.37%
Source: Philippine Statistics Authority

In the 2024 census, Luna had a population of 21,630 people. The population density was 36 inhabitants per square kilometre (93/sq mi).

== Economy ==
Poverty incidence of Luna (%)

Source: Philippine Statistics Authority

The economy of Luna relies on agriculture, wholesale and retail trade, and local agro-industrial ventures. The agriculture of Luna focuses on rice and corn production. The irrigation rehabilitation projects are ongoing in the municipality. Local enterprises such as coconut product ventures manufacture coconut products to boost Luna's economy. Wholesale and retail trade is the largest share of economic activity in Luna.

== Government ==
=== Local government ===
Luna, belonging to the lone congressional district of the province of Apayao, is governed by a mayor designated as its local chief executive and by a municipal council as its legislative body in accordance with the Local Government Code. The mayor, vice mayor, and the councilors are elected directly by the people through an election which is being held every three years.

=== Elected officials ===
Members of the Municipal Council (2025-2028)
Position	Name
Congressman	Eleanor C. Bulut-Begtang
Mayor	Januario S. Garde
Vice-Mayor	Cecile A. Caluya
Councilors	Edmon S. Cabrera
Councilors	Ellarne B. Turingan
Councilors	Samuel R. Calilan
Councilors	Harison B. Agustin
Councilors	Relyn P. Ballesteros
Councilors	Benny N. Alipay
Councilors	Marie Flor S. Verzola
Councilors	Eduardo O. Galleon

== Education ==
The Luna Schools District Office governs all educational institutions within the municipality. It oversees the management and operations of all private and public, from primary to secondary schools.

=== Primary and elementary schools ===
- Bacsay Elementary School
- Bayugao Elementary School
- Cagandungan East Elementary School
- Cagandungan West Elementary School
- Calabigan Elementary School
- Calayucay Elementary School
- Capagaypayan Primary School
- Catammoyoan Elementary School
- Dagupan Elementary School
- Luna Central School
- Luyon Elementary School
- Marag Elementary School
- Palungkada Elementary School
- Quirino Elementary School
- Salvacion Elementary School
- San Francisco Elementary School
- San Gregorio Elementary School
- San Isidro Elementary School
- San Isidro Norte Elementary School
- San Jose Elementary School
- Shalom Primary School
- Sta. Lina Elementary School
- Tumog Elementary School

=== Secondary schools ===
- Apayao Science High School
- BAC-DA National High School
- KJB Solid Rock Baptist Academy
- Luna National High School
- Marag Valley Agricultural and Trade High School
- Tumog National Agricultural and trade High School
- San Francisco National Agricultural and Trade High School

== Infrastructure ==
On May 10, 2025, A 99 million Pesos slope protection project was completed and at least 3,723 people benefit from this project, it was funded under the 2024 General Appropriations Act
