= Legislative districts of Apayao =

Filipino legislative districts in the province of Apayao

The legislative districts of Apayao are the representations of the province of Apayao in the various national legislatures of the Philippines. The province is currently represented in the lower house of the Congress of the Philippines through its lone congressional district.

== History ==
Prior to gaining separate representation, areas now under the jurisdiction of Apayao were represented under the former Mountain Province (1917–1969) and Kalinga-Apayao (1969–1998). Apayao became a separate province following the passage and subsequent ratification of Republic Act No. 7878 on May 8, 1995. In accordance with Section 9 of R.A. 7878 the new province began electing its own representative in the 1998 elections.

Beginning in 2019, the districts used in appropriation of members is coextensive with the legislative districts of Apayao. Prior to 2019 when the province was just one congressional district, the Commission on Elections divided the province into two provincial board districts.

== Senatorial representation ==
Between 1916 and 1935, the territory of what is now Apayao (then part of Mountain Province) was represented in the Senate of the Philippines through the 12th senatorial district of the Philippine Islands. However, in 1935, all senatorial districts were abolished when a unicameral National Assembly was installed under a new constitution following the passage of the Tydings–McDuffie Act, which established the Commonwealth of the Philippines. Since the 1941 elections, when the Senate was restored after a constitutional plebiscite, all twenty-four members of the upper house have been elected countrywide at-large.

== Congressional representation ==
Apayao has been represented in the lower house of various Philippine national legislatures since 1995, through its at-large congressional district.

Legislative Districts and Congressional Representatives of Apayao
District	Current Representative	Party	Population (2020)	Area
Lone	Eleanor Bulut-Begtang (since 2022); Calanasan	NPC	124,366	4,413.35 km^{2}

== Provincial board districts ==
The municipalities of Apayao are represented in the Apayao Provincial Board, the Sangguniang Panlalawigan (provincial legislature) of the province, through Apayao's first and second provincial board districts.

== See also ==
- Legislative districts of Mountain Province
- Legislative districts of Kalinga-Apayao
  - Legislative districts of Kalinga
