= Kabugao =

Capital of Apayao, Philippines

- Municipality
- Municipality of Kabugao
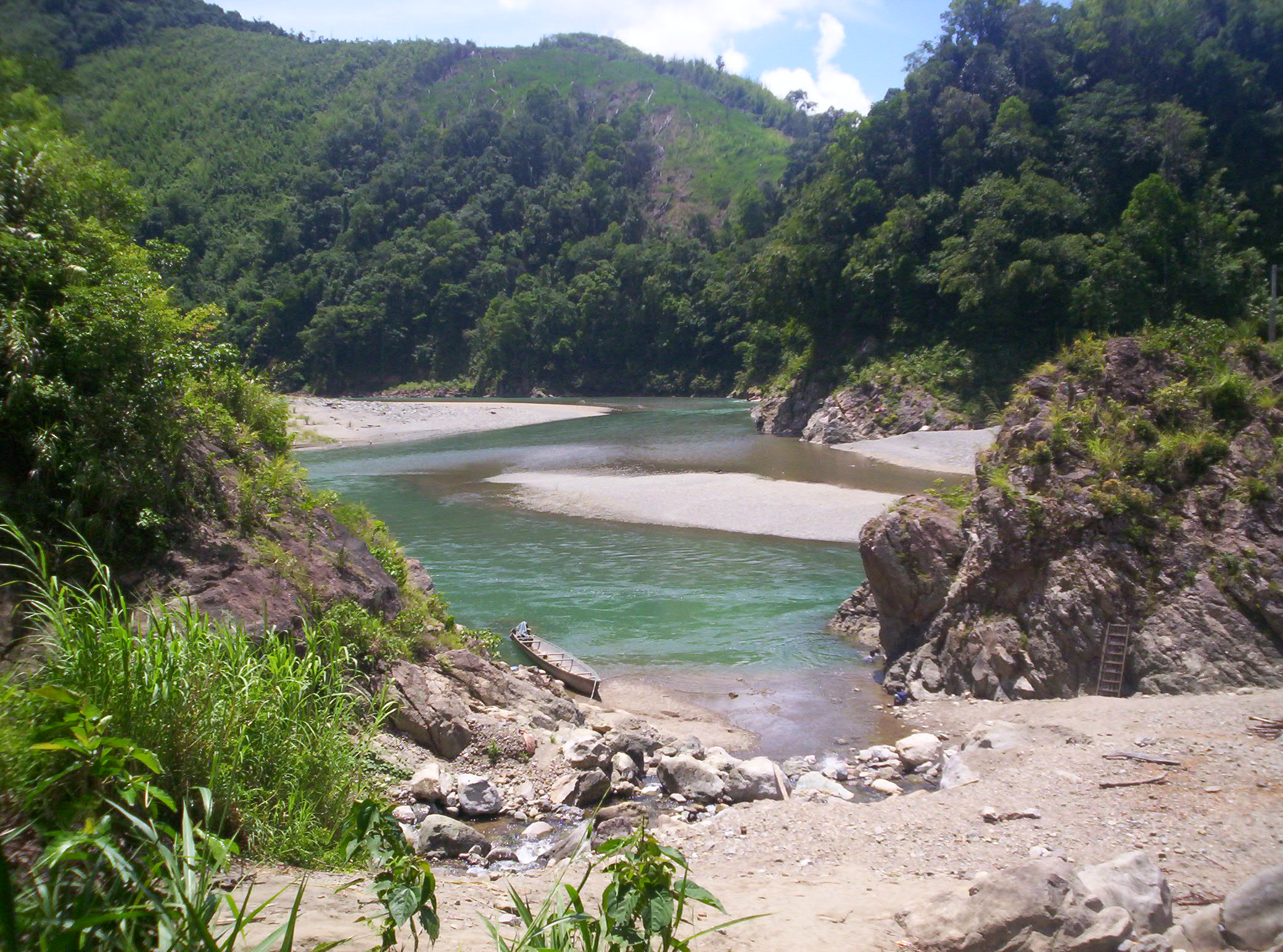
- Landscape in Barangay Dibagat

- Flag

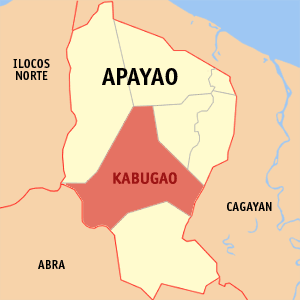
- Map of Apayao with Kabugao highlighted
- Interactive map of Kabugao
- Location within the Philippines
- Coordinates: 18°01′26″N 121°11′00″E
- Country: Philippines
- Region: Cordillera Administrative Region
- Province: Apayao
- District: Lone district
- Founded: 1950
- Barangays: 21 (see Barangays)

Government
  - Type: Sangguniang Bayan
  - Mayor: Bensmar B. Ligwang (NPC)
  - Vice Mayor: Frederick C. Amid (IND)
  - Representative: Eleanor Bulut-Begtang
  - Municipal Council: Members: Benjie Ace L. Talimbatog; Arne Paul F. Ligwang; Carl Lewis M. Amid; Pedro B. Dandan; Venancio D. Culdong; Jayson T. Enciso; Javan Ross B. Mamba; Van Aldwin U. Culdong
  - Electorate: 12,081 voters (2025)

Area
  - Total: 935.12 km^{2} (361.05 sq mi)
- Elevation: 262 m (860 ft)
- Highest elevation: 689 m (2,260 ft)
- Lowest elevation: 78 m (256 ft)

Population (2024 census)
  - Total: 16,425
  - Density: 17.565/km^{2} (45.492/sq mi)
  - Households: 3,506

Economy
  - Income class: 1st municipal income class
  - Poverty incidence: 10.63% (2023)
  - Revenue: ₱ 323.2 million (2024)
  - Assets: ₱ 927.7 million (2024)
  - Expenditure: ₱ 255.5 million (2024)
  - Liabilities: ₱ 64.88 million (2024)

Service provider
  - Electricity: Kalinga - Apayao Electric Cooperative (KAELCO)
- Time zone: UTC+8 (PST)
- ZIP code: 3809
- PSGC: 1408104000
- IDD : area code: +63 (0)74
- Native languages: Isnag; Itawis; Ilocano; Tagalog

Kabugao, officially the Municipality of Kabugao, (Note: Ilocano: Ili ti Kabugao; Itawis: Babalay yo Kabugao; Tagalog: Bayan ng Kabugao)) is a municipality and capital (Note: While Kabugao is officially the capital (de jure), the province carries out many of its operations in a new government center established in Luna.) of the province of Apayao, Philippines. According to the 2024 census, it has a population of 16,425 people.

== History ==
On July 12, 1915, Governor General Francis Burton Harrison issued Executive Order No. 45, transferring the capital of then sub-province of Apayao from Tauit to Kabugao, to be effective on August 1.

Kabugao was occupied for a year by the Japanese during the Second World War. It was captured in December 1942, after the USAFIP NL retreated from the town.

== Geography ==
According to the Philippine Statistics Authority, the municipality has a land area of 935.12 square kilometres (361.05 sq mi) constituting 21.19% of the 4,413.35-square-kilometre- (1,704.00 sq mi) total area of Apayao.

Kabugao is situated 563.61 kilometres (350.21 mi) from the country's capital city of Manila.

=== Barangays ===
Kabugao is politically subdivided into 21 barangays. Each barangay consists of puroks and some have sitios.

PSGC	Barangay	Population			±% p.a.	
		2024		2010		
148104001	Badduat	6.5%	1,065	1,000	▴	0.43%
148104002	Baliwanan	2.8%	467	478	▾	−0.16%
148104004	Bulu	2.4%	401	298	▴	2.07%
148104007	Cabetayan	3.6%	597	556	▴	0.49%
148104005	Dagara	2.7%	437	484	▾	−0.70%
148104006	Dibagat	3.8%	616	797	▾	−1.76%
148104008	Karagawan	4.1%	676	676	Steady	0.00%
148104009	Kumao	3.5%	575	557	▴	0.22%
148104010	Laco	2.6%	427	410	▴	0.28%
148104011	Lenneng (Liyyeng)	15.7%	2,572	2,396	▴	0.49%
148104012	Lucab	3.4%	565	660	▾	−1.06%
148104013	Luttuacan	6.2%	1,014	786	▴	1.77%
148104014	Madatag	5.0%	818	766	▴	0.45%
148104015	Madduang	3.8%	626	423	▴	2.74%
148104016	Magabta	1.2%	191	215	▾	−0.81%
148104017	Maragat	1.7%	276	503	▾	−4.05%
148104018	Musimut	5.1%	842	822	▴	0.17%
148104019	Nagbabalayan	2.9%	482	511	▾	−0.40%
148104020	Poblacion	19.2%	3,154	3,217	▾	−0.14%
148104021	Tuyangan	1.4%	223	334	▾	−2.74%
148104022	Waga	1.2%	191	281	▾	−2.62%
	Total		16,425	16,215	▴	0.09%

==== Dibagat ====
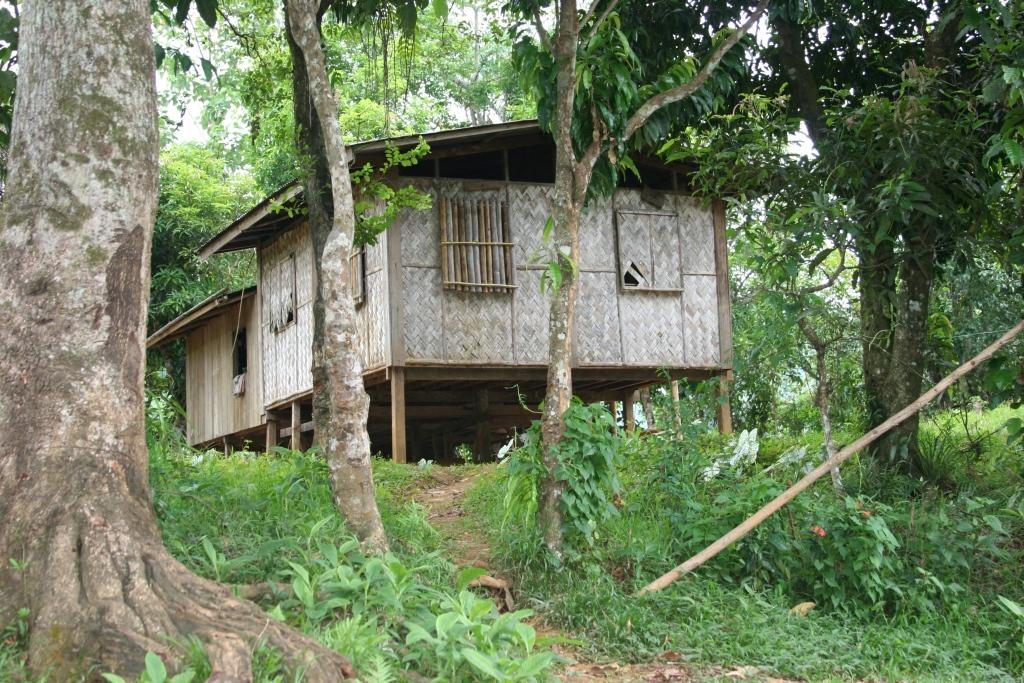
A typical home in Barangay Dibagat

Barangay Dibagat is inhabited by the Isnag and the Ilocano. There is a small grass airstrip built by SIL in 1985. Dibagat was only accessible before by canoe or by specialized aircraft, until the construction of Ilocos Norte–Apayao Road.

=== Climate ===
Climate data for Kabugao, Apayao
Month	Jan	Feb	Mar	Apr	May	Jun	Jul	Aug	Sep	Oct	Nov	Dec	Year
Mean daily maximum °C (°F)	25 (77)	26 (79)	29 (84)	31 (88)	31 (88)	31 (88)	30 (86)	30 (86)	29 (84)	28 (82)	27 (81)	25 (77)	29 (83)
Mean daily minimum °C (°F)	20 (68)	20 (68)	21 (70)	23 (73)	24 (75)	24 (75)	24 (75)	24 (75)	24 (75)	23 (73)	22 (72)	21 (70)	23 (72)
Average precipitation mm (inches)	133 (5.2)	87 (3.4)	68 (2.7)	44 (1.7)	127 (5.0)	134 (5.3)	160 (6.3)	162 (6.4)	134 (5.3)	192 (7.6)	194 (7.6)	260 (10.2)	1,695 (66.7)
Average rainy days	18.1	13.3	13.3	11.8	19.7	20.9	22.8	22.8	20.3	16.6	18.4	21.7	219.7
Source: Meteoblue

== Demographics ==
Population census of Kabugao
Year	Pop.	±% p.a.
1918	3,448	—
1939	4,646	+1.43%
1948	4,545	−0.24%
1960	5,961	+2.29%
1970	7,358	+2.13%
1975	8,720	+3.46%
1980	9,600	+1.94%
1990	11,198	+1.55%
1995	12,710	+2.40%
2000	13,985	+2.07%
2007	14,529	+0.53%
2010	16,170	+3.97%
2015	15,537	−0.76%
2020	16,215	+0.90%
2024	16,425	+0.31%
Source: Philippine Statistics Authority

In the 2024 census, Kabugao had a population of 16,425 people. The population density was 18 inhabitants per square kilometre (47/sq mi).

=== Language ===
Ilocano and Isnag are the main languages spoken in Kabugao.

== Economy ==
Poverty incidence of Kabugao (%)

Source: Philippine Statistics Authority

The economy of Kabugao relies on agriculture, forestry, and local trade. The main sources of agriculture in Kabugao are rice palay, corn, coffee, root crops, and vegetables. Farmers are raising livestock like cattle, carabaos, pigs, and native chickens.

Kabugao uses trees, rattan, and bamboo to create local crafts. Kabugao's industrial work include blacksmithing, furniture-making, and weaving.

The Department of Public Works and Highways completed a road project in Kabugao to enhance connectivity to neighbor provinces and towns.

== Government ==
=== Local government ===
Kabugao, belonging to the lone congressional district of the province of Apayao, is governed by a mayor designated as its local chief executive and by a municipal council as its legislative body in accordance with the Local Government Code. The mayor, vice mayor, and the councilors are elected directly by the people through an election which is being held every three years.

=== Elected officials ===
Members of the Municipal Council (2025-2028)
Position	Name
Governor	Elias C. Bulut Jr.
Mayor	Bensmar B. Ligwang
Vice-Mayor	Frederick C. Amid
Councilors	Arne Paul F. Ligwang
Councilors	Benjie Ace L. Talimbatog
Councilors	Carl Lewis M. Amid
Councilors	Jayson T. Enciso
Councilors	Javan Ross B. Mamba
Councilors	Venancio D. Culdong
Councilors	Pedro B. Dandan
Councilors	Van Aldwin U. Culdong
LNB President	Robles Ammay
IPMR	James S. Amid
SK Federation President	Jazreal Jamila C. Enciso

== Education ==
The Kabugao Schools District Office governs all educational institutions within the municipality. It oversees the management and operations of all private and public, from primary to secondary schools.

In 1948, Rev. Louis Saunders of an evangelical Protestant sect, The Disciples of Christ, opened the Apayao Christian Academy, Kabugao's first secondary school. In 1950, amidst rivalry among churches, the Catholics started its own secondary school, Our Blessed Lady of Lourdes.

=== Primary and elementary schools ===
- Apadi Elementary School
- Badduat Elementary School
- Baliwanan Elementary School
- Banan Elementary School
- Binuan Elementary School
- Cabetayan Elementary School
- Culilimtao Elementary School
- Dangla Elementary School
- Dibagat Elementary School
- Guimitan Primary School
- Iyapan Primary School
- Kabugao Central School
- Kadikitan Elementary School
- Kagawaddan Primary School
- Karagawan Elementary School
- Kumao Elementary School
- Laco Elementary School
- Lenneng Elementary School
- Lucab Elementary School
- Madatag Elementary School
- Madduang Elementary School
- Magabta Elementary School
- Malabanig Elementary School
- Mallag Primary School
- Maragat Elementary School
- Musimut Elementary School
- Nagbabalayan ES
- Paco Valley Elementary School
- Tabba Elementary School
- Taracay Primary School
- Tuyangan Elementary School
- Waga Elementary School

=== Secondary schools ===
- Dagara Integrated School
- Kabugao Agro-Industrial High School
- Kabugao National High School
- Kalliat Integrated School
- Mayor Bartolome Serut National Agricultural and Trade High School (Main)
- Musimut National High School
- Our Lady of Lourdes High School
