= List of musical instruments by Hornbostel–Sachs number: 312.11 =

This is a list of instruments by Hornbostel-Sachs number, covering those instruments that are classified under 312.11 under that system. These instruments are idiochord tube zithers.

3: Instruments in which sound is produced by one or more vibrating strings (chordophones, string instruments).

31: Instruments which consist solely of a string bearer or a string bearer with a resonator that is not integral to the instrument

312: Instrument has a string bearer made of a vaulted surface (tube zithers)

312.1: Instrument has a string carrier made from a complete tube (whole-tube zithers)

312.11: Instrument is an idiochord

These instruments may be classified with a suffix, based on how the strings are caused to vibrate.

- 4: Hammers or beaters
- 5: Bare hands and fingers
- 6: Plectrum
- 7: Bowing
  - 71: Using a bow
  - 72: Using a wheel
  - 73: Using a ribbon
- 8: Keyboard
- 9: Using a mechanical drive

== List ==
Instrument	Tradition	Hornbostel–Sachs classification	Description
Benta	Jamaica	312.11	Tube zither
Guntang	Indonesia	312.11	Tube zither
Karaniing	Malaysia	312.11	Tube zither
Keteng-Keteng	Indonesia	312.11	Tube zither
Kolitong	Philippines	312.11	Tube zither
Kong ring	Cambodia	312.11	Tube zither
Kulibit	Philippines	312.11	Tube zither
Mengmung	Indonesia	312.11	Tube zither
Tanggetang	Indonesia	312.11	Tube zither
Takumbo	Indonesia	312.11	Tube zither
Tol alao	Vietnam	312.11	Tubular zither
valiha	Madagascar	312.11	Tubular zither
Yalamber Baja; Yalamber	Nepal	312.11	Tube zither
