= Sasando =

Indonesian traditional musical instrument

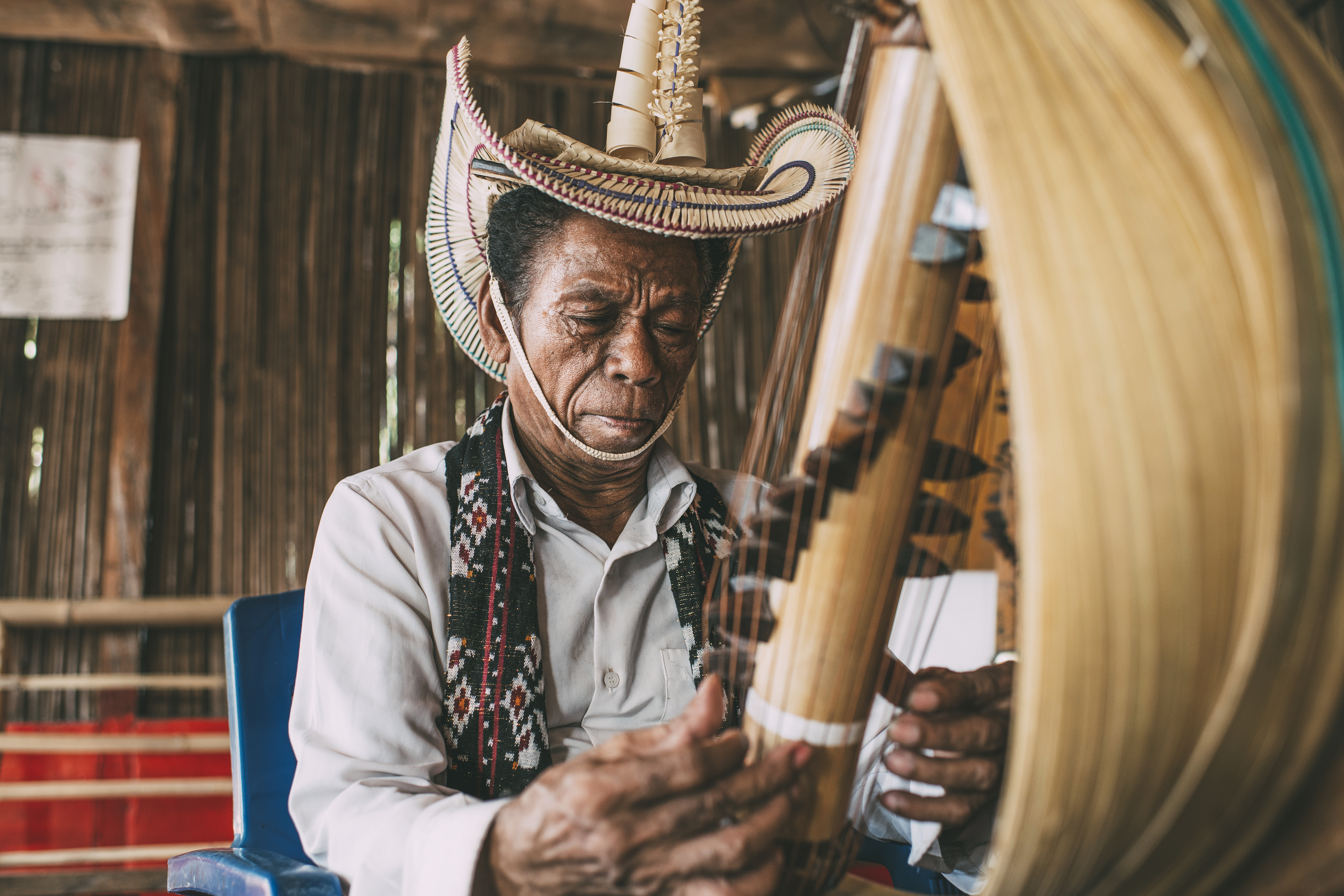
- Man playing Sasando
- Classification: String Instruments
- Inventor: Rotenese people
- Developed: Indonesia

Related instruments
- Indonesian Traditional Instruments

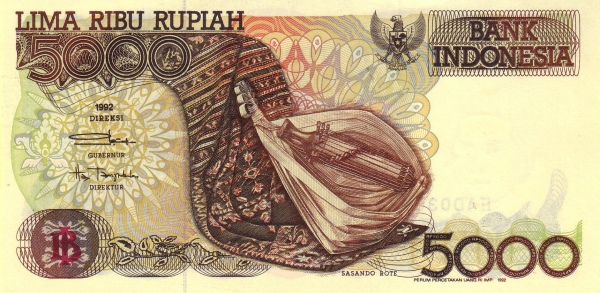
Sasando featured in 5,000-rupiah banknote.

The sasando, also called sasandu from Sandu or Sanu, is a tube zither, a harp-like traditional music string instrument native to Rote Island of East Nusa Tenggara, Indonesia.

The name sasando is derived from the Rote dialect word ”sasandu”, which means "vibrating" or "sounded instrument". It is believed that the sasando had already been known to the Rote people since the 7th century.

A local person from Kupang playing sasando connected to an external sound system

The main part of the sasando is a bamboo tube that serves as the frame of the instrument. Surrounding the tube are several wooden pieces serving as wedges where the strings are stretched from the top to the bottom. The function of the wedges is to hold the strings higher than the tube surface and also to produce various lengths of strings so it can create different musical notes. The stringed bamboo tube is surrounded by a bag-like fan of dried lontar or palmyra leaves (Borassus flabellifer), which functions as the resonator of the instrument. The sasando is played with both hands reaching into the stings of the bamboo tube through opening on the front. The player's fingers then pluck the strings in a fashion similar to playing a harp or kacapi.

The sasando can have 28 (sasando engkel) or 56 strings (double strings).

== Legend ==
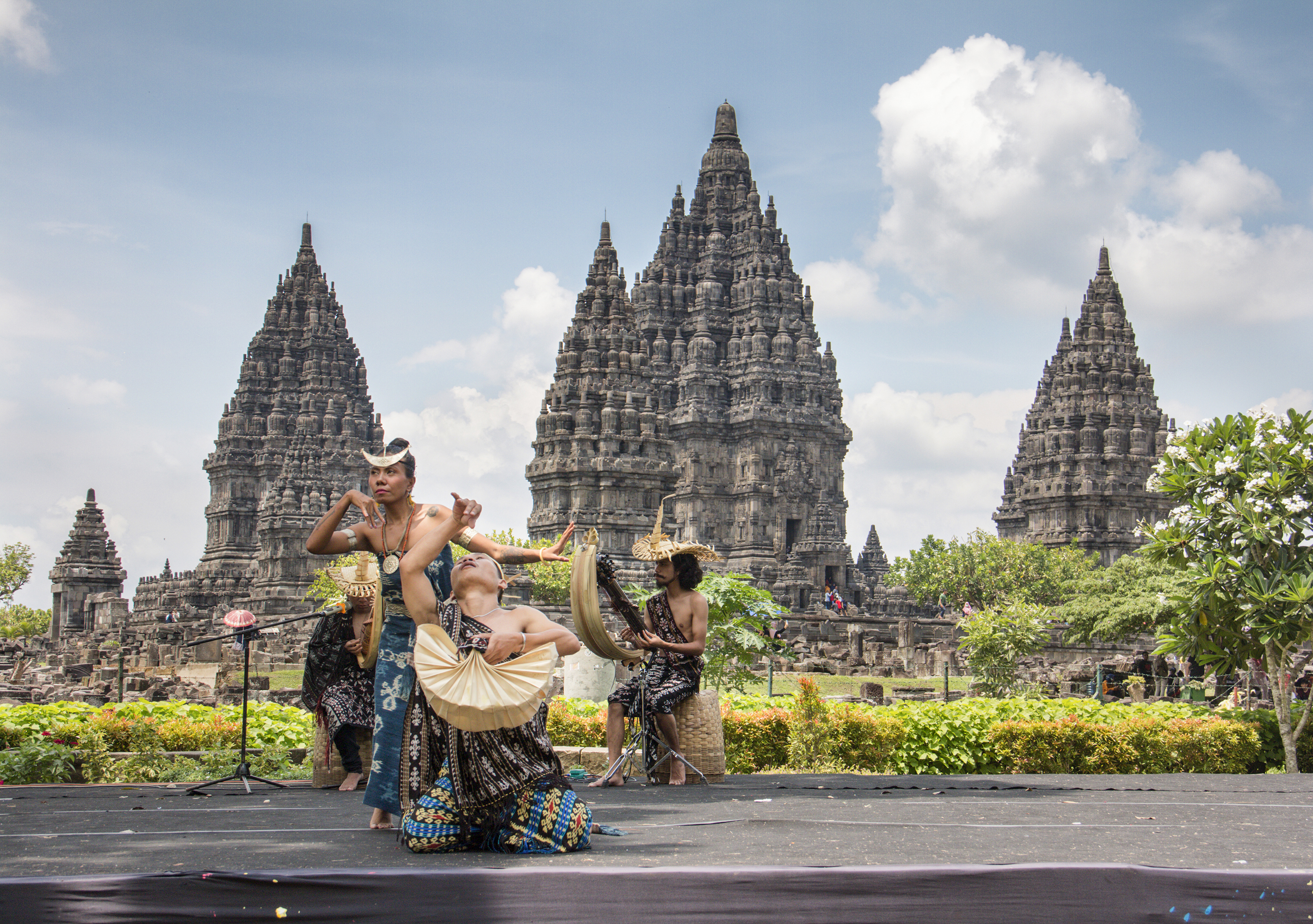
Sasando performance near Prambanan temple

According to local tradition, the origin of the sasando is linked to the folktale of the Rote people about Sangguana. The story goes that there once was a boy named Sangguana who lived on Rote Island. One day, as he tended to savannah, he felt tired and fell asleep under a palmyra tree. Sangguana dreamt that he played beautiful music with a unique instrument whose sound and melody were so enchanting. When he woke up, surprisingly, Sangguana could still remember the tones he played in the dream. Wanting to hear it one more time, he tried to fall asleep again. Again, he dreamt of the same song and the same instrument. Sangguana was enjoying his dream, but eventually, he had to wake up. Not wanting to lose the beautiful sounds from his dream, Sangguana tried to recreate the sounds and quickly created a musical instrument from palmyra leaves with the strings in the middle, based on his memory from the dream, which became the basis of the sasando.

== See also ==
The following are tube zithers from other countries. They are similar in being made from bamboo, originally having strings cut from the bamboo itself. Some, like the sasando, have been changed in the last century to use new materials, such as wires attached to pegs. Unlike the sasando, none have the leaves to direct the sound.

- Karaniing
- Kolitong
- Kong ring
- krem
- Kulibit
- Valiha
