= Kong ring =

Musical instrument

Kong ring គង់រេង
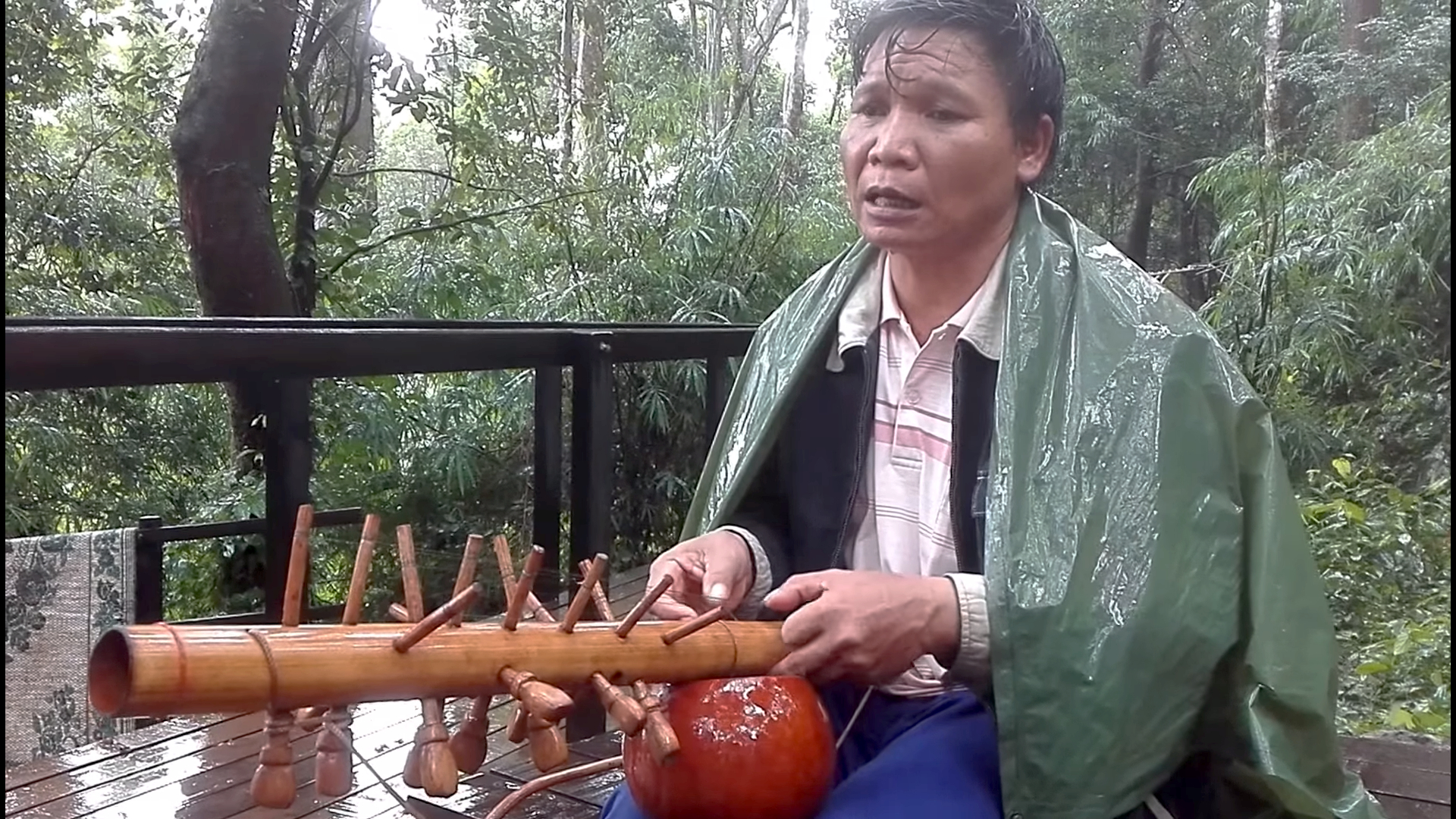
- Musician sings and plucks the strings of his kong ring គង់រេង (tube zither), in Mondulkiri Province, Cambodia.

String instrument
- Classification: String instrument Plucked string instrument
- Hornbostel–Sachs classification: 312.11; 312.122 (*Idiochord tube zithers; Heterochord tube zithers with extra resonator.)

Related instruments
- Đàn goong, Vietnam

The kong ring or gung treng (Khmer: គង់រេង) is a Cambodian tube zither, in which a tube of bamboo is used as a resonator for stings that run along the outside of the tube, lengthwise. It has the same musical purpose as the "bossed gongs" (circular gongs that have a rounded bump in the center, like a shield boss) and may substitute for them and accompany singing. Although it is a traditional instrument with a long history, it has been improved on in modern times. The kong ring is represented by similar instruments in other countries of South Asia and the Pacific.

== Styles ==
There are two different syles; the traditional uses bamboo to make the sounding strings, and a more modern style uses new materials.

=== Traditional ===
Originally, the strings played were created by cutting the outer layer or crust of the bamboo, to separate 7 strings (leaving them attached to the tube at each end), and placing a bridge pressed underneath at each end. Resonance holes were cut under the strings, long and narrow.

=== New materials ===
Instead of creating strings from bamboo, metal strings can also be used, attached with pegs. A resonator gourd may also be added; this may be less a resonator than a way to stabilize the instrument as it is held against the chest.

== Asian and Pacific variants ==
Variants of the Kong ring can be found Vietnam, Thailand, Malaysia, Madagascar and the Philippines.

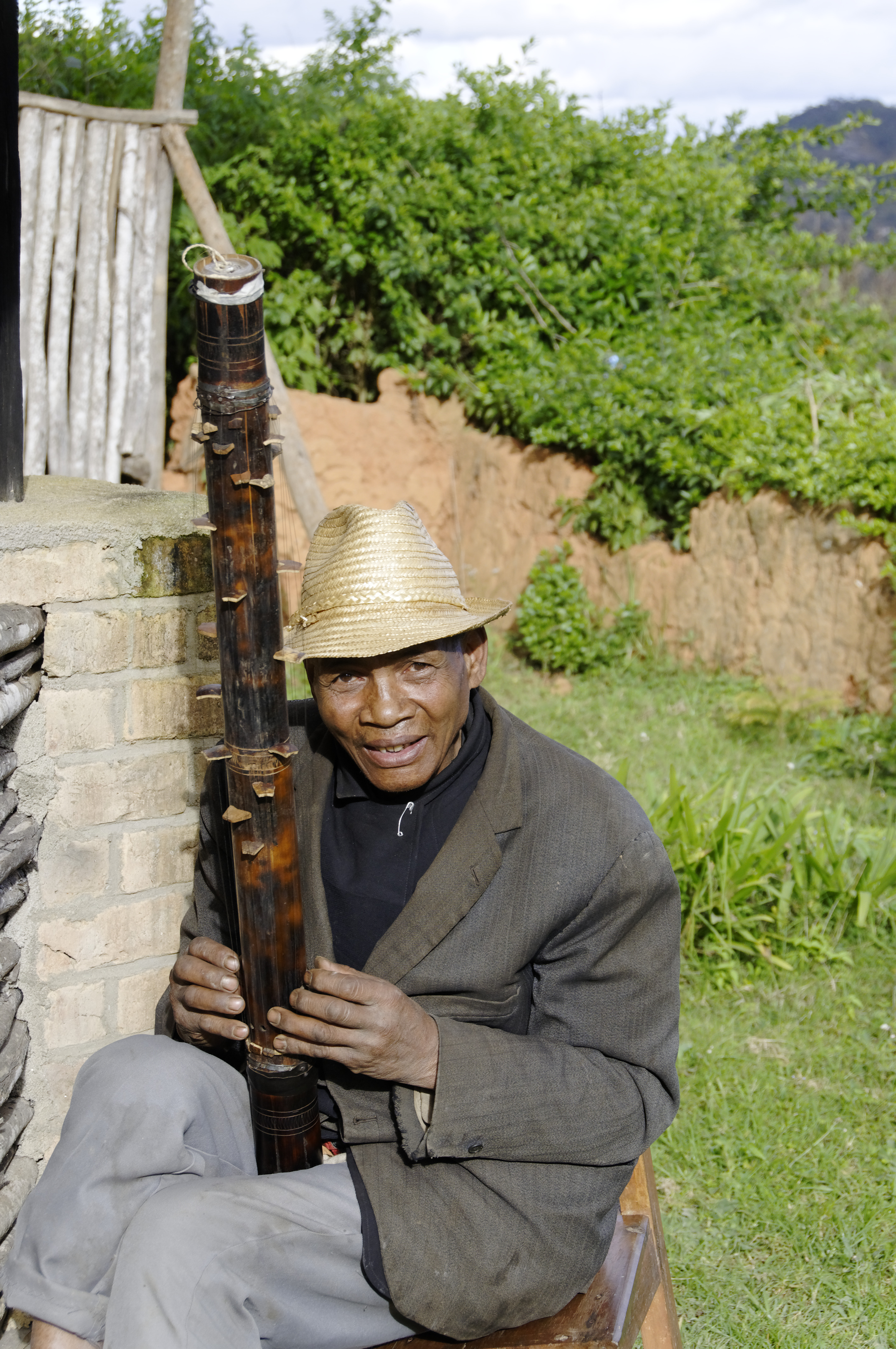
Madagascar valiha player with his instrument. This instrument has features found on both the old and new kong ring. Like the new, it uses metal strings. Like the old it uses bridges to tighten the strings, rather than pegs. Like the dinh goong it has the ends of the strings secured inside the bamboo tube.

In Vietnam, a variant exists today, the Đàn goong, that looks like the modern Cambodian instrument, with as many as 17 metal strings and pegs. With instruments made with steel strings the Vietnamese instruments have one end secured inside the bamboo tube, the other wrapped around a peg on the opposite end, to add string tension and to lift the stings off the bamboo tube.

In Thailand, it can be found among the Karenni Kayan people, where it may have as many as 8 bamboo strings cut from the resonator. Among the Kareni, it is used for love songs, providing a "delicate rhythmic accompanyment."

Variants in Malaysia, Madagascar and the Philippines resemble the older style of kong ring, with strings cut from the bamboo tube and bridges placed under the strips of bamboo turned into strings. Placement of the bridges, and the ability to move them, allows for the Valiha to be tuned to different scales.

In Madagascar the instrument is called valiha. In East Timor it is the "lakado." In Malaysia it is called karaniing and krem. It is used widely in the Philippines and goes by multiple names including kolitong and kulibit.

Similar tube zithers are believed by some to be the origin of the Chinese Guzheng
