= Celempungan =

Indonesian music genre

Celempungan is a Sundanese musical genre that includes several musical instruments such as kacapi, kendang, goong/gong, and suling or rebab (optional), and Juru Kawih (singer). Kendang, the drum, controls the tempo of the ensemble and reinforces the meter.

Celempungan is named for the celempung, a bamboo tube zither from West Java. Celempungan ensembles had their golden era from 1935 to 1945. In modern celempungan ensembles, the celempung may be replaced by the siter, kacapi, and kendang. Troupes' musical repertoires include gamelan salendro kliningan. Dutch ethnomusicologist Jaap Kunst described celempungan in his 1973 book Music in Java:

"The chelempung-orchestra (ill. 131) is fortunate in being widely-spread. The name is derived from the idiochord bamboo instruments, which are found in it in two different functions, i.e., as kendang and as ketuk. The other instruments in this combination—another essential element of which seems to be a female voice—are: rebab, suling, goong awi, and—not always, however—a kachapi."

== See also ==
- Karinding
