= Raft zither =

Group of single-cord tube zithers

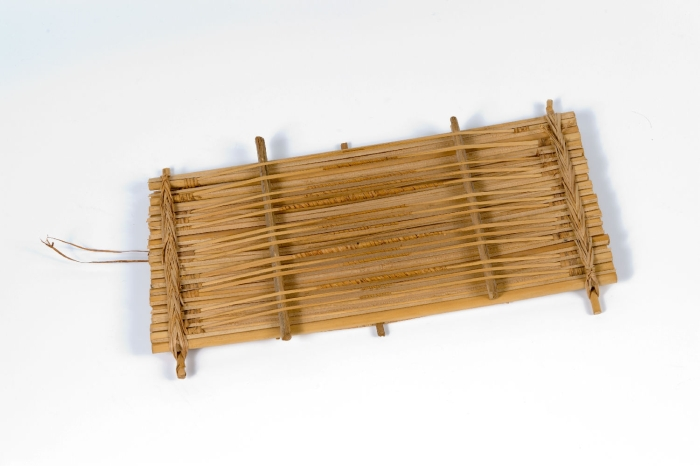
Raft zither from Nigeria, part of the cultures of Fellani, Foulah, Ful, Fulani, Fulbe, Peul, and Toucouleur peoples

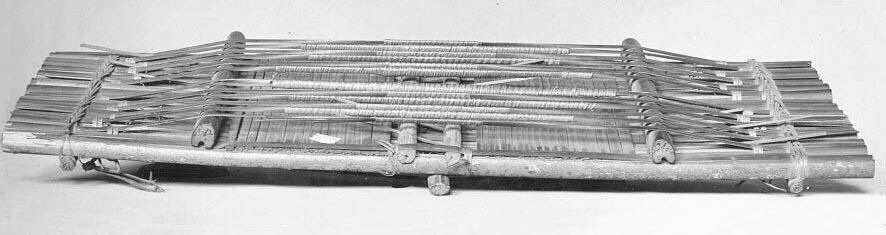
Raft zither, Benin, 19th century

A raft zither is a group of single-cord tube zithers, connected together to form a "raft". Tube zithers use a tube as a platform to hold a string (either tied onto the tube or cut out of the tube itself), raised with bridges.

The flat surface of the raft is the base for the strings, and the multiple instruments form a single instrument with many notes. Each tube zither in the raft zither has a different note, and the idiochord instruments become a single heterochord instrument. The raft zither is also related to the board zither, which uses a board as the base for its many strings.

One example of a raft zither is the Totombito zither, from Congo. Other African examples may be found in Nigeria and East Africa.

In Nepal, the Dhimal people make tube zithers of bouquet grass, and connect them into a raft zither called a tunjaai. In the Nepali instrument, the tubes have two strings, top and bottom, and the instrument is hung on a shoulder, with both hands of the musician working to play at the same time with a plectrum.
