= Yalamber Baja =

Nepali tube zither

Yalamber Baja यलम्बर बाजा, Yalambara
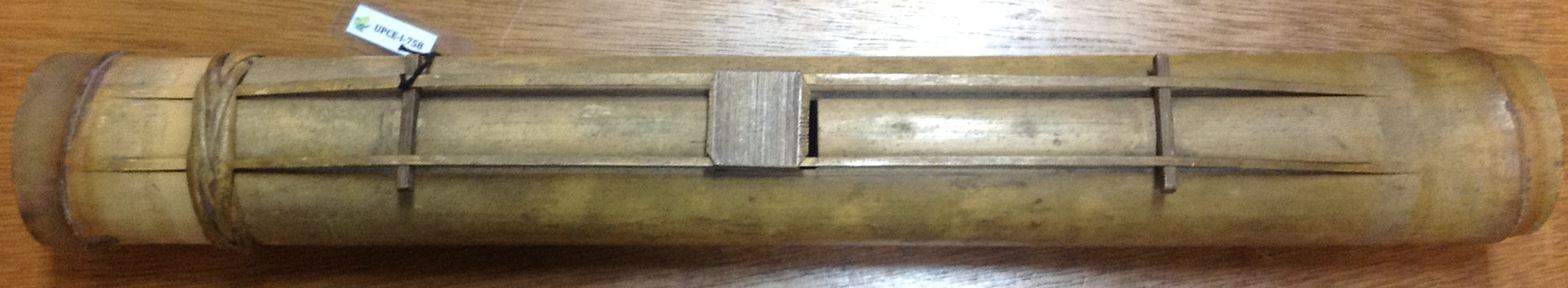
- Tube zither in a style similar to a Yalamber Baja.

Other instrument
- Other names: Yalamber यलम्बर
- Classification: Chordophone
- Hornbostel–Sachs classification: 312.11 tube zithers (Instruments which consist solely of a vaulted string bearer, the instrument's sound is produced by strings made from the vaulted surface. whole tube, idiochord.)
- Developed: Developed in South Asia and/or Southeast Asia. Pictures in Southeast Asia date back to the 10th century A.D.

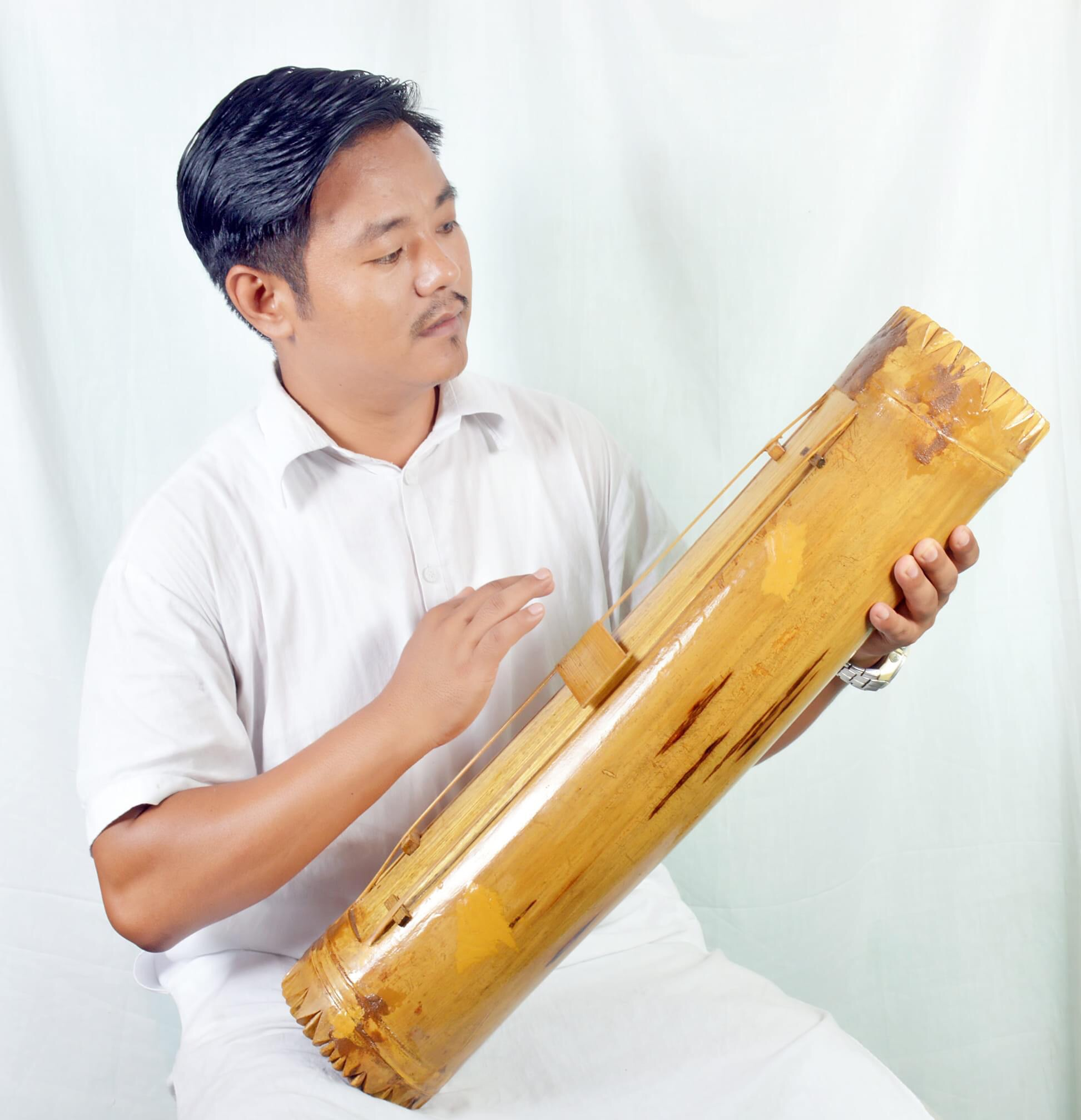
Man playing a yalambar.

The Yalamber or Yahamber Baja (यलम्बर बाजा) is a Nepali tube zither in the Kirati tradition. It is one of three tube-zithers documented in Nepal by the Nepali Folk Musical Instruments Museum in 2004.

Instruments in Nepal tend to be created and named locally. While similar instruments may be found elsewhere in the country, each place has its own traditions for creating, naming and playing musical instruments. Yalamber was a Kirati king, and the instrument may have been named after him. Baja is a Nepali word for instrument.

The Yalamber is a length of bamboo with the ends of the bamboo opened to create a tube. The instrument includes the swelled nodes where the bamboo length was joined to a bamboo length on either side. The dimensions are based upon the piece of bamboo chosen, approximately 45 cm long x 13 to 20 cm diameter. In the center on one side a rectangular hole is cut, approximately 7.5 cm x 2 cm. large. On either side of the hole, a strip of bamboo of bamboo is cut to create a string or "choyaa." Each string is lifted and small pieces of bamboo are placed underneath the string on each end to act as bridges. The string can be tuned by moving bridges toward the end or center, to change the tension on the string. Finally a piece of bamboo is fitted onto the strings, over the top of the hole.

The instrument is a "talbaja," rhythm instrument. With two notes, it can play the role of a drum. A player uses the instrument by holding it and plucking the bamboo (suspended onto the strings) with the thumb. The instruments are tuned so that plucking on either side will sound a different note.

== See also ==
- Music of Nepal
