= Tube zither =

Musical instrument

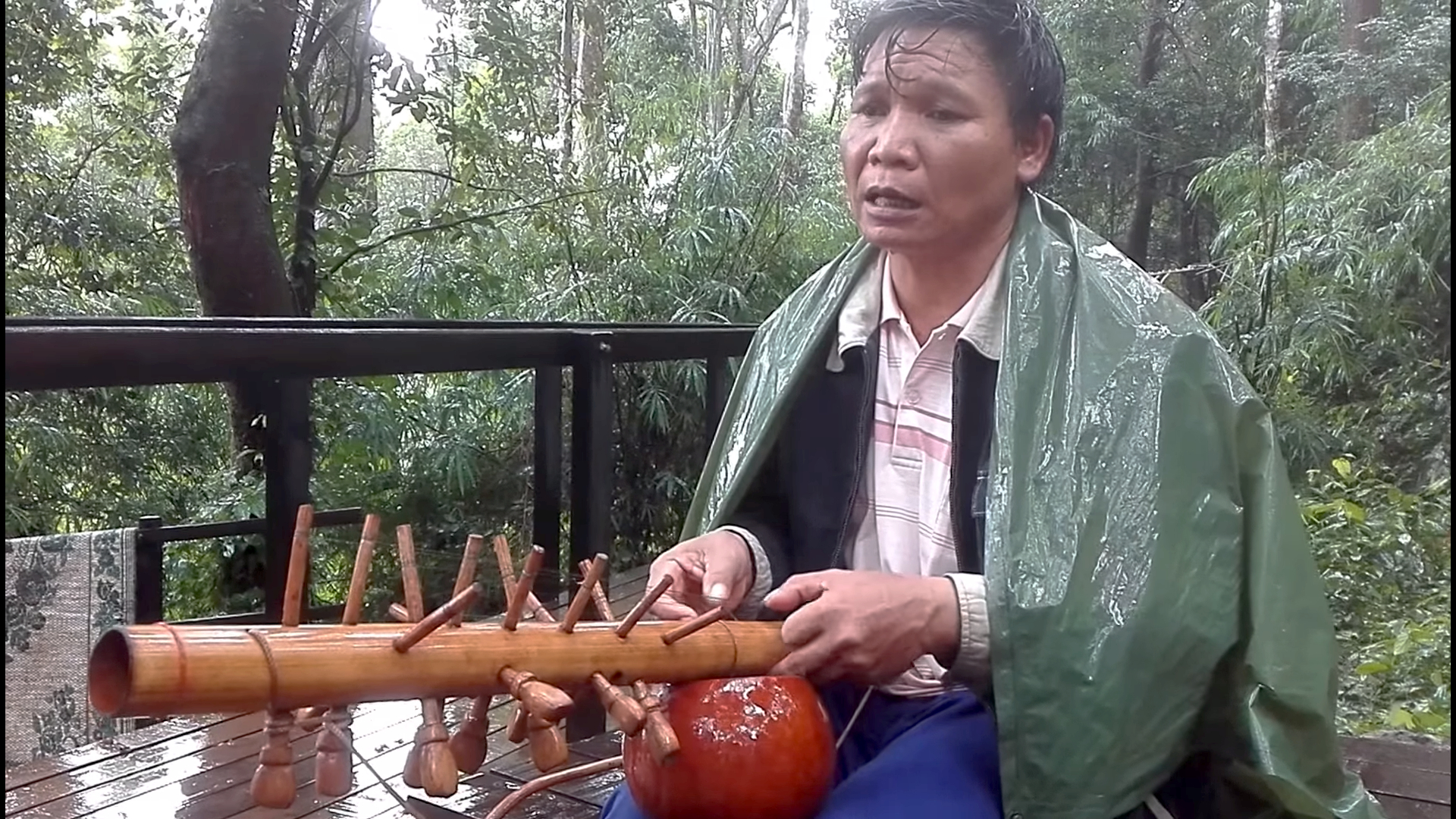
- Modern form of tube zither among highland minority groups in Cambodia, Vietnam and Thailand. It may be held against the chest. This particular instrument is the kong ring គង់រេង, which can substitute for a chorus of gongs, quietly.

String instrument
- Classification: String instrument Chordophone Plucked string instrument Bowed string instrument Percussion stringed instrument
- Hornbostel–Sachs classification: List of chordophones by Hornbostel–Sachs number (312, simple chordophone, tube zither: 312.11 tube zither, whole, idiochord; 312.12 tube zither, whole, heterochord; 312.121.71 heterochord tube zither, whole, no extra resonator, played with bow; 312.21 half-tube zithers, idiochord; 312.22 half-tube zithers, heterochord)
- Developed: Developed in South Asia and/or Southeast Asia. Variation visible in art and literature for more than 1000 years.
- Decay: bamboo strings, fast decay; metal strings, decay is slower

The tube zither is a stringed musical instrument in which a tube functions both as an instrument's neck and its soundbox. As the neck, it holds strings taut and allows them to vibrate. As a soundbox, it modifies the sound and transfers it to the open air. The instruments are among the oldest of chordophones, being "a very early stage" in the development of chordophones, and predate some of the oldest chordophones, such as the Chinese Se, zithers built on a tube split in half. Most tube zithers are made of bamboo, played today in Madagascar, India, Southeast Asia and Taiwan. Tube zithers made from other materials have been found in Europe and the United States, made from materials such as cornstalks and cactus.

There are both round and half tube zithers, as well as tube zithers with the strings cut out of the bamboo body, idiochordic, or, rarely, have separate strings, heterochordic.

== Cultural connections ==
The areas where the bamboo tube zither has been used was connected by trade and migrations of people. One widespread group who still have some members using the bamboo-tube zither today were the Austronesian peoples, inhabiting an area that includes Madagascar, Southeast Asia, Oceania and Taiwan.

Musicologists use iconography, linguistics, and literature to look for clues about existence and traits of musical instruments in the past, as well as modern instrument and variations among them. From these clues they create a history, basing their story of the instrument on the clues they have uncovered. Existing instruments, names in different languages, methods of manufacture and playing, music theory and tonal systems all offer clues to instrument origins. Among the historical trends in the background of the bamboo tube zither, traders from India sailed east and "passed the Malay peninsula" by the 6th century b.c. Indonesians sailed west to Madagascar by the 1st century A.D. By the 3rd century a.d, Buddhists were making statues in Java, and by the 7th century A.D. the "Indianized" Srivijaya empire (650-1377) was founded in Sumatra. The Khmer Empire (802-1431 a.d.) was founded in the 9th century a.d. Wars among countries (including the Khmer Empire, Champa) (192–1832) and Đại Việt caused people to migrate overland, including a defeated tribe from the Tonkin plains in modern Vietnam moving overland eastward to Assam near North India.

Currently known evidence in pictures for the tube zither and bar zither dates to between the 7th and 10th centuries AD. The history of the tube zithers is interconnected with that of bar zithers. It may not always be possible to tell from the artwork if a stick or a thin bamboo tube is being depicted on a relief artwork.

== Basic divisions ==
Tube zithers can be divided by the materials used to create the tube and strings. They can be divided by the method used to get sound from the strings. They can be divided by the way the strings are arranged on the tube, which can interact with the way the strings are sounded. They can be divided by whether the tube is a whole tube or a half tube.

Most tube zithers are made from bamboo, a material that is naturally hollow. Other plants have been adapted to make tubes, including cactus and breadfruit trees. Half zithers are made of both bamboo and of curved-wood boards, as much a board zither as a tube zither.

After addressing the device used to stretch the strings, a tube as opposed to a stick for a bar-zither, Hornbostel-Sachs divides the tube zithers into two types, based on the types of strings they use: idiochord and heterochord. Idiochord tube zithers have "strings" which are made from the material of the tube itself. With bamboo, the surface of the tube is cut and peeled into strips, leaving both ends still attached to the tube. Small pieces of bamboo are put under the strip to make it tight. The tight strip of bamboo acts as a string and can be plucked, hammered or bowed. Heterochord tube zithers use a separate material for strings, such as wire, fishing line or guitar strings. The strings are secured to the tube on each end, and tension is placed on them. Some resemble the idiochord zithers, the string put through holes in the tube, secured there and bamboo put underneath to make them taut. Another version secures one end through a hole in the tube, the other end wrapped around a peg that can be tightened.

Another way of looking at the instruments is the way strings are arranged on the tube. Polychordal tube zithers circle the tube with string-rows. In contrast, parallel-string zithers have strings arranged in parallel, often only one pair for the tube and linked together so that they sound together.

Tube zithers may be plucked chordophones, tapped or struck percussion chordophones or bowed chordophones.

== Bamboo ==
The bamboo-tube zither exists in the 21st century in pockets from Madagascar, to India, Southeast Asia and the Philippine Islands of Northern Luzon and Mindanao. Historically, it was found in India and China, where in the 21st century the Rudra veena and non-bamboo guzheng are modern relations. The basic instruments were constructed by cutting strips into the outer edges, raising the strips with wedges to create tension and make idiochord strings. They could be tuned by the positioning of the wedges, tightening and loosening the bamboo-strip strings. Beneath the strips, the holes started below the strips of bamboo were expanded downward, until they went all the way through the side of the tube. Modern instrument makers in Madagascar, Cambodia, Thailand, and Vietnam have taken advantage of modern materials. Fishing line, wire and other modern string materials have been repurposed as musical instrument strings, with pegs to tune the instruments. There is less fall-off of the note with the new materials and the sound of the instruments are different.

The instruments are connected with gongs in cultures in Burma, Cambodia, Vietnam, Indonesia and the Philippines. When hammered, the zithers with bamboo strings have a gong or bell-like tone which rings and falls off. In Indonesia, there have been gong-ensembles made entirely of bamboo instruments, and some groups use a word for gong in the instruments' names (such as ogoeng boeloeg [gong bamboo]).<--verify--> Where gongs are a public instrument, the polychord bamboo-zithers can be used privately in the home. Furthermore, with a tube-zither, a musician can play music that normally takes an entire group of gongs. Kolitong and kulibaw mimic the cyclic sequence of the gangsa (ensembles of flat gongs). For this, the six strings of the kolitong are tuned exactly to the pitch of the gongs.

- Cambodia: Kong
- Indonesia: Kolintang gong) Kolitong zither
- Tagalog: Agong
- Sumatra: Ogoeng
- Vietnam: Goong, bro

=== Africa ===
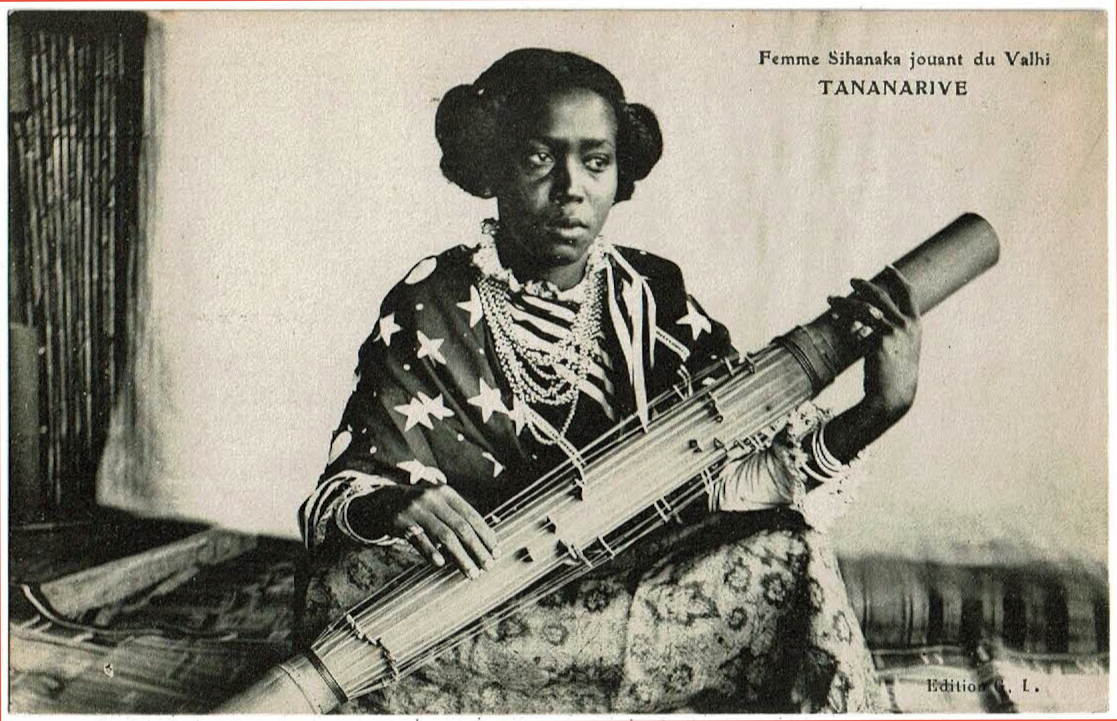
Sihanaka woman in Antananariv, Madagascar playing a valiha, pre 1912 A.D.

The tube zither, called valiha, arrived in Madagascar in the 15th century a.d. with the Hova people, from Indonesian Archipelago. Two forms exist. The traditional form has as many as 14 strings cut and raised from the bamboo tube. Starting in the 20th century, the bamboo strips were replaced by metal strings, changing the instrument's sound.

Africa also uses the raft zither, in which tube zithers are put together into a single musical instrument. One example of a raft zither is the Totombito zither, from Congo. Other African examples may be found in Nigeria and East Africa.

=== Southeast Asia ===
The instruments were used differently, depending on the cultures. In Cambodia, the Kong ring was plucked, used as a substitute for the sound of a circle of gongs, similar to the way a piano can substitute for an orchestra. In the Philippines, the zither strings were plucked but also hammered with a stick, like a drum. Off the coast of Burma and Thailand, the Moken people played their kating ga-un with a bow.

Bamboo-tube-zithers the Kong ring in Cambodia, the Đàn goong in Vietnam. The instruments are also found in Burma and Thailand among the Pa'O (Black Karen), Kayaw (Red Karen), Sgaw Karen, Khamu and Shan peoples.

The Khamu have more than one kind of bamboo-tube zither, with bamboo strings. The bring is a parallel string zither, used fur percussion. Like other parallel-string percussive bamboo zithers, it has two stings cut from the bamboo, the stings linked together with a thin piece of bamboo, a small hole cut into the tube wall below The connector. The bring is different than many tube zithers, having the two ends of the bamboo tube open. One end is held against the musician's body while playing it, closing that end, and the musician uses a hand to cover and uncover the other hole, changing the sound. They also have zithers designed for plucking.

=== Indonesia, Java, Sumatra ===
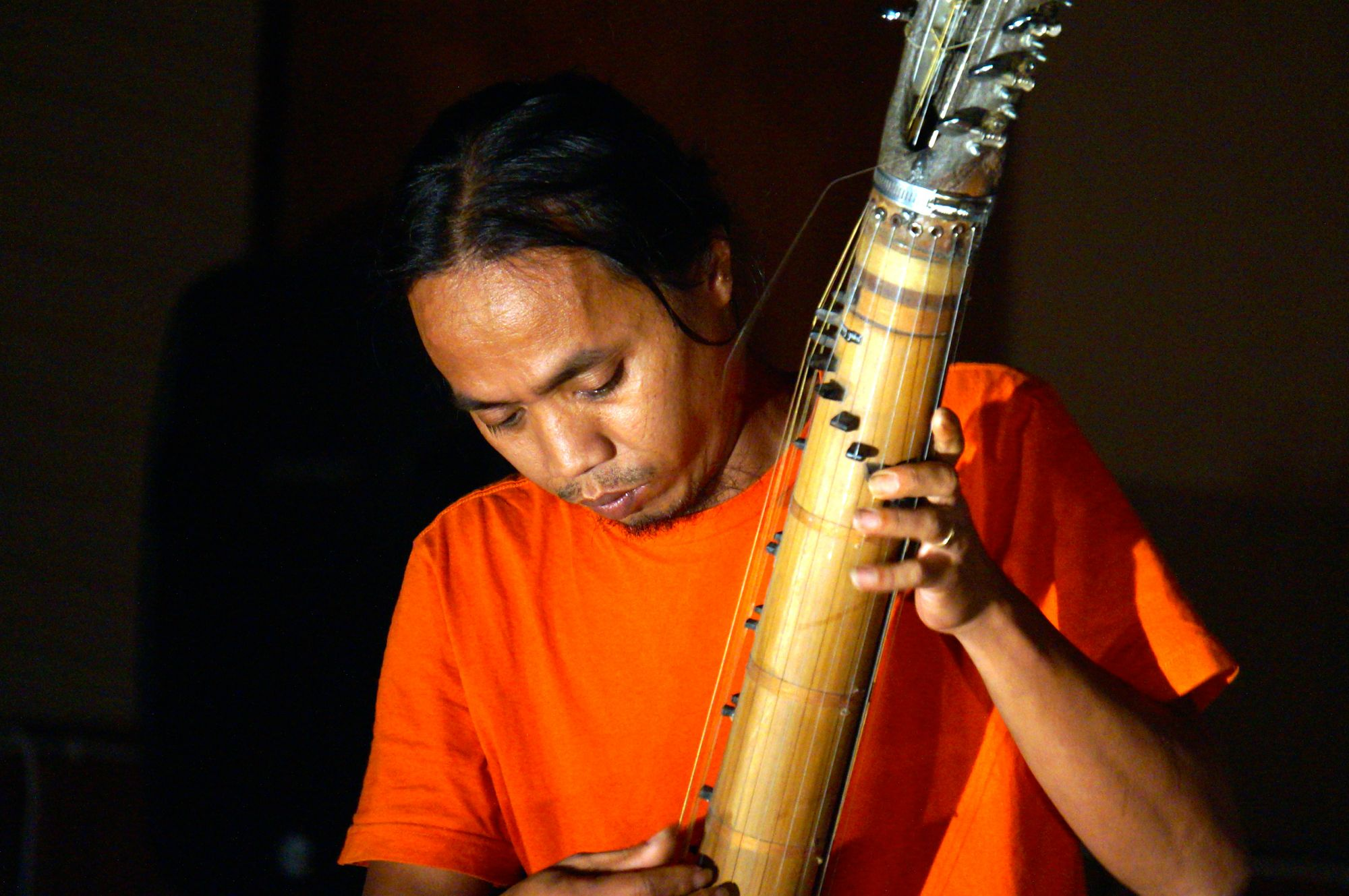
Musician Wukir Suryadi of the Indonesian band Senyawa plays a modernized tube zither. Instead of pegs to tighten metal strings, the instrument has a guitar-style head with mechanical tuners.

Early knowledge of Indonesian musical instruments comes from artwork and literature of the Hindu-Javanese civilization, which began with Hindu colonists in the fifth century AD. Because bamboo instruments decay, evidence of them comes through iconography, images in art, and literature. It is likely that the instruments pre-date their first representation in imagery. The instrument is found in the Kinddung Sunda, a work in Middle Javanese which was used in about the 14th and 15th centuries. In that work, it was called the guntang, and is still called that in Bali. The instrument is found in the Kinddung Sunda, a work in Middle Javanese which was used in about the 14th and 15th centuries. It is also present in the "entire archipelago" but under different names, including the gumbeng or bumbeng.

Instruments may be created with single strings, pairs of strings (parallel strings), and with three or more strings (polychordal). The number of strings influences how they are played. Instruments with three or fewer strings are played like drums, the strings beaten with a stick. Instruments with three or more strings may be plucked with the thumbnails. These may also be played with a combination of thumbnail and stick, the player moving back and forth between plucked and hammered notes.

==== Ensembles, gumbeng and chelempung ====
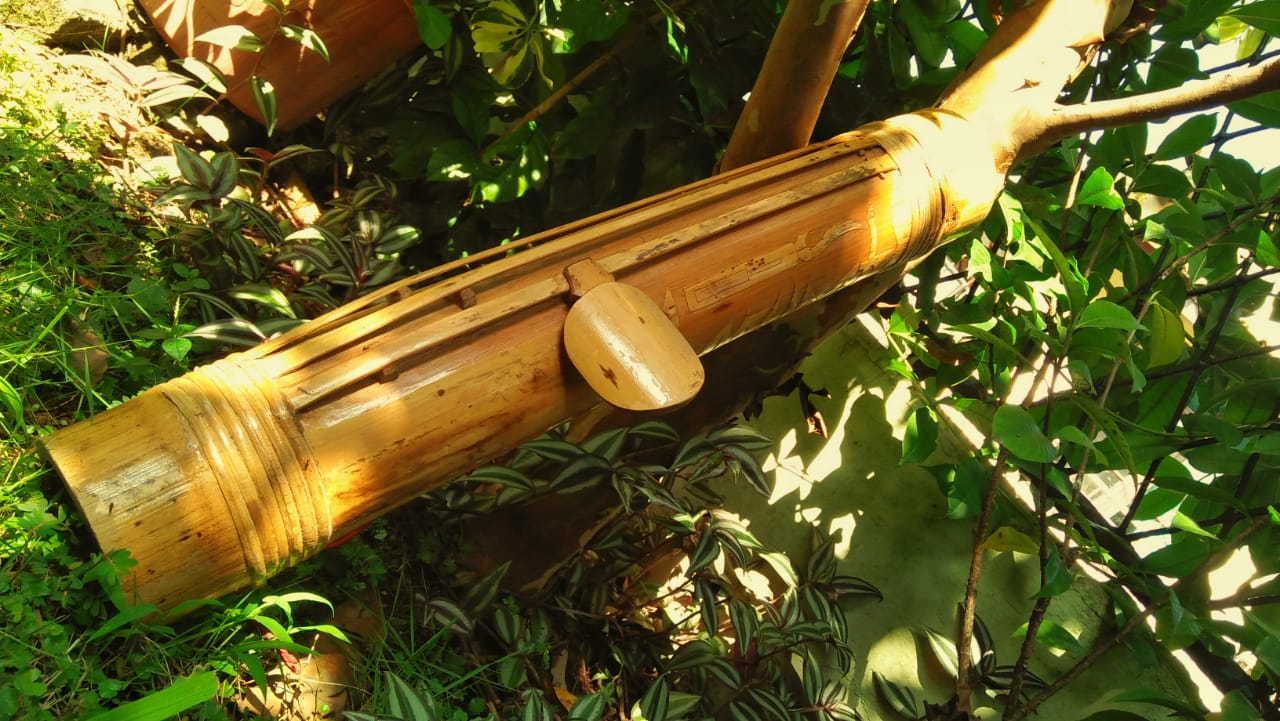
A Sundanese celempung.

The traditional ensemble music of Indonesia centers around gong and gong-chime based ensembles, called gamelans. The music was imitated with other instruments, including bamboo-based ensembles.

The Gumbeng ensemble includes a polychordal bamboo-tube zither with bamboo strings to play melody, a second bamboo-tube zither set up as a parallel-string instrument (strings connected together and sounding together and functioning as "kempul") another string making "kenong beats", a bamboo-tube (not a zither) functioning as "kedang" by beating open ends of the tube with the palms of the hands, a bamboo-tube instrument blown as a gong.

The chelempung ensemble or celempung, found today on Java and in places under Javanese influence (including Sumatra), consists normally of rows of "bonang" kettle bells, in rows of 3 or 5 bells. However, instruments may substitute for the kettle bells, including a single celempung metal-stringed zither or a chelempung orchestra consisting of idiochord-bamboo tube zithers. In this last ensemble, instruments may be named for their function in the orchestra: the kendang awi (bamboo kendang) replaces the kendang drum; the ketuk awi (bamboo ketuk) replaces the ketuk gong-chime part. Another instrument used with this ensemble is the celempung renteng, which refers to a row (reteng) of parallel-string tube zithers (celempung). This row has tube zithers of different sizes, each playing a different note, like tone-bars on a xylophone. Strings tuned to higher notes imitate the gamelan chimes, and lower note strings imitate gongs.

Another zither used in the chelempung ensemble is a three-string celempung indung. The instrument is polychordal, with strings played individually to make different notes. Bridges can be placed under the strings in the center of two of the strings, allowing even more notes, on either side of the bridge. The lowest note string has been designed to make a "sustained boom" through the use of a flap, over a hole in the bamboo tubing; the flap vibrates with the string and "this sound/energy is transmitted through the length of the tube through the small hole." The kendang drum is imitated by hitting the open end of the tube with the palm of the musician's hand. A player can also influence the pitch of the sound by making the opening on the end of the instrument larger or smaller with the palm of a hand—a completely open hole makes the highest pitch sound, and closing the hole makes the lowest pitched sound.

=== Philippines ===
The Philippines have a variety of names and forms for the bamboo-tube zither, and pluck the instruments add use the for percussion, and in modern times have developed a bowed form. The different versions of names may be the result of transcribing them into English, but may also be the versions of names in different dialects or languages. The instruments are made from a tube of bamboo, about 10 centimeters across, with the ends blocked. The ends may be partially open or the instrument may have added holes or be deliberately cracked to help resonance. The instruments are idiochords, with strings cut from the tube, in strips attached at both ends and given tension with wedges placed between tube and string. They may be polychords, with lengthwise rows of stings spaced out around the tube, or parallel stringed with strings in one or two groups of two.

The instruments may be played in orchestras of bamboo-zithers, "rural gamelan ensembles," in which the instruments take the place of bonang, kenong and kempul gongs.

==== Polychords ====
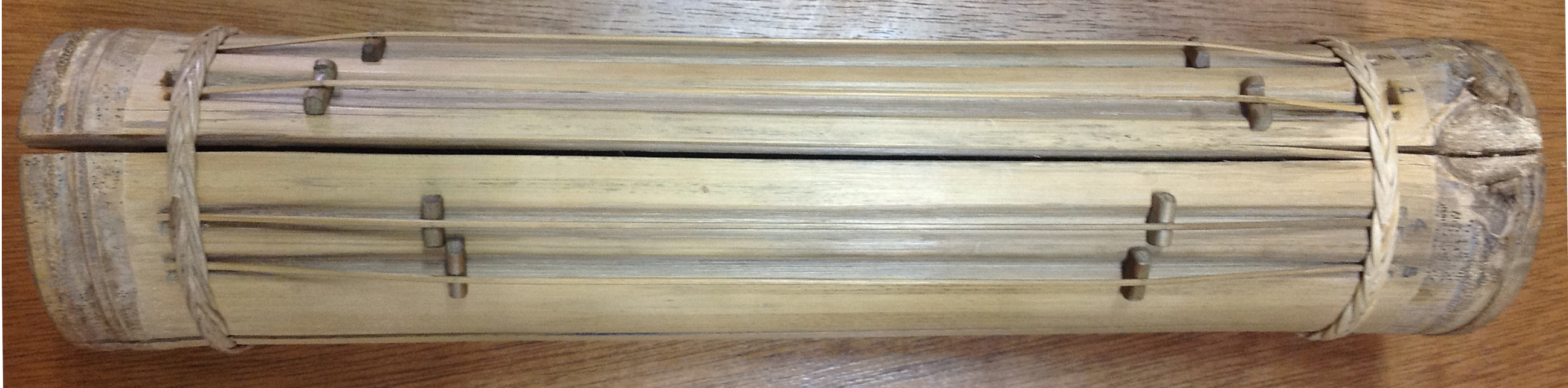
Philippines. Kolitong polychord tube-zither.

The polychordal tube zithers are played on Northern Luzon, Mindanao island and Palawan. On Northern Luzon, the zithers include the Ilongot five-stringed kollesing or kulisin, Bontok kolitong, kollitong, or kullitong, Kalinga six-stringed kolitong and six or eleven-stringed kulibit, Isneg five-stringed ohitang.

On Mindanao the Bagobo call it the taw-go, tugo, or padang. The B’laan or Bilaan, call it sluray, sluday or sloroy. The Subanun call their five-string zither the sigitan. The Maguindanaon call it the tangkel. The Manobo call their seven-stringed zither the tugo, tangkew or takul. The Mansaka call it the takul. The T’boli call it the sludoy or s’ludoi. The Tiruray call their eight-string zither the tangke, tangkel or togo. The Bukidnon Matigsalug name their six-stringed zither the saluray.

On Palawan, it is called the pagang.

==== Parallel-stringed instruments ====
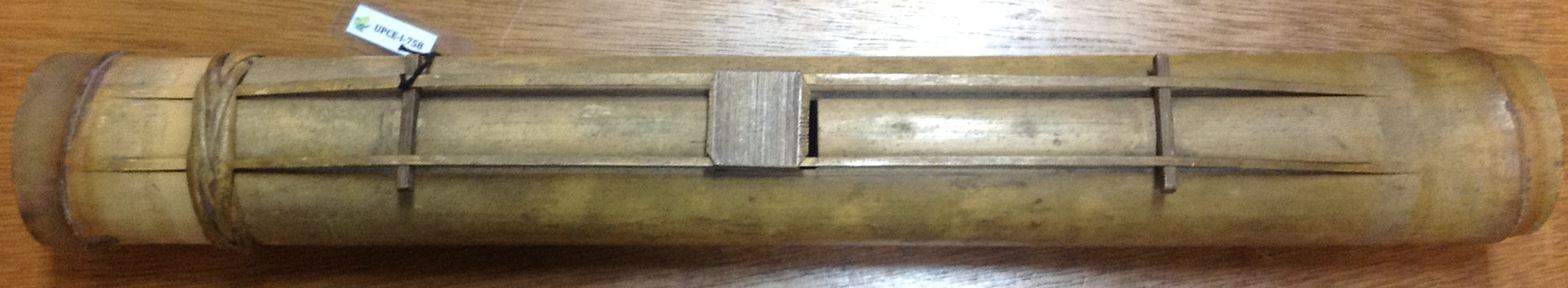
Bukidnon, Philippines. Takumbo parallel-stringed tube zither, used for percussion.

Parallel-stringed tube zithers are used on Mindanao by the Maranao, Tiruray, and Manobo, and on North Luzon by the Isneg. A flattened section is created on a length of bamboo, with a hole in the center. Two strings are cut on the either side of the flattened section. A platform is placed to connect the two stings (above the hole) so that they vibrate together. The instruments may have either one or two pairs of strings and may either be plucked or struck with bamboo sticks.

The Maranao call their zither serongagandi. The Isneg call theirs tadcheng (or variants tedcheng, gacheng and ayudding).

==== Playing methods ====
The Kalinga's six-stringed kulibet is held in the player's hands and plucked. The player uses thumbs on two strings and his middle and index fingers for the other four, plucking alternately with each side to sustain a melody. The Isneg play their five-stringed ohitang in the same manner, plucking with thumbs and fingers. The Ilongglot have a way for two people to play one instrument, the man holding the five-string kollewing in his hands, the woman beating percussion on the strings with bamboo sticks. The subanun play with the holder plucking and the person with sticks tapping the body of the instrument with sticks. The Truray do the same, but it is specifically two women that play with way.

For some entertainment, such as dancing, some groups pair the tube-zither with 2-string kudlong lute, including the Bilaan, T'boli, Vukidnon Matigsalug.

=== India ===
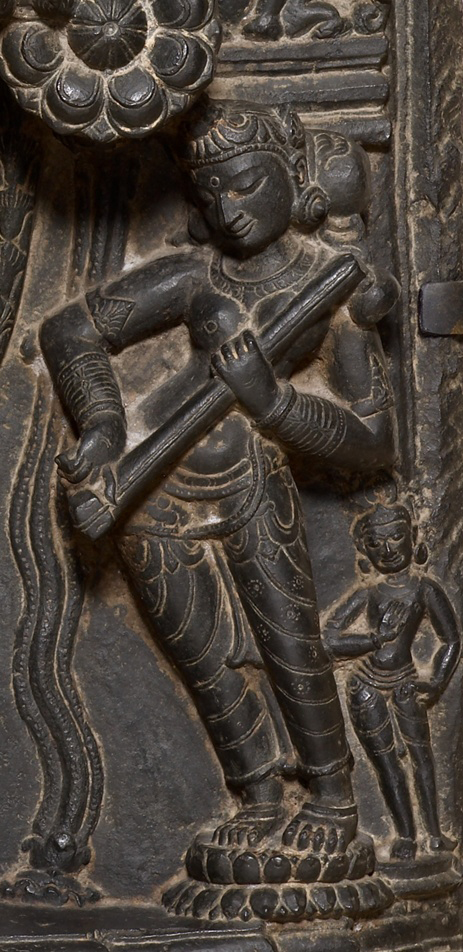
Bangladesh, Pala period 10th-12th century C.E. Saraswati with a tube zither, an alapini veena.

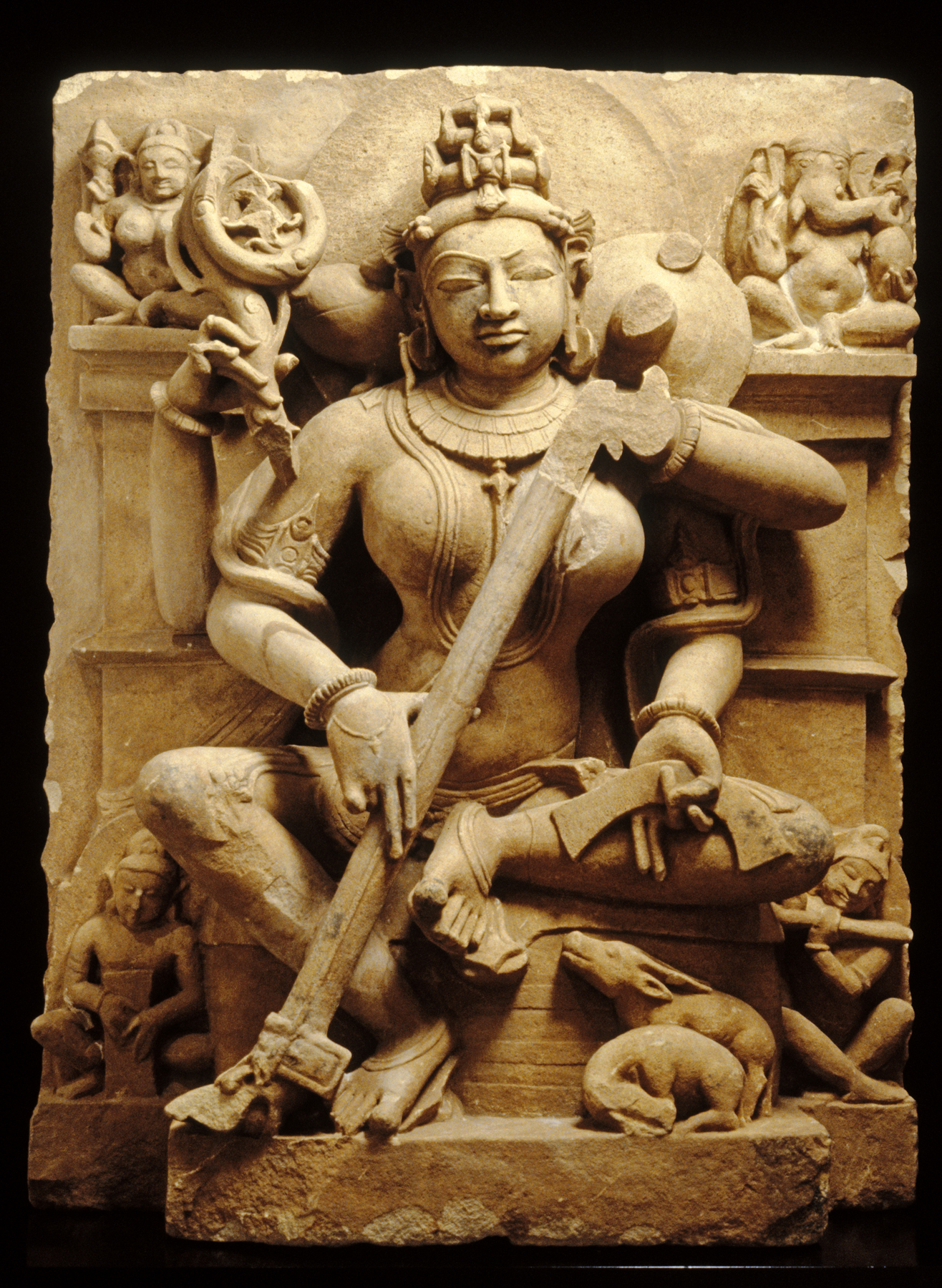
India, 10th century C.E. Image of Saraswati holding an eka-tantri vina. This type would add more gourds and likely become the rudra veena.

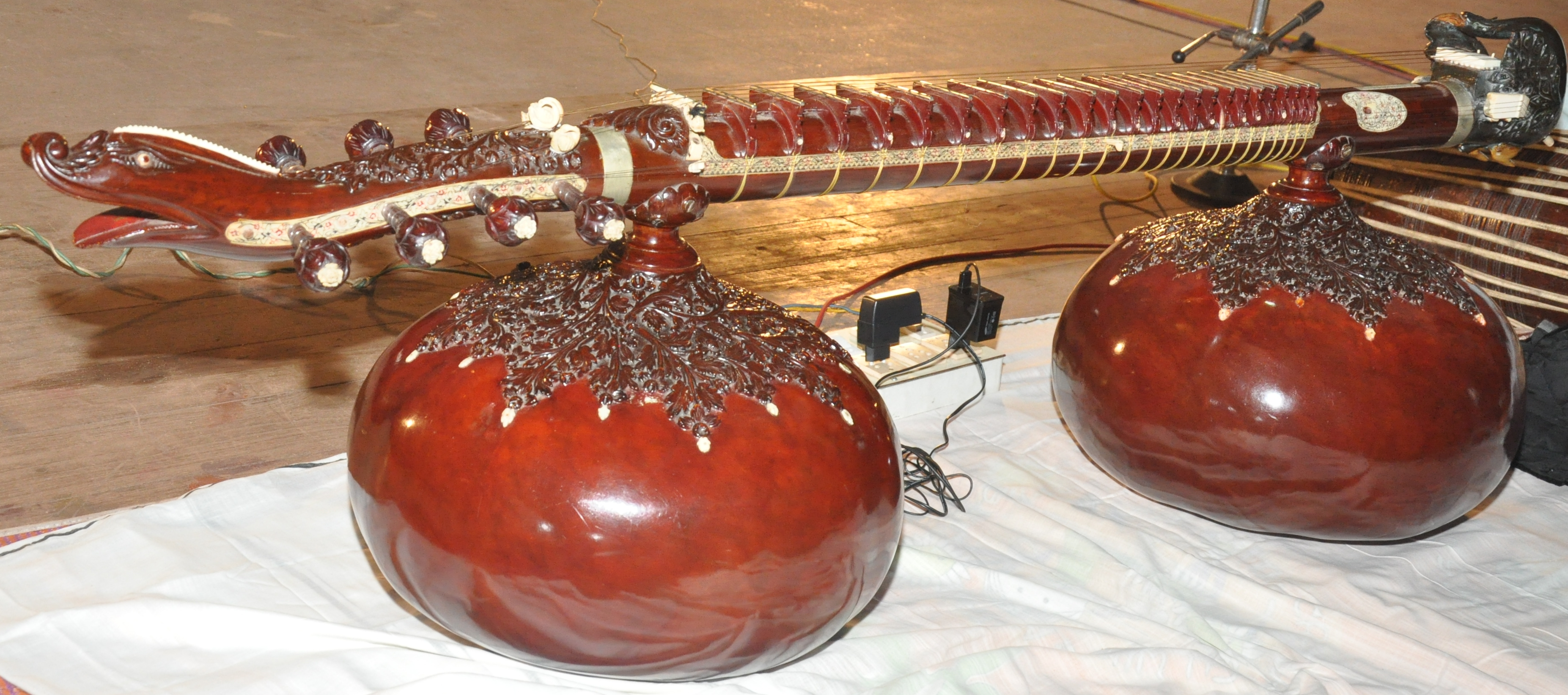
Northern India, Rudra veena.

The Rudra veena (different from the Saraswati veena) is a plucked instrument, a wood or bamboo tube that holds strings and fretboard and has 2 gourd resonators. Early forms included the Alapini Vina and Eka-tantri Vina. Organologists have placed the Rudra veena in different positions in their classifications, either as a bar zither or as a tube zither. As a tube zither, there is a historical connection to other tube zithers. Southeast Asia has a wide variety of development for tube zithers and can't be excluded as the developers of this style of instrument. The tube zithers may have moved from Southeast Asia to Northern India by way of overland trade. The more mainstream view shows stick-zithers with gourds (looking much like the Rudra Veena as possibly a pre-bamboo tube form) went from India to Java.

== Half-tube zithers ==
Musicians have to deal with the shape of their instruments. One method was to attach a gourd to rest the instrument on the ground or lap, or press against the musician's chest. Splitting the bamboo tube in half created an instrument that could lie flat stably.

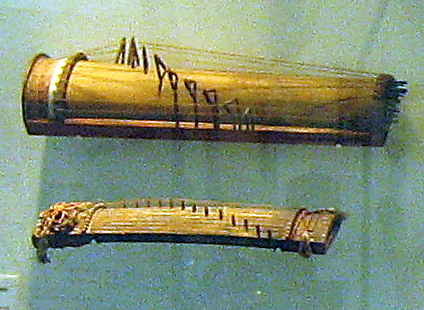
China. Bamboo half-tube zithers, modern reproduction, a prototype for guzheng.

=== Asian zither ===
In antiquity, the Chinese guzheng may have originally been a bamboo-tube zither. That was what was described in the Shuowen Jiezi. Kurt Sachs pointed out that bamboo large enough to form the body of a guzheng only grew in the far south. It would be redesigned later to imitate and use curved boards like the Se to replace the curved half-tube of bamboo. It was also said to have evolved from the Se. In their current form, both instruments are what are described to be board zithers rather than half-tube zithers.

The Japanese Koto is also a half-tube zither. The ancestor of the koto was the Chinese guzheng. It was first introduced to Japan from China in the 7th and 8th century. The first known version had five strings, which eventually increased to seven strings. (It had twelve strings when it was introduced to Japan in the early Nara Period (710–784) and increased to thirteen strings). The Japanese koto belongs to the Asian zither family that also comprises the Chinese zheng (ancestral to the other zithers in the family), the Kazakh jetigen, the Korean gayageum, daejaeng and ajaeng, the Mongolian yatga, the Sundanese kacapi and the Vietnamese dan tranh.

=== Parallel-Stringed Half-Tube Zither ===
The bamboo half-tube zither found in the Philippines among the Ifugao is called tadcheng, tedcheng, gacheng, or ayudding. It has two to four strings which, depending on the style of playing, are plucked with the fingers or struck with small bamboo sticks. Boys and men play the tadcheng for entertainment, often tapping rhythms patterned after those played on the gongs. The Ibaloi of North Luzon also have a half-tube polychord tube zither which they call the kaltsang .

== Bowed tube-zithers ==
=== Mergui Archipelago, Burma and Thailand ===
The Moken people, who live in the Mergui Archipelago in the southern end of Burma, have a two-string bamboo-tube zither, the kating ga-un which they pluck and bow. The instrument, made from a tube of bamboo about 622 millimeters (24.48 inches) long and 48–52 mm (1.8 — 2 inches) across, was originally strung with plant fibers or gut from sharks or dogs. The Moken have modernized their instrument, using nylon fishing line in place of the plant or gut strings. One long string is folded in half and the folded bight is hooked onto the lower end of the instrument. The two string-ends are each tightened and tied at the top of the instrument. The strings are held off the bottom of the instrument with a bridge. The bow is made of bamboo, with a strip of rattan for a bowstring and bee's wax for rosin. The bamboo tube is closed at the bottom and open at the top, and three holes are burned through the bamboo in the lower half of the instrument. The sound radiates upward, so that the player hears it best. The bow is stored inside the bamboo tube.

The instrument strings are tuned "approximately a fourth apart" at "roughly F4 — A#4". The musician plays the instrument by using a bow on the strings, fingers underneath the strings at the top of the instrument. The musician raises and lowers tension on the strings, changing the pitch of the notes, in a roughly "four-tone scale." The higher-pitched string is used to play melody, and the lower-pitched string is occasionally played as a drone, providing "heterophony."

The kating ga-un is played as part of the religious life-view of the Moken people. The two strings represent ancestral couples, and the musician, by playing the instrument, has "dialogue with the entities of the mythical past."

=== Arizona ===
The White Cloud and San Carlos Apache people in Arizona developed a bowed-tube zither in the 1800s, called today, the Apache fiddle. The instrument was made from the hollowed-out stem of an agave cactus, the top sealed with piñón pine pitch, a wedge driven up through the bottom of the instrument so that the edge of the wedge supported the weight of the bridge from inside. The instrument and bow were both strung with horsehair, the hair on the fiddle twisted into a tight string, the hair on the bow straight. The tuning peg tightened the fiddle string to "C# below middle C."

It may have been played as well by the Yakutat people (part of the Tlingit of the northwest coast of North America. The Diegueno of Southern California had a bowed instrument, as well, and the Seri people on Tiburón Island, although the Seri's traditional fiddle was the enneg.

The tone of the instrument was "a faint dry squeak", characterized humorously by Apaches as the "buzz, buzz, sound." They also called it "wood singing."

== Related instruments ==
This list does not attempt to include all variations. Some instruments may be known by more than one name.

Brunei

- Tangkong (Kedayan)

Cambodia

- Kong ring, (Mondulkiri Province) plucked
- Bunong people (Mondulkiri Province), plucked 6-string bamboo idiochord
- gung treng, Tampuan people (Ratanakiri Province) 9-stringed tube zither, metal strings, plucked

India

- Alapini vina, historic
- Dhutang, Assam
- Eka-tantri vina, historic
- Guda (Thadou), Manipur
- Kinnari vina, historic
- Pak-Dol or Veddur-Dol (Maria Gond people) Jabalpur
- Rudra veena modern form

Indonesia

Bali
- Guntang

Java
- Gumbeng (Javanese people)
West Java
- Celempung indung (Sundanese people) (polychordal), percussion
- Celempung reteng (Sundanese people) (parallel), percussion row of instruments
- Kendang awi (bamboo zither playing kendang role)
Rote Island
- Sasando plucked
Sumatra
- gondang buluh (Mandailing people)
- Keteng-Keteng (Karo people) 2-string percussion
- Mengmung(Toba Batak people)
- Tanggetong (Toba Batak people)
- also Ogoeng-ogoeng boeloe (bamboo gong)
- Tatabuang (Halmahera island)
West Sumatra
- Talempong Botuang (Minangkabau people) (polychordal) plucked and drummed
Sumba
- Gogah 5-string polychord, plucked with fingers & pick

Jamaica

- Benta

Laos

- Bring (Khamu people)

Madagascar

- Valiha plucked

Malaysia

- Karaniing
- Kereb (Temiar people), 2-string heterochord, plucked
- Lutong (Kenyah people) (Sarawak) 4-6 strings
- Krem (Jah Hut people), heterochord, parallel strings, tapped
- Pagong (Penan people), (Borneo). 4-string instrument, plucked.
- Pergram (Jah Hut people) idiochord
- Satong (Kejaman-Lasah people) (Kajang people) (Sarawak)
- Semang people tube zither (Perak)
- Tongkungon polychord, 4-8 strings (Sabah) plucked & percussion

Myanmar (Burma)

- Kayah Karen people tube zither
- Paplaw (Sgaw Karen people)
- Tiktung (Pa'O Karen people)

Mergui Archipelago
- Kating ga-un (Moken people) bowed

Nepal

- Bhante Madal. (Tamang people) 2-String bamboo drum (madal). Dendrocalamus hookeri bamboo.
- Tunjaai. (Dhimal people). Tube zithers of Bouquet grass connected together into board zither or raft zither. Picked/strummed with plectrum.
- Yalambar / Yalamber Baja (यलम्बर (बाजा)) (Kirati people) 2-string bamboo drum

Philippines

Luzon
- Kolitong (Kalinga people) polychord 6-11 strings whole tube or half-tube, plucked and percussion
- Kulibit (Kalinga) polychord 6-11 strings
- Kollesing (Ilongot)
- Takumbo (Kalinga people, Isneg people) parallel-strings, percussion and plucked
- Tambi (Kalinga people) percussion 2-string parallel
Mindanao
- Sludoy, salorai, saluray, saluroy, saw-ray, 5-strings polychord, plucked (Tboli people, B'laan people, Manobo people)
- taw-go, tugo, togo, takul, tankew, tangkel, polychord, (Bagobo people, Maguindanao people, Manobo people, Mansaka people, Tiruray people)
- padang, polychord, (Bagobo people)
Palawan
- Pagang, polychord (Palawan people)

Taiwan

- Kango’ngo’an (Saisiyat people) monochord, idiochord, percussion zither

Thailand

- Maniq people tube zither

United States

- Apache fiddle bowed
- Cornstalk fiddle, idiochord, (gingara or dječje guslice, Serbia) (cirokhegedű or kucoricahegedű, Hungary)

Vietnam

- Đàn brố (Bahnar, Xơ Đăng, Êđê, Gia Rai people and Giẻ Xtiêng peoples) plucked
- Đàn bầu version made from bamboo tube, 1 string, plucked
- Đàn goong (Bru people) heterochord, plucked
- Đàn K'ni (Bahnar people, Jarai people, Xo Dang people, 2-string heterochord, 3rd string to player's mouth
- Đàn Ta lư bamboo-tube version, 2-string heterochord
- Tol alao (Bahnar people)5-string idiochord, plucked by women

== Gallery ==
=== Bowed ===
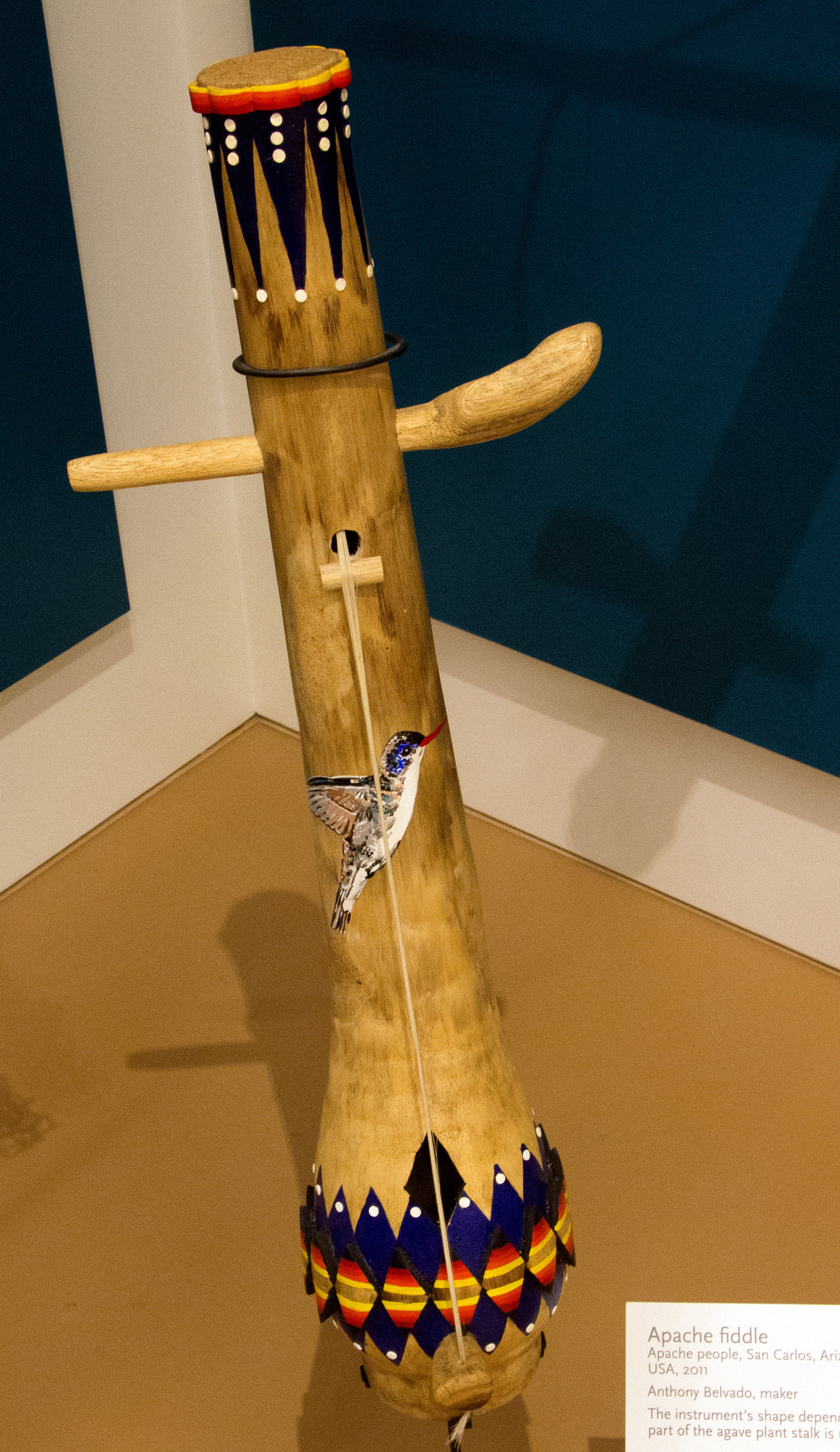
Arizona, 2011. Apache fiddle, agave stalk for tube.

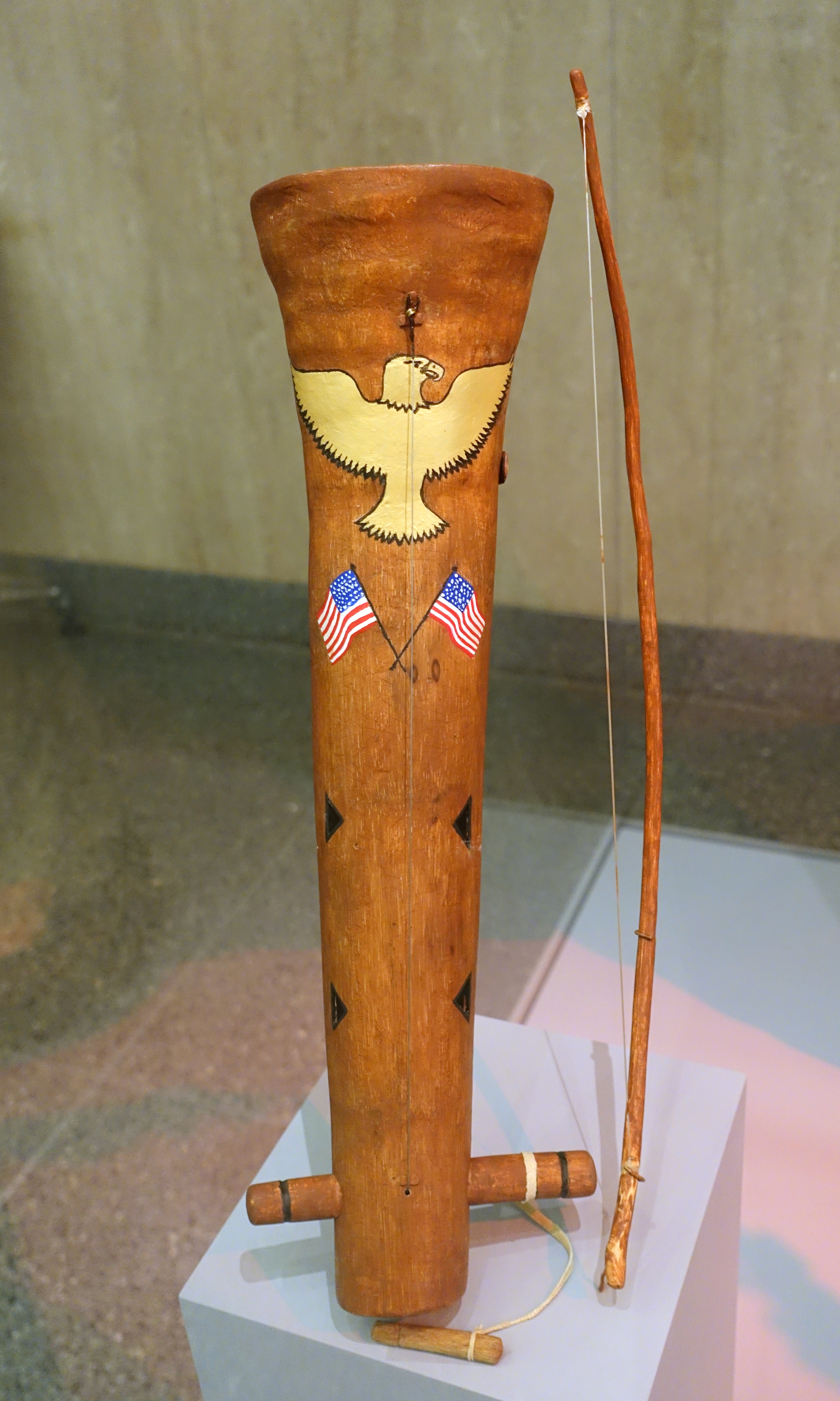
Arizona 1996. Apache fiddle with bow.

=== Plucked ===
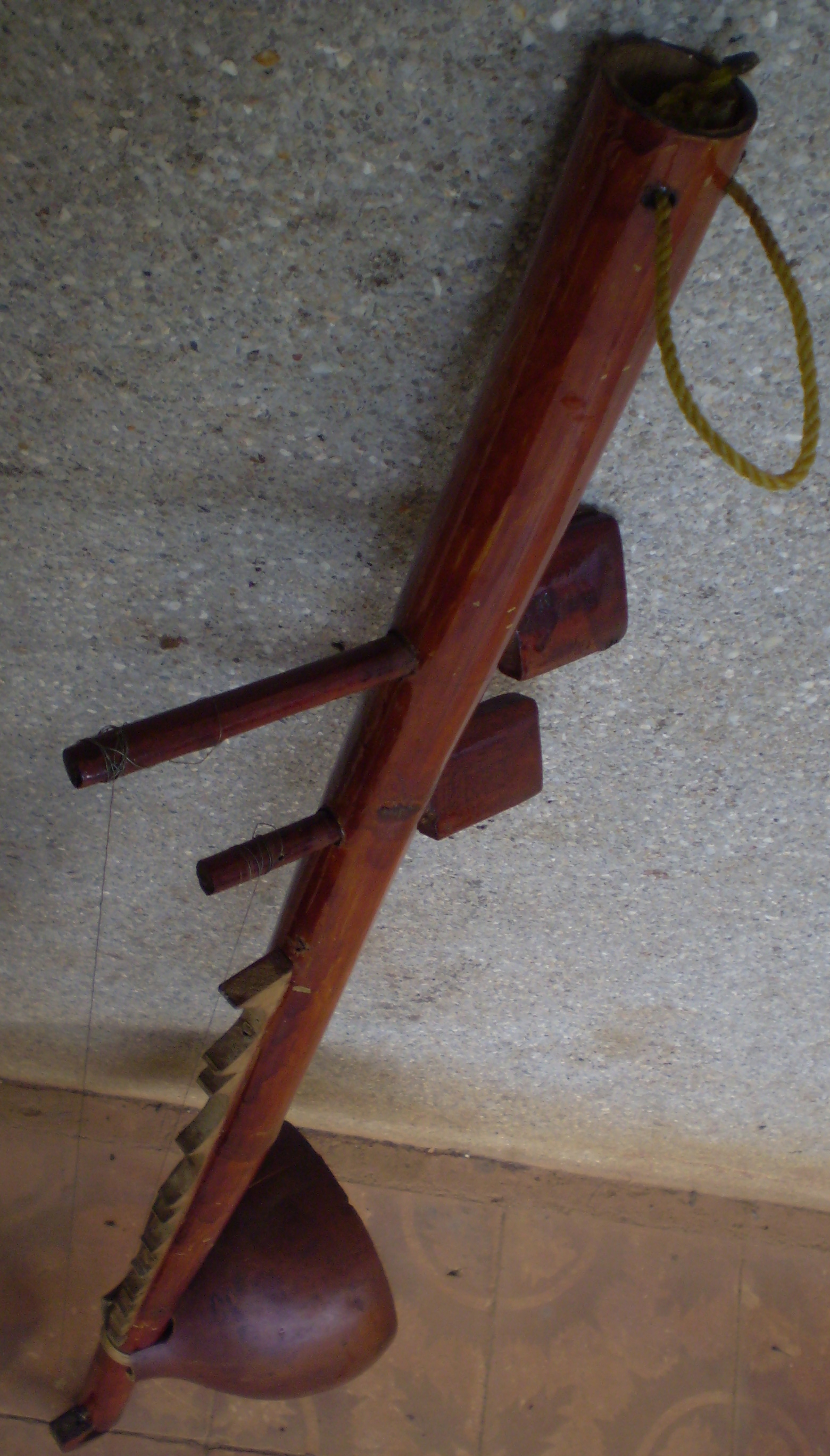
Vietnam. Bro with tuning pegs for wire strings, resonator gourd.

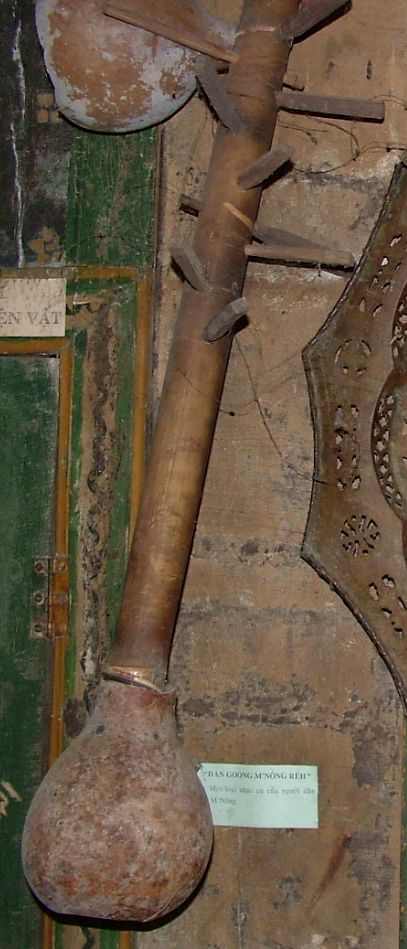
Vietnam. Đàn goong with tuning pegs for wire strings. Gourd on bottom. Goong means gong.

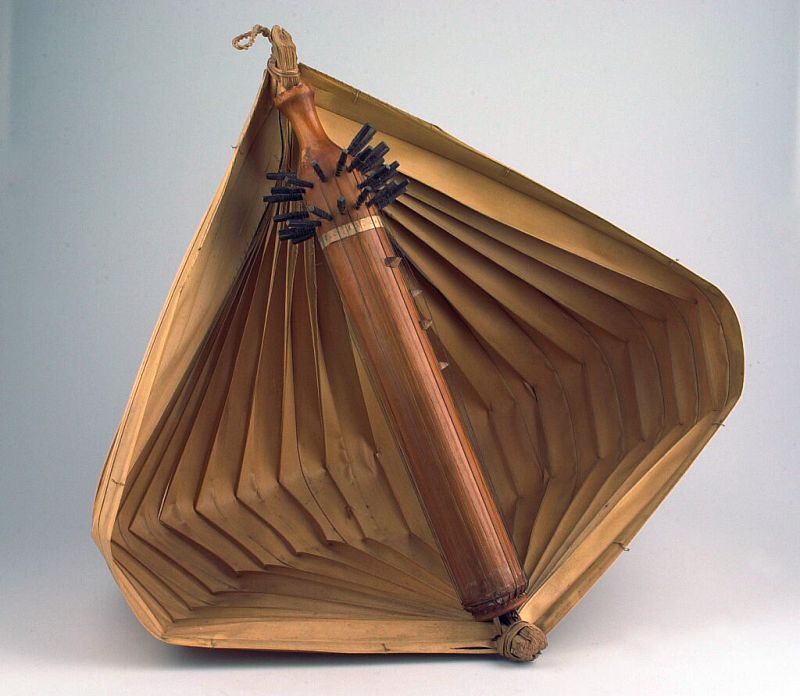
Rote Island, Indonesia. Sasando bamboo-tube zither with wire strings and leaf resonator.

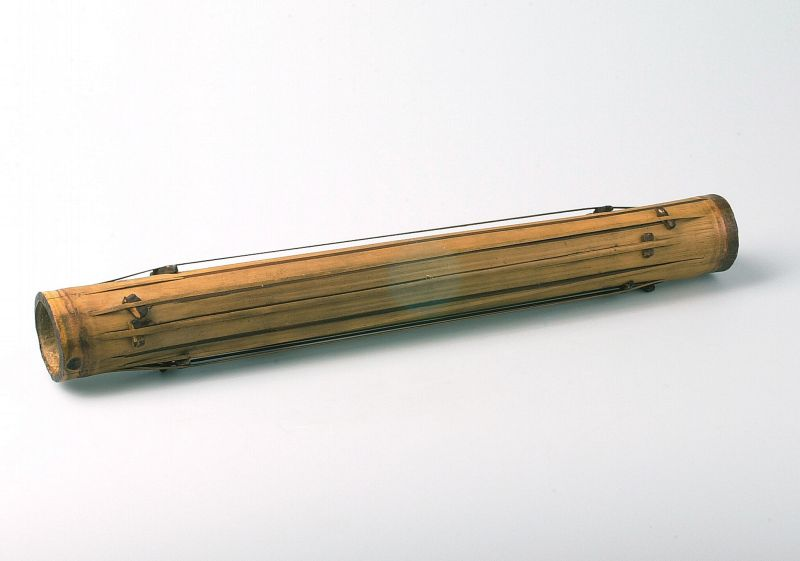
North Sumatra, Indonesia, Toba Batak people, c. 1852. Tanggetong. Also called gondang buluh. Gondang, Indonesian for Ficus variegata. "Buluh," Indonesian for bamboo. Tube zither with idiochord strings (strings made from the tube itself). Polychord.

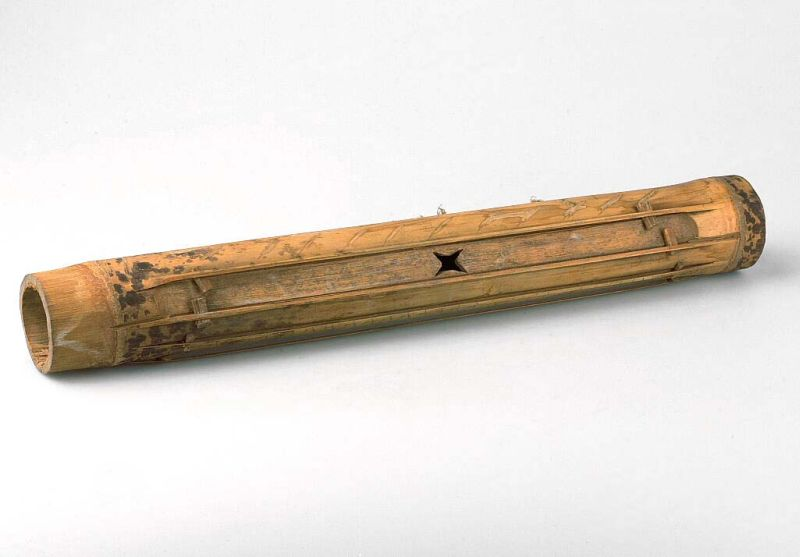
Indonesia. Lamanole Village, East Flores. Tatabuang. Bamboo. These were also made of breadfruit limbs, hollowed out. Polychord.

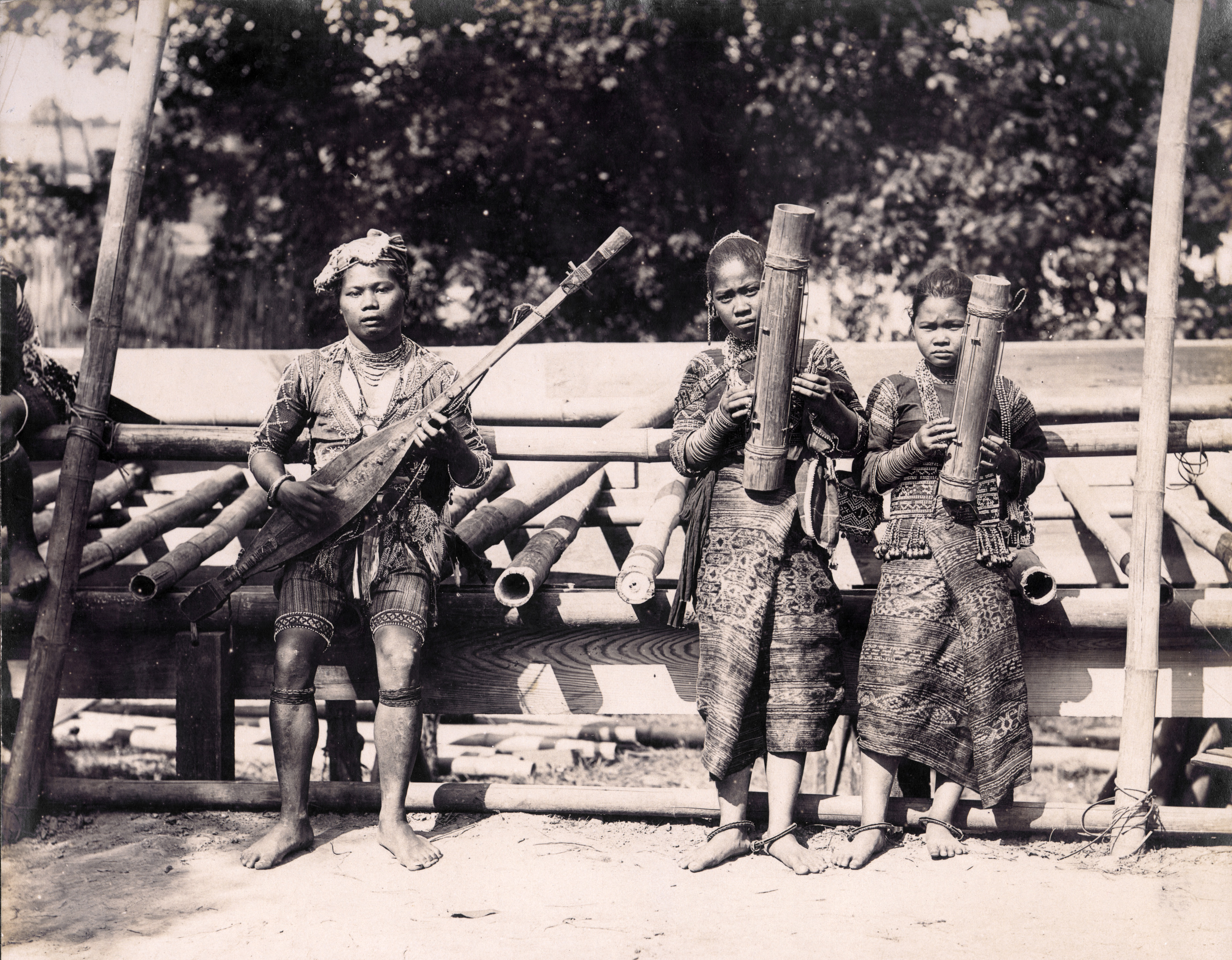
Philippines. Bagabo musicians exhibited at the Louisiana Purchase Exposition in St. Louis, 1904. The girls hold tube zithers [possibly saluray], and the man holds a kutiyapi lute.

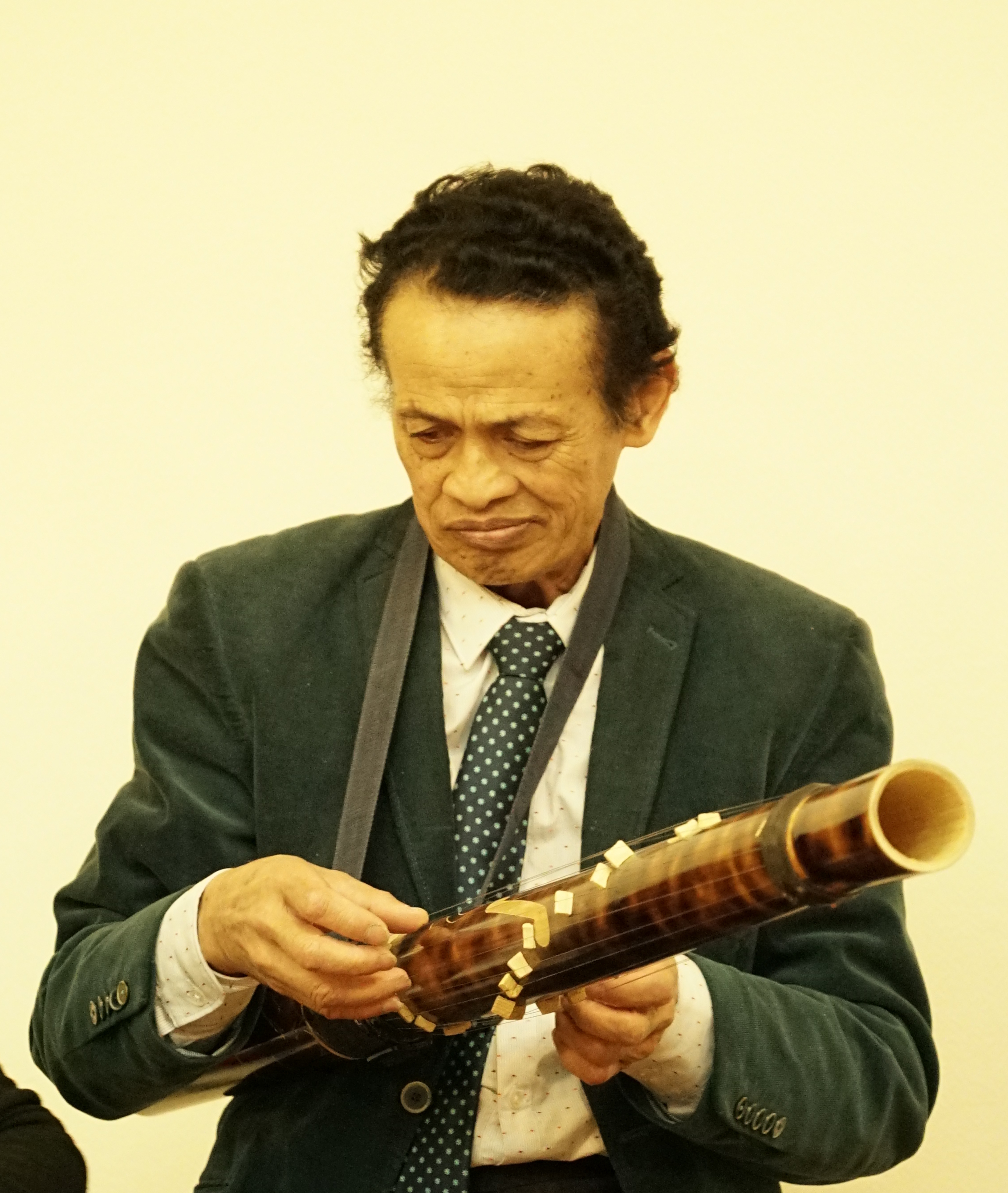
Madagascar. Valiha, modern with metal strings. The instrument's soundboard-surface has a modern finish.

Bamboo strings; valiha plucked or struck with stick, playing folk song, Iny Hono Izy Ravorona - Take Him-Her With You O Bird.

Metal strings; valiha plucked, playing a folk song.

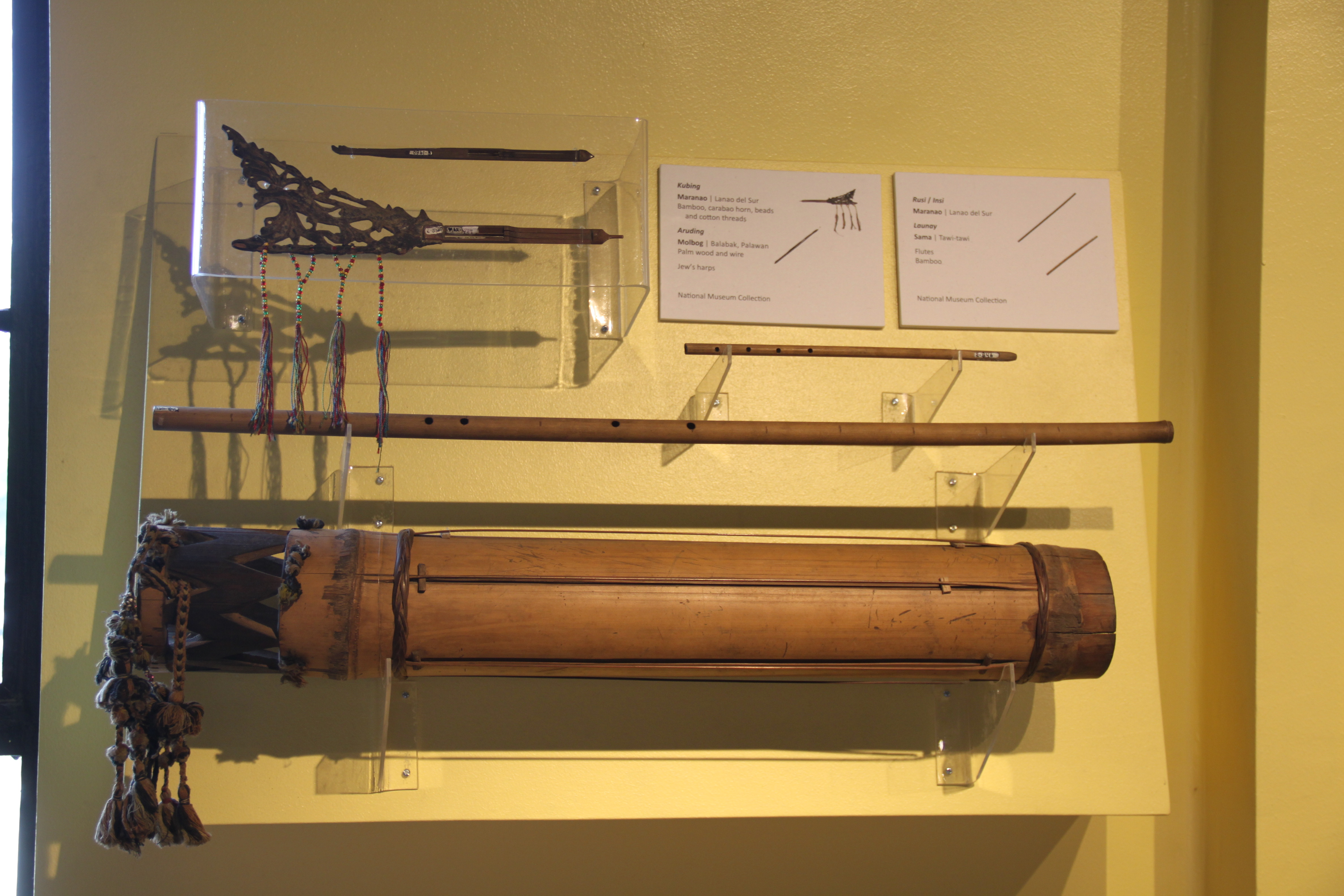
Philippines. Not clear if plucked or tapped with stick like a drum.

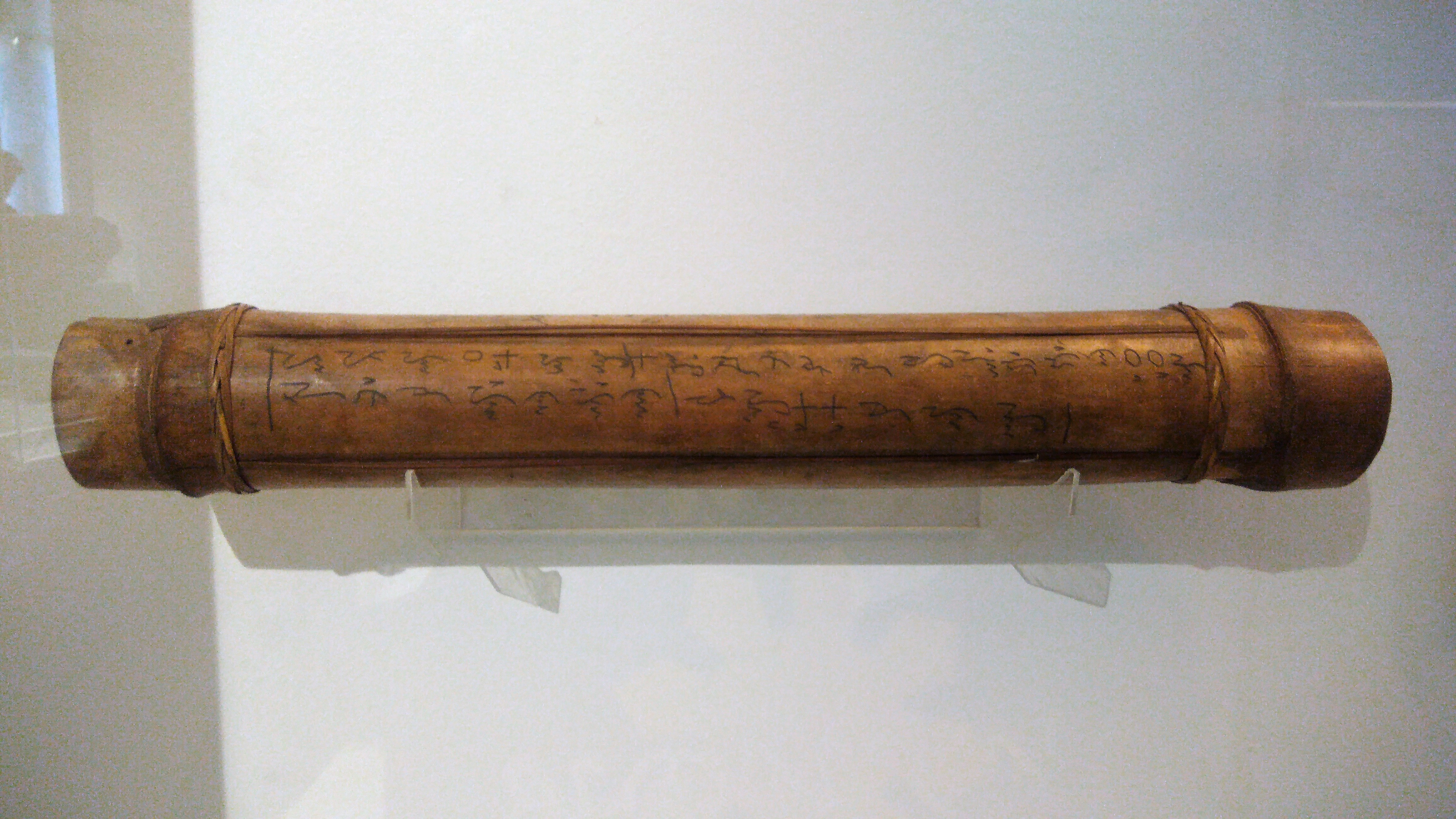
Philippines. Tagbanua instrument with Tagbanua characters.

=== Percussion ===
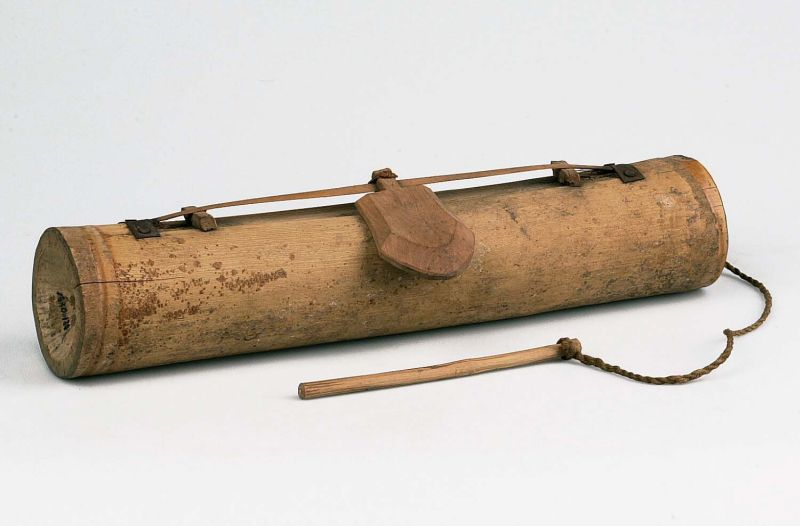
Bali, Indonesia. Guntang or Gintang, one-string percussion zither, also an idiochorde bamboo-tube zither, a rhythm-piercing percussion instrument in Balinese music, adopted in the music of Lombok.

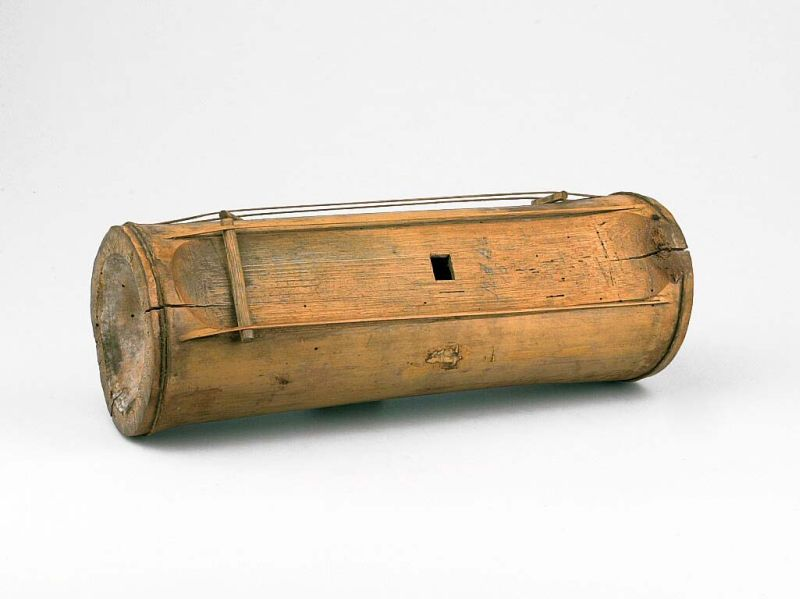
Indonesia, Maluku Utara, Sula Islands Regency. Tuba auyota parallel-string percussion zither from the Sula culture. The strings are played in pairs. This instrument has 2 pairs of strings.

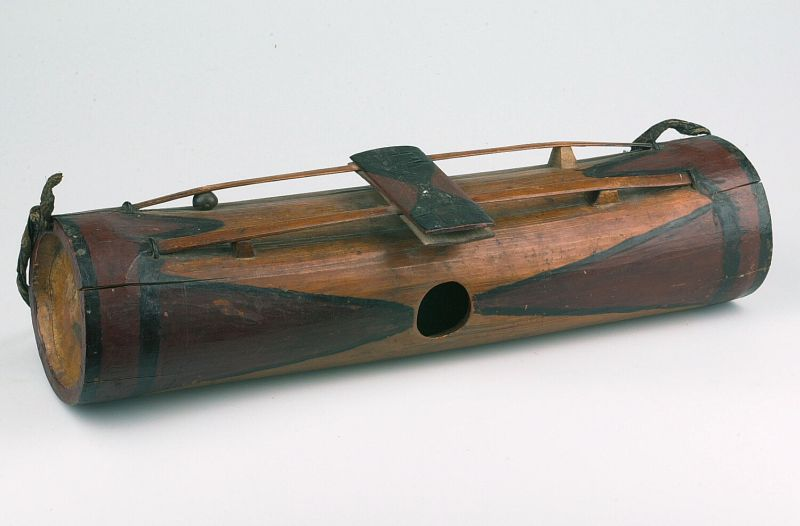
Java, Indonesia. Kendang awi percussion tube-zither pre-1900 with the drum "kendang" as part of its name. Parallel-string percussion zither. The strings are played in pairs, struck on the connector between strings. This was part of an orchestra with anklungs.

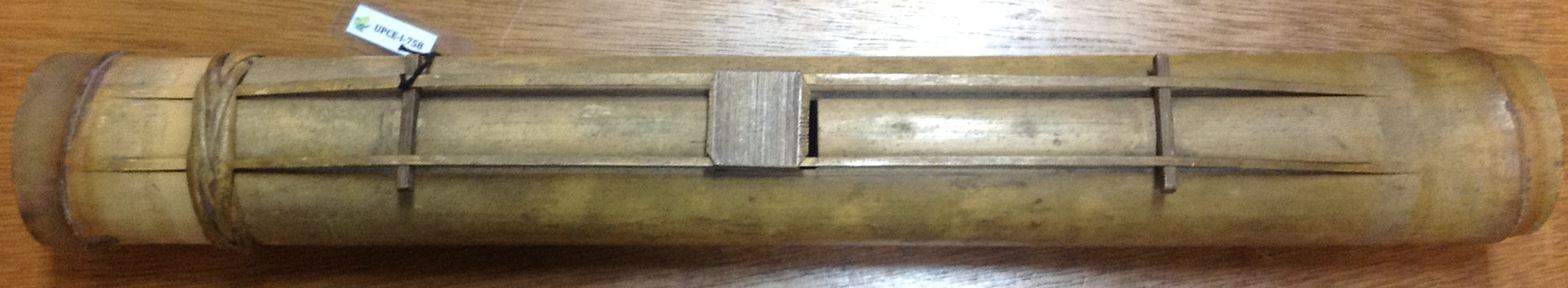
Philippines. Takumbo percussion tube-zither. May also be plucked.

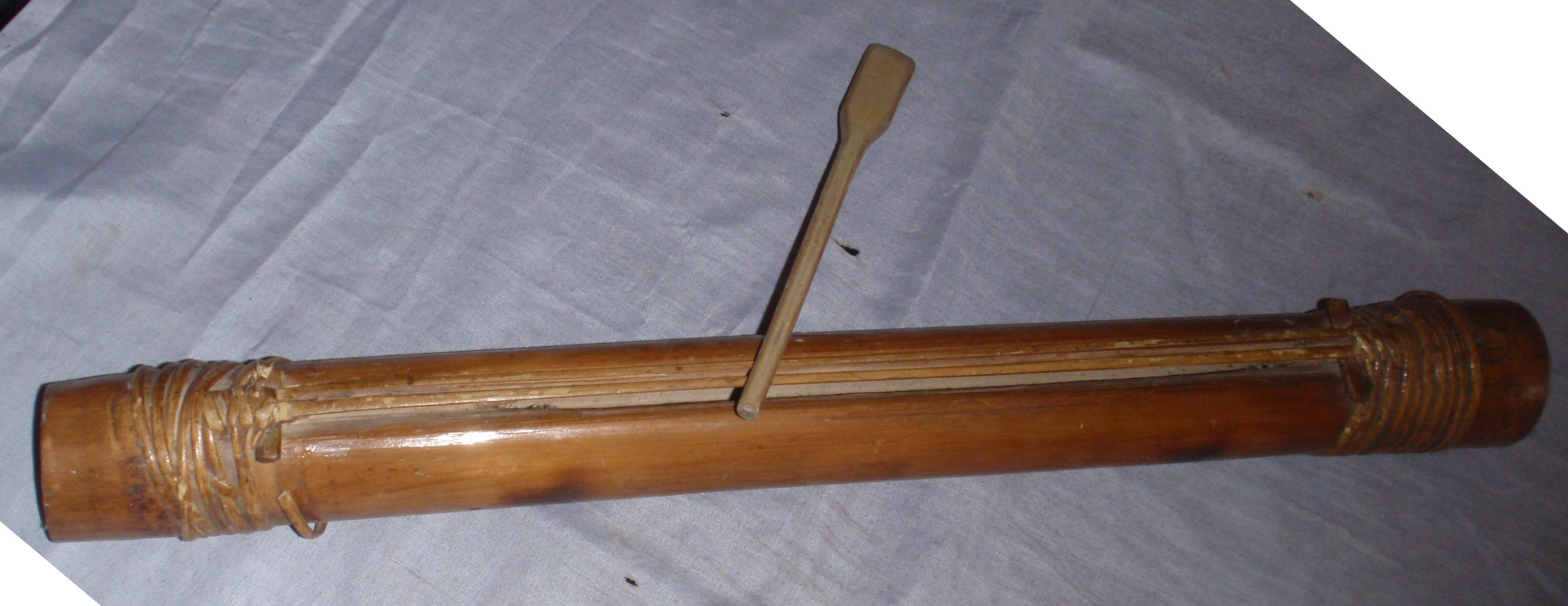
Dhutang, percussion tube zither from Assam, India
