= Dinki Mini =

Jamaican dance

Dinki Mini is a dance and funerary rite from Jamaica. It is mostly performed in the parishes of Saint Andrew, Saint Mary and Saint Ann.
