= Đàn goong =

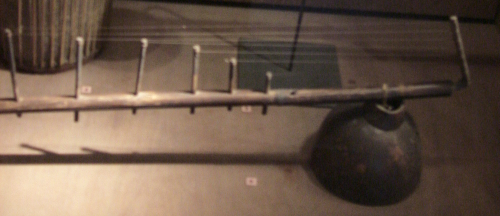
Đàn goong

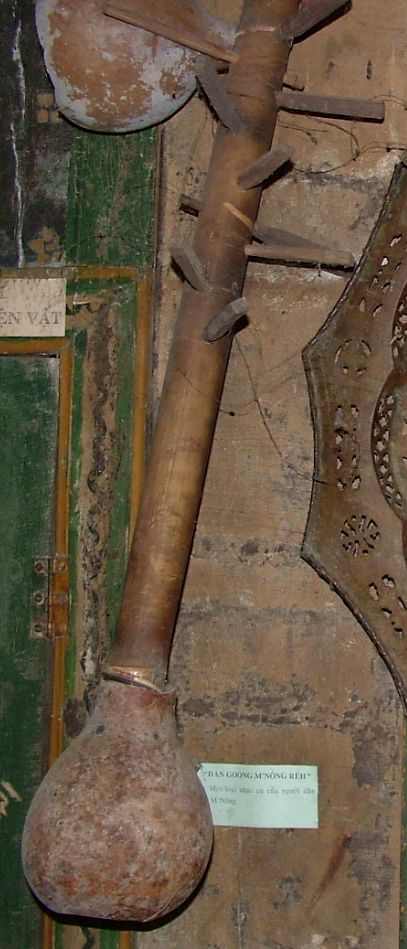
Tube zither called a Đàn goong in Vietnam.

The goong or đàn goong is a plucked fretted tube zither with gourd resonator used by several ethnic minority groups in Vietnam's Central Highlands. It is similar to the valiha of Madagascar.
