= Krem (instrument) =

The krem is a musical instrument, a type of bamboo tube zither played by the Jah Hut group of the Orang Asli tribal peoples of Malaysia.

The instrument is made of a bamboo tube, open at one end and with some slits for sound-holes; it has two strings, previously made of roots but now often nylon. The root strings were once coated with resin to produce a "loud, firm sound." The instrument may be plucked or bowed, and is mainly played by women.

== See also ==
- Pergam, another bamboo zither, but idiochord, played by the Jah Hut people
