= Benta (instrument) =

The benta is a large one-string bamboo zither native to Jamaica. The instrument is an idiochord in that the instrument string is made from the same piece of bamboo that composes the body. The instrument is played by two men sitting astride it at either end, one striking the string and the other changing the pitch of the string by using a gourd-like guitar slide.

The instrument is primarily used to accompany Dinki Mini mourning ceremonies in Saint Mary Parish and Portland Parish.

== See also ==
- Diddley bow, a similar slide-monochord in the United States
