= Kong mong =

Musical instrument

The Kong Mong or Kong Ming (Khmer: គងម៉ង់) is a Cambodian circular musical instrument. It is a single suspended and handheld gong-chime made of bronze or brass, held aloft with one hand, while the other beats it with the wooden mallet, "Onlung Kbal Sva". The gong has two holes drilled in it, with string passing through the holes to suspend it. It has a "boss", a raised and rounded section in the center, called the "Doh". The name comes from the sound that gong-chime produces when beaten: "Mong Mong". It is also described as a "bossed gong".
