= Kulibit =

Philippine tube zither

The kulibit is a type of tube zither played by the Kalinga people of the Philippines. The instrument consists of a long tube of bamboo which has been slit to allow five or six strands of the bamboo husk to be played as "strings".

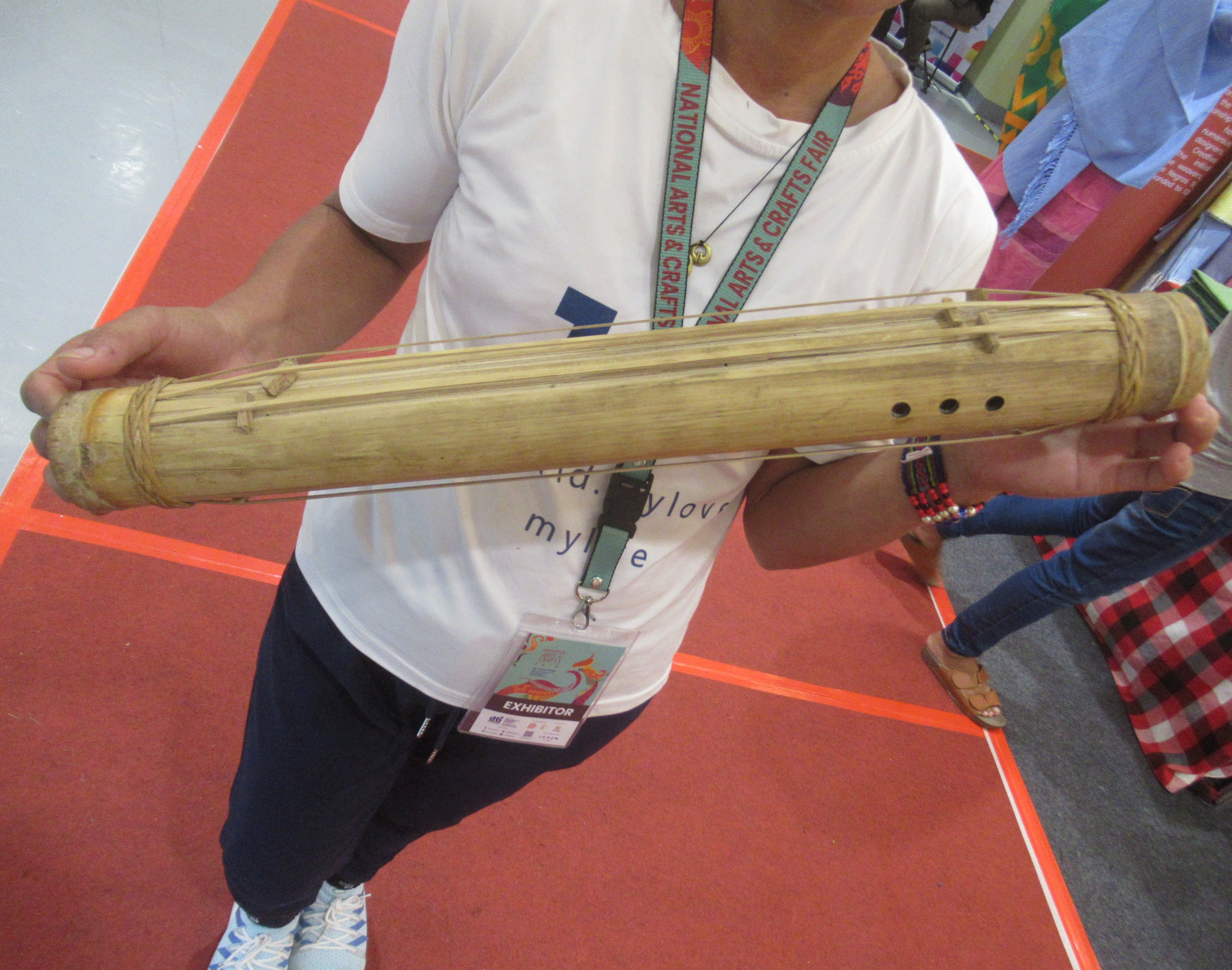
Kulibet played by Tinglayan, Kalinga people

The instrument is also played by the Bontoc and Tinguian people who call it the kollitong, and the Manobo and Tiruray people, who call it the saluray, togo, or takumbu.

These types of instruments, in which a portion of the body of the instrument serves as a strings, are referred to as idiochords. A similar instrument is found in Madagascar, the valiha, though modern valihas may use separate metal or plastic strings.

== See also ==
- Kolitong
