= Cornstalk fiddle =

Rudimentary folk instrument fashioned from a cornstalk

The cornstalk fiddle is a folk instrument, a type of bowed string instrument played historically in North America. The instrument consists of a cornstalk, with slits cut into the shaft to allow one or more fibrous sections to separate from the main body and serve as "strings." Pieces of wood or other material are wedged under the strings before they rejoin the body to serve as a nut and bridge.

The fiddle can be bowed with a bow made from another cornstalk, made from a shoelace or other piece of string, or with a standard violin bow. The instrument is attested as far back as pre-revolutionary war America, when the British soldiers used the song "Yankee Doodle" to taunt the shabby militiamen of the colonies. The verse which includes the reference to cornstalk fiddles reads: "And then they'd fife away like fun and play on cornstalk fiddles, and some had ribbons red as blood all bound around their middles."

Similar instruments are played in Serbia and Hungary, known as the gingara or dječje guslice and cirokhegedű or kucoricahegedű, respectively.

== Construction ==
Each fiddle uses three sections of stalk, and each bow two. The fiddle contains two strings which are constructed by slitting the section between the two joints so that thin slivers can be raised from the stalk by means of two bridges. The bow used to play the fiddle only contains one string crafted the same way as the fiddle's strings.

The tones or pitches of the instrument are produced by the way the musician drags the bow across the strings. Although the instruments were really toys, differences in the tension, width, and length of the strings enable the instrument to play two distinct tones, "soft and scraping", when the strings were wet with water.

== Cultural references ==
- Some folksongs such as "Cotton Eye Joe", refer to a "cornstalk fiddle and a shoestring bow".
- Paul Laurence Dunbar's poem The Corn-Stalk Fiddle describes the construction of the fiddle and playing it at a square dance.
- Heye Rademacher of Auburn, Nebraska, was mentioned in an article in The Journal of American Folklore as saying they were only used as toys and one typically did not attempt to play tunes on them.
