= Idiochord =

An idiochord (Latin: idio – "self", chord – "string", also known as a drum zither) is a musical instrument in which the "string" of the instrument is made from the same material as its resonating body. Such instruments may be found in the Indian Ocean region, disparate regions of Africa and its diaspora, and parts of Europe and North America.

Bamboo is often a popular material for idiochords: a tube of bamboo may be slit to loosen portions of the husk at the middle, leaving them attached at the ends, and these "strings" may be raised up by inserting sticks to serve as bridges. Such bamboo idiochords include the valiha of Madagascar, the kulibit in the Philippines and Indonesia, and the karaniing of the Mon-Khmer "Orang Asli" tribal peoples of Malaysia. A massive one-string bamboo idiochord, the benta, is native to Jamaica and played with a slide, much like a diddly-bow.

Idiochords are also made from other materials; cornstalk was used in North America to make the cornstalk fiddle, and the same instrument was played in the Carpathians, and in Serbia as the gingara or djefje guslice. In Eastern New Guinea, one-string idiochords are made from the rib of the sago palm. The Warao people of Venezuela and Guyana create a monochord idiochord by raising up a fiber from an eta leaf.

Various idiochords are found in mainland Africa, including the akadingidi of Uganda, and the one-string mpeli of the Mpyeme people of Congo and the Central African Republic.

== See also ==
- tube zither
