= Karaniing =

Malaysian musical instrument

The karaniing (or kereb among the Temiar people or Senoi people, or pergram among the Jah Hut people) is a type of bamboo tube zither played among the Orang Asli tribal peoples of Malaysia.

The pergam variant is made with four strings (in two pairs) cut from the bamboo itself, making this instrument an idiochord. The strings are tuned in intervals of a minor third and often played for ceremonial purposes.

A variant zither called the krem is also played by the Jah Hut people, but is heterochord (strings made of a separate material) vice idiochord. Though the term krem may also be used for the karaniing by the Senoi.
