= Valiha =

Stringed musical instrument

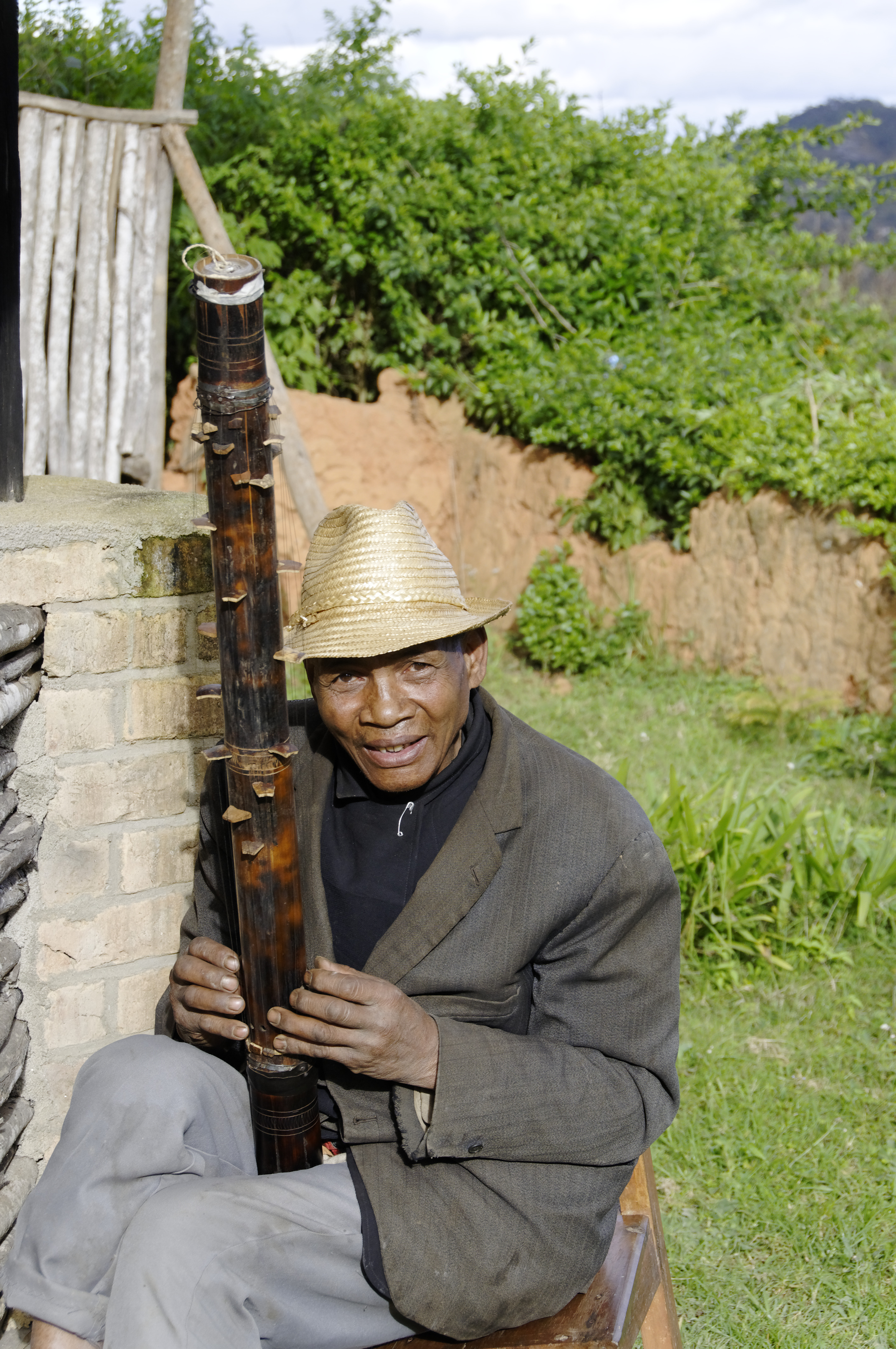
A valiha player in Ambohimahasoa, central Madagascar

Lullaby played on valiha

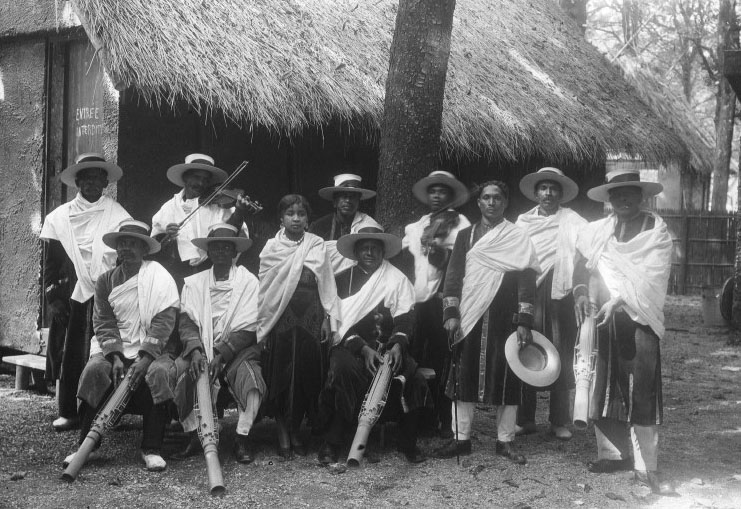
Valiha orchestra at the Paris World Exposition of 1931

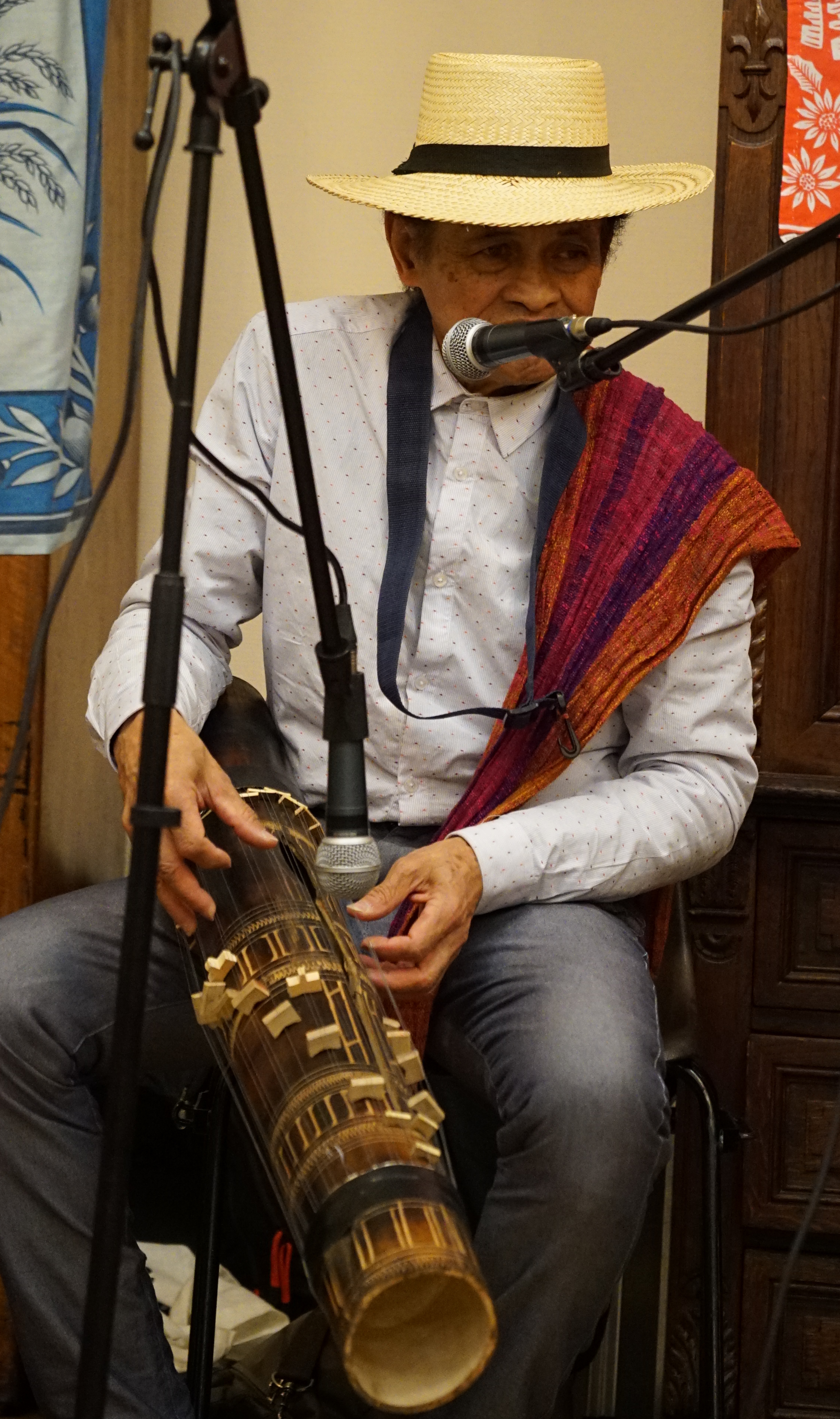
Valiha with larger diameter bamboo tube

The valiha is a tube zither from Madagascar made from a species of local bamboo; it is considered the "national instrument" of Madagascar. The term is also used to describe a number of related zithers of differing shapes and materials.

The instrument has been held in high regard among the Malagasy particularly in the Merina rule over the island that having long fingernails ideal for plucking its strings were marks "distinguishing the aristocracy from the labourers". Aside from recreational music, the valiha is also used for ritual music to summon spirits.

It is commonly thought in Madagascar that the valiha is "inherited from King David", as part of a larger origin narrative of Jewish provenance of Malagasy people.

== Construction ==
Historically the instrument was made of the bamboo Valiha diffusa, but in the modern day "bamboo species with longer internodes" are used. The bamboo poles used for building the valiha are chosen between diameters of 5 to 10 cm and preferably cut within a length of 35 to 180 cm.

The valiha generally has 21-24 strings. Historically these were formed of strips of the bamboo body, prised up and raised by small calabash or wooden bridges that also act as movable tuners, but in the modern day the strings are often made of unwound bicycle brake cable tied through nails, though serious players may use standard guitar or piano strings used for churches and folk bands.

A variant instrument, the marovany, is similar in concept but boxlike rather than tubular, and made of wood or sheet metal.

== Players ==
One of the most celebrated valiha players of the twentieth century is Rakotozafy (c. 1933 - c. 1974). The majority of Rakotozafy's few recorded performances were made live at the central studio of Malagasy Radio. Sylvestre Randafison is another celebrated valiha artist considered a cultural icon in Madagascar.

== See also ==
- Music of Madagascar
- Ukulele

== Bibliography ==
- Adams, Rashid Epstein. "The Making of a National Instrument: Imagery, Symbolism and the Social Function of the Malagasy Valiha", Music in Art: International Journal for Music Iconography XLIII/1-2 (2018), 141–157.
