= Kalinga Provincial Board =

Legislative body of the province of Kalinga, Philippines

Kalinga Provincial Board Sangguniang Panlalawigan ng Kalinga

Type
- Type: Unicameral
- Term limits: 3 terms (9 years)

Leadership
- Presiding Officer: Dave Odiem, PFP since June 30, 2025

Structure
- Seats: 12 board members 1 ex officio presiding officer
- Political groups: Nacionalista (2) NPC (2) Lakas (2) KBL (1) Independent (2) Nonpartisan (3)
- Length of term: 3 years
- Authority: Local Government Code of the Philippines

Elections
- Voting system: Multiple non-transferable vote (regular members); Indirect election (ex officio members); Acclamation (sectoral member)
- Last election: May 12, 2025
- Next election: May 15, 2028

Meeting place
- Kalinga Provincial Capitol, Tabuk

The Kalinga Provincial Board is the Sangguniang Panlalawigan (provincial legislature) of the Philippine province of Kalinga.

The members are elected via plurality-at-large voting: the province is divided into two districts, each having four seats. A voter votes up to four names, with the top four candidates per district being elected. The vice governor is the ex officio presiding officer, and only votes to break ties. The vice governor is elected via the plurality voting system province-wide.

Aside from the regular members, the board also includes the provincial federation presidents of the Liga ng mga Barangay (ABC, from its old name "Association of Barangay Captains"), the Sangguniang Kabataan (SK, youth councils) and the Philippine Councilors League (PCL). Kalinga's provincial board also has a reserved seat for its indigenous people (IPMR).

== Apportionment ==
The districts used in appropriation of members is not coextensive with the legislative district of Kalinga; unlike congressional representation which is at-large, Kalinga is divided into two districts for representation in the Sangguniang Panlalawigan.

The first district includes the northern and western side of the province, comprising the municipalities of Balbalan, Lubuagan, Pasil, Pinukpuk, and Tinglayan. The second district encompasses the capital, Tabuk City, as well as the municipalities of Rizal and Tanudan.

In 2025, the second district gained 2 additional seats after the Department of Finance upgraded the province's income classification to 2nd class, from 3rd class.

Elections	Seats per district		Ex officio seats	Reserved seats	Total seats
Elections	1st	2nd	Ex officio seats	Reserved seats	Total seats
2010–2025	4	4	3	1	12
2025–present	4	6	3	1	14

== List of members ==
=== Current members ===
These are the members after the 2025 local elections and 2023 barangay and SK elections:

- Vice Governor: Dave Odiem (PFP)

Seat	Board member	Party	Start of term	End of term
1st district	Jay Harley B. Daguiang	Aksyon	June 30, 2022	June 30, 2028
1st district	Romeo Saclag	Independent	June 30, 2025	June 30, 2028
1st district	Emilio T. Kitongan	Nacionalista	June 30, 2025	June 30, 2028
1st district	Roger Saga-oc	Nacionalista	June 30, 2019	June 30, 2028
2nd district	Julius B. Amla	Nacionalista	June 30, 2022	June 30, 2028
2nd district	Chester A. Alunday	Nacionalista	June 30, 2025	June 30, 2028
2nd district	Alfredo K. Dangani	Independent	June 30, 2025	June 30, 2028
2nd district	Bernard Glenn M. Dao-as	NPC	June 30, 2025	June 30, 2028
2nd district	Christopher D. Donaal	Liberal	June 30, 2025	June 30, 2028
2nd district	Camilo T. Lammawin, Jr.	PFP	June 30, 2025	June 30, 2028
ABC		Nonpartisan		
PCL				
SK		Nonpartisan		
IPMR		Nonpartisan		

=== Vice Governor ===
Election year	Name	Party	Ref.
2016	James Edduba	Lakas	
2019	Dave Oidem	Nacionalista	
2022	Joel C. Baac	Aksyon	
2025	Dave Oidem	PFP	

=== 1st District ===
- Population (2024):

Election year	Member (party)	Member (party)	Member (party)	Member (party)	Ref.
2016	Shirlynne Dasayon (Lakas)	Denzel Michael Langkit (Liberal)	Dave Oidem (Liberal)	Emilio T. Kitongan (Nacionalista)	
2019	Shirlynne Dasayon (Lakas)	Christian Pic-It (Nacionalista)	Roger P. Saga-oc (Independent)	Emilio T. Kitongan (Nacionalista)	
2022	Shirlynne Dasayon (Nacionalista)	Denzel Michael Langkit (Reporma)	Roger P. Saga-oc (PDP–Laban)	Jay Harley B. Daguiang (Aksyon)	
2025	Romeo Saclag (Independent)	Emilio T. Kitongan (Nacionalista)	Roger P. Saga-oc (Nacionalista)	Jay Harley B. Daguiang (Aksyon)	

=== 2nd District ===
- Population (2024):

Election year	Member (party)	Member (party)	Member (party)	Ref.
2016	Frederick Pangsiw (KBL)	Lester Lee Tarnate (NPC)	—	
2016	Rhustom Dagadag (Liberal)	Eduardo Sarol (NPC)	—	
2019	Frederick Pangsiw (KBL)	Mark Aldrich Diasen (NPC)	—	
2019	Antonio Bakilan (Independent)	Lester Lee Tarnate (NPC)	—	
2022	Julius B. Amla (Nacionalista)	Mark Aldrich Diasen (PDP–Laban)	—	
2022	Antonio Bakilan (PDP–Laban)	Lester Lee Tarnate (PDP–Laban)	—	
2025	Julius B. Amla (Nacionalista)	Chester A. Alunday (Nacionalista)	Camilo T. Lamamwin, Jr. (PFP)	
2025	Christopher D. Donaal (Liberal)	Alfredo K. Dangani (Independent)	Bernard Glenn M. Dao-as (NPC)	
