= List of barangays in Kalinga =

The province of Kalinga has 153 barangays comprising its 7 municipalities and 1 city.

== Barangays ==
Most populous in its respective city/municipality (as of 2010)

Barangay	Population					City or municipality
Barangay	2010	2007	2000	1995	1990	City or municipality
Ababa-an	391	438	478	406	353	Balbalan
Ableg	548	572	555	528	525	Pasil
Aciga	753	1,086	1,049	844	735	Pinukpuk
Agbannawag	4,082	3,658	2,950	1,891	1,648	Tabuk
Allaguia	1,607	1,302	1,181	1,234	1,112	Pinukpuk
Ambato Legleg	434	320	341	344	348	Tinglayan
Amlao	682	674	783	645	562	Tabuk
Ammacian	1,526	1,212	1,219	1,121	962	Pinukpuk
Anggacan	320	309	607	582	467	Tanudan
Anggacan Sur	224	311	322	347	302	Tanudan
Antonio Canao	965	1,032	959	1,041	942	Lubuagan
Apatan	1,802	1,931	1,481	1,261	1,099	Pinukpuk
Appas	2,689	2,623	2,311	2,010	1,726	Tabuk
Asibanglan	1,058	1,166	1,068	1,115	932	Pinukpuk
Ba-ay	644	683	785	650	566	Pinukpuk
Babalag East (Poblacion)	1,179	1,026	1,043	1,057	1,048	Rizal (Liwan)
Babalag West (Poblacion)	1,851	1,684	1,623	1,515	1,370	Rizal (Liwan)
Babbanoy	367	355	552	781	642	Tanudan
Bado Dangwa	1,669	1,648	1,305	1,132	986	Tabuk
Bagtayan	412	430	417	412	364	Pasil
Bagumbayan	729	713	625	446	540	Tabuk
Balantoy	1,455	1,404	1,361	1,365	1,185	Balbalan
Balatoc	1,442	1,463	1,408	1,454	1,200	Pasil
Balawag	1,517	1,279	1,188	1,016	848	Tabuk
Balbalan Proper	1,016	892	851	809	778	Balbalan
Balbalasang	923	871	884	963	828	Balbalan
Balenciagao Sur	439	458	387	419	331	Pasil
Balinciagao Norte	855	850	757	692	597	Pasil
Ballayangon	1,458	1,277	1,193	1,041	907	Pinukpuk
Balong	1,680	1,299	1,230	874	756	Tabuk
Bangad Centro	610	601	676	681	527	Tinglayan
Bantay	1,015	924	965	738	645	Tabuk
Basao	1,196	1,236	1,139	1,178	430	Tinglayan
Bayao	1,826	1,838	1,532	1,390	1,177	Pinukpuk
Belong Manubal	469	432	448	443	477	Tinglayan
Buaya	779	835	887	890	661	Balbalan
Bugnay	992	917	936	853	883	Tinglayan
Bulanao	15,948	12,329	18,573	14,157	12,340	Tabuk
Bulanao Norte	6,359	4,856	–	–	–	Tabuk
Bulbol	750	631	589	406	354	Rizal (Liwan)
Bulo	5,057	3,223	2,916	2,108	1,837	Tabuk
Buscalan (Buscalan-Locong)	703	640	592	604	1,140	Tinglayan
Butbut (Butbut-Ngibat)	580	481	867	688	540	Tinglayan
Cabaritan	915	794	883	771	731	Tabuk
Cabaruan	1,729	1,733	1,658	1,394	1,215	Tabuk
Cagaluan	1,218	1,206	1,205	919	801	Pasil
Calaccad	1,339	1,382	1,233	1,179	1,185	Tabuk
Calanan	1,423	1,279	870	675	660	Tabuk
Calaocan	1,304	1,228	1,326	1,060	1,017	Rizal (Liwan)
Camalog	848	761	795	799	720	Pinukpuk
Casigayan	2,806	2,895	2,829	2,611	2,226	Tabuk
Cawagayan	880	1,013	934	986	828	Pinukpuk
Colayo	367	437	485	507	406	Pasil
Cudal	2,785	2,130	1,766	1,383	1,205	Tabuk
Dacalan	401	369	637	614	535	Tanudan
Dagupan Centro (Poblacion)	3,297	3,312	3,368	3,378	3,096	Tabuk
Dagupan Weste	3,985	3,708	3,103	2,885	2,656	Tabuk
Dalupa	420	511	509	463	424	Pasil
Dananao	719	585	549	582	586	Tinglayan
Dangoy	1,304	1,252	1,246	1,122	1,162	Lubuagan
Dangtalan	664	638	515	556	458	Pasil
Dao-angan	635	662	563	543	478	Balbalan
Dilag	6,226	2,811	2,315	1,467	1,278	Tabuk
Dugpa	1,130	856	824	671	545	Pinukpuk
Dupag	1,154	944	1,025	1,060	851	Tabuk
Dupligan	1,405	1,393	1,388	1,024	836	Tanudan
Gaang	559	433	737	636	571	Tanudan
Galdang (Casaloan)	368	395	381	393	328	Pasil
Gawa-an	1,006	1,017	950	952	898	Balbalan
Gobgob	1,823	1,753	1,656	1,327	1,186	Tabuk
Guilayon	835	697	719	553	538	Tabuk
Guina-ang (Poblacion)	954	916	918	760	652	Pasil
Ipil	2,606	2,691	–	–	–	Tabuk
Katabbogan	1,682	1,576	1,417	1,274	1,154	Pinukpuk
Kinama	762	705	572	482	357	Rizal (Liwan)
Lacnog	3,757	3,797	3,375	2,694	2,347	Tabuk
Lanna	1,082	948	929	791	722	Tabuk
Lay-asan	614	558	368	532	427	Tanudan
Laya East	3,636	2,530	2,827	2,083	1,815	Tabuk
Laya West	2,649	1,910	679	621	553	Tabuk
Limos	843	771	774	726	741	Pinukpuk
Liwan East	1,349	1,254	1,355	1,284	1,119	Rizal (Liwan)
Liwan West	2,490	2,422	2,229	1,936	1,861	Rizal (Liwan)
Loccong	495	497	822	578	–	Tinglayan
Lower Bangad	879	848	997	604	782	Tinglayan
Lower Lubo	632	625	889	1,015	834	Tanudan
Lower Mangali	301	283	404	411	347	Tanudan
Lower Taloctoc	318	415	704	987	808	Tanudan
Lower Uma	641	711	544	545	495	Lubuagan
Lucog	1,374	1,250	1,206	1,048	1,003	Tabuk
Luplupa	521	597	707	694	551	Tinglayan
Mabaca	697	797	856	773	708	Balbalan
Mabaca	801	740	639	711	539	Tanudan
Mabilong	1,327	1,599	1,689	1,553	1,441	Lubuagan
Mabongtot	913	969	966	900	794	Lubuagan
Macutay	1,575	1,537	1,409	1,375	1,236	Rizal (Liwan)
Magaogao	803	717	622	510	441	Pinukpuk
Magnao	1,014	973	1,071	750	1,072	Tabuk
Magsaysay	3,378	3,435	2,547	2,605	2,358	Tabuk
Magsilay	702	797	653	686	579	Pasil
Malagnat	1,690	1,573	1,579	1,222	1,065	Pinukpuk
Malalao	399	385	348	313	221	Tabuk
Malin-awa	1,765	1,668	1,441	1,163	1,102	Tabuk
Maling (Kabugao)	434	397	359	374	345	Balbalan
Mallango	799	759	770	925	742	Tinglayan
Malucsad	535	648	476	488	394	Pasil
Mangali Centro	409	432	547	534	461	Tanudan
Mapaco	852	859	759	714	682	Pinukpuk
Masablang	913	832	732	704	863	Tabuk
Nambaran	3,638	3,428	2,723	2,084	1,937	Tabuk
Nambucayan	988	895	774	490	427	Tabuk
Naneng	690	561	631	442	370	Tabuk
New Tanglag	1,301	1,251	908	785	762	Tabuk
Ngibat	288	248	496	284	382	Tinglayan
Old Tinglayan	306	270	480	655	235	Tinglayan
Pakawit	999	817	815	656	514	Pinukpuk
Pangol	801	746	603	705	566	Tanudan
Pantikian	1,064	1,016	957	966	928	Balbalan
Pinococ	683	642	460	359	313	Pinukpuk
Pinukpuk Junction	2,986	2,589	2,628	2,263	1,942	Pinukpuk
Poblacion	1,550	1,805	1,761	1,869	1,933	Lubuagan
Poblacion	485	334	520	516	450	Tanudan
Poblacion	833	865	804	903	762	Tinglayan
Poblacion (Salegseg)	1,195	1,258	1,181	1,152	983	Balbalan
Poswoy	968	1,100	1,093	1,039	671	Balbalan
Pugong	702	763	694	658	513	Pasil
Romualdez	594	529	385	312	208	Rizal (Liwan)
San Francisco	482	449	356	275	265	Rizal (Liwan)
San Juan	2,115	1,996	1,497	930	810	Tabuk
San Julian	1,184	950	874	743	837	Tabuk
San Pascual	1,190	1,064	976	982	802	Rizal (Liwan)
San Pedro	497	375	300	297	242	Rizal (Liwan)
San Quintin	532	533	574	490	394	Rizal (Liwan)
Santor	1,387	1,177	915	702	612	Rizal (Liwan)
Socbot	1,287	1,355	1,337	1,218	1,032	Pinukpuk
Sumadel 1	551	444	699	905	876	Tinglayan
Sumadel 2	535	498	874	871	871	Tinglayan
Suyang	332	341	415	355	258	Tabuk
Taga (Poblacion)	2,178	2,031	1,907	1,376	1,199	Pinukpuk
Taggay	1,025	975	825	735	713	Pinukpuk
Talalang	628	494	574	545	425	Balbalan
Tanglag	713	681	669	731	639	Lubuagan
Tawang	891	831	940	965	906	Balbalan
Tuga	1,347	1,407	1,385	1,206	1,028	Tabuk
Tulgao East	535	533	961	732	629	Tinglayan
Tulgao West	556	451	450	861	673	Tinglayan
Uma del Norte (Western Luna Uma)	1,138	1,156	1,165	1,214	1,023	Lubuagan
Upper Bangad	556	397	–	–	–	Tinglayan
Upper Lubo	522	429	606	693	604	Tanudan
Upper Taloctoc	370	387	752	1,155	934	Tanudan
Upper Uma	818	978	876	922	760	Lubuagan
Wagud	1,036	753	946	892	723	Pinukpuk
Barangay	2010	2007	2000	1995	1990	City or municipality
*Italicized names are former names.; *Dashes (–) in cells indicate unavailable census data.

[top]
