= Kalinga (province) =

Province in Cordillera, Philippines

- Province
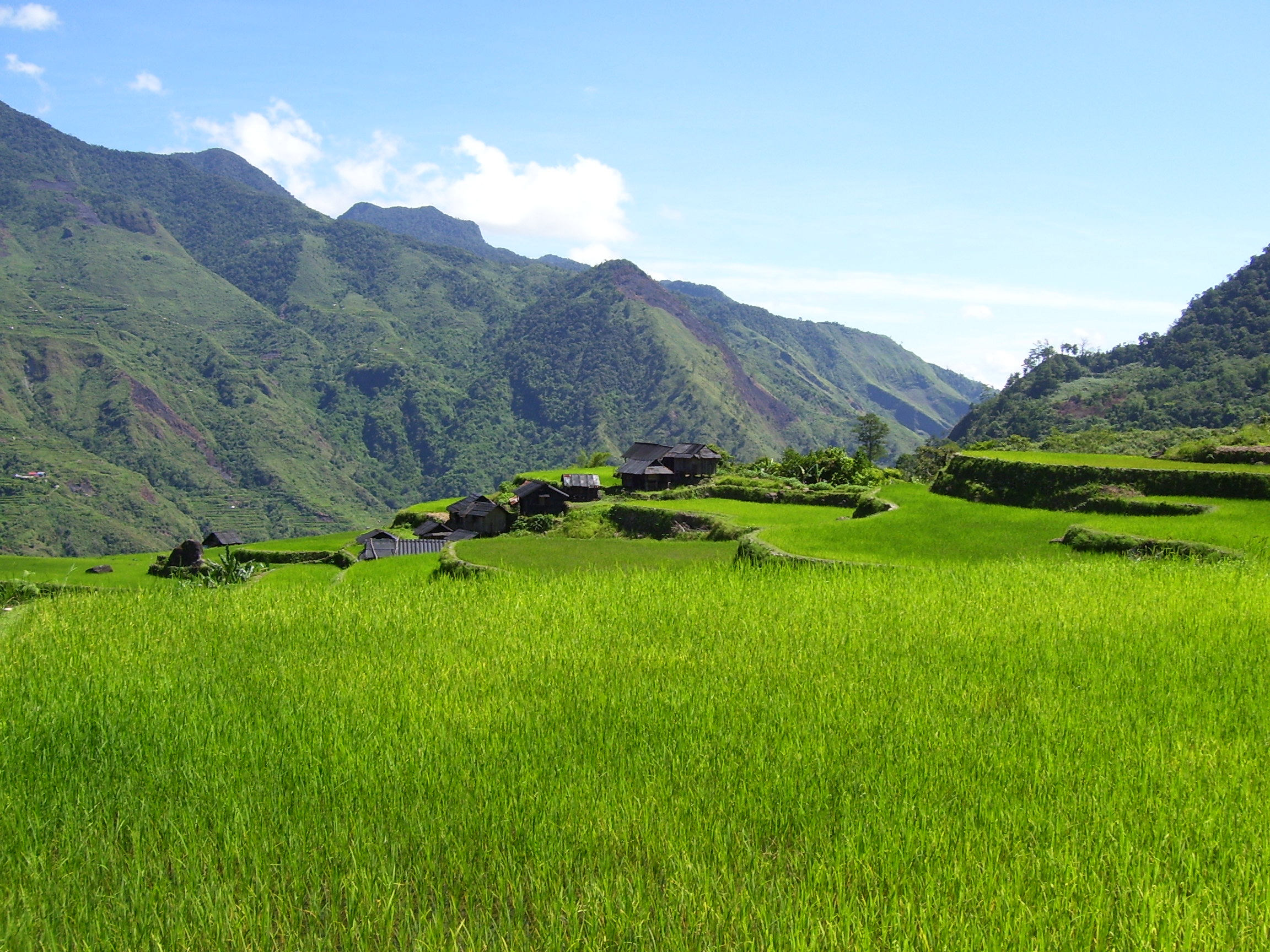
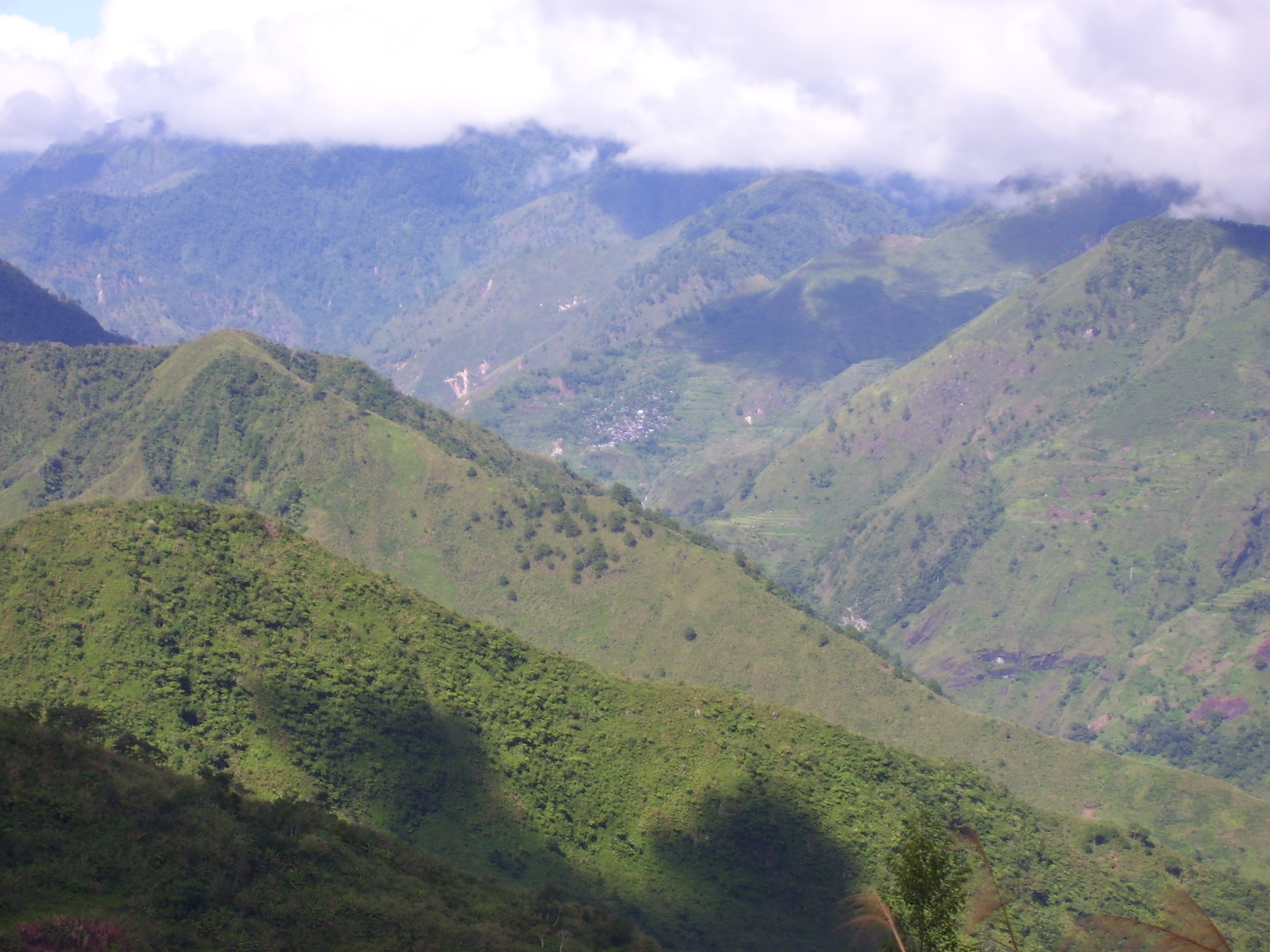
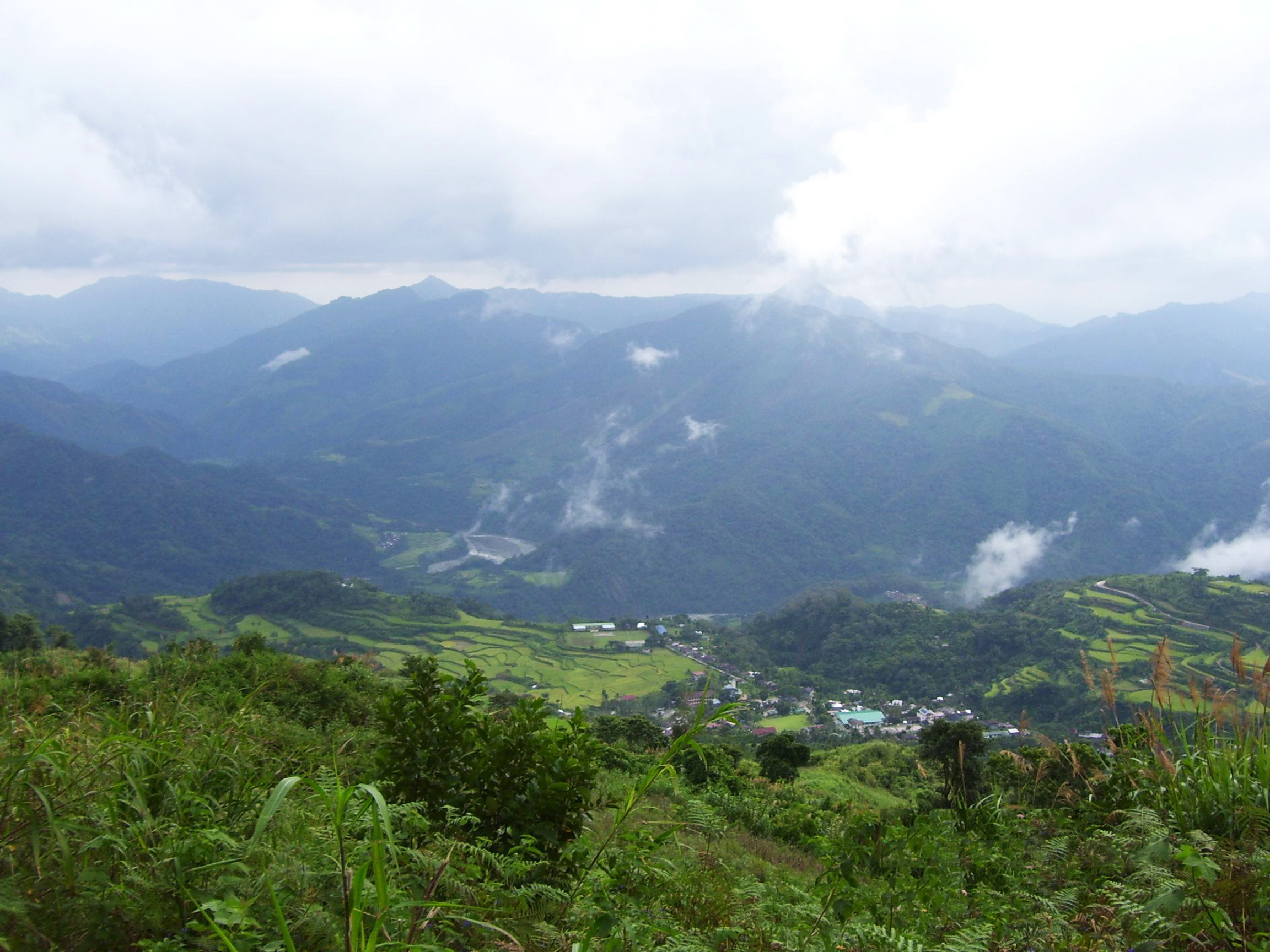
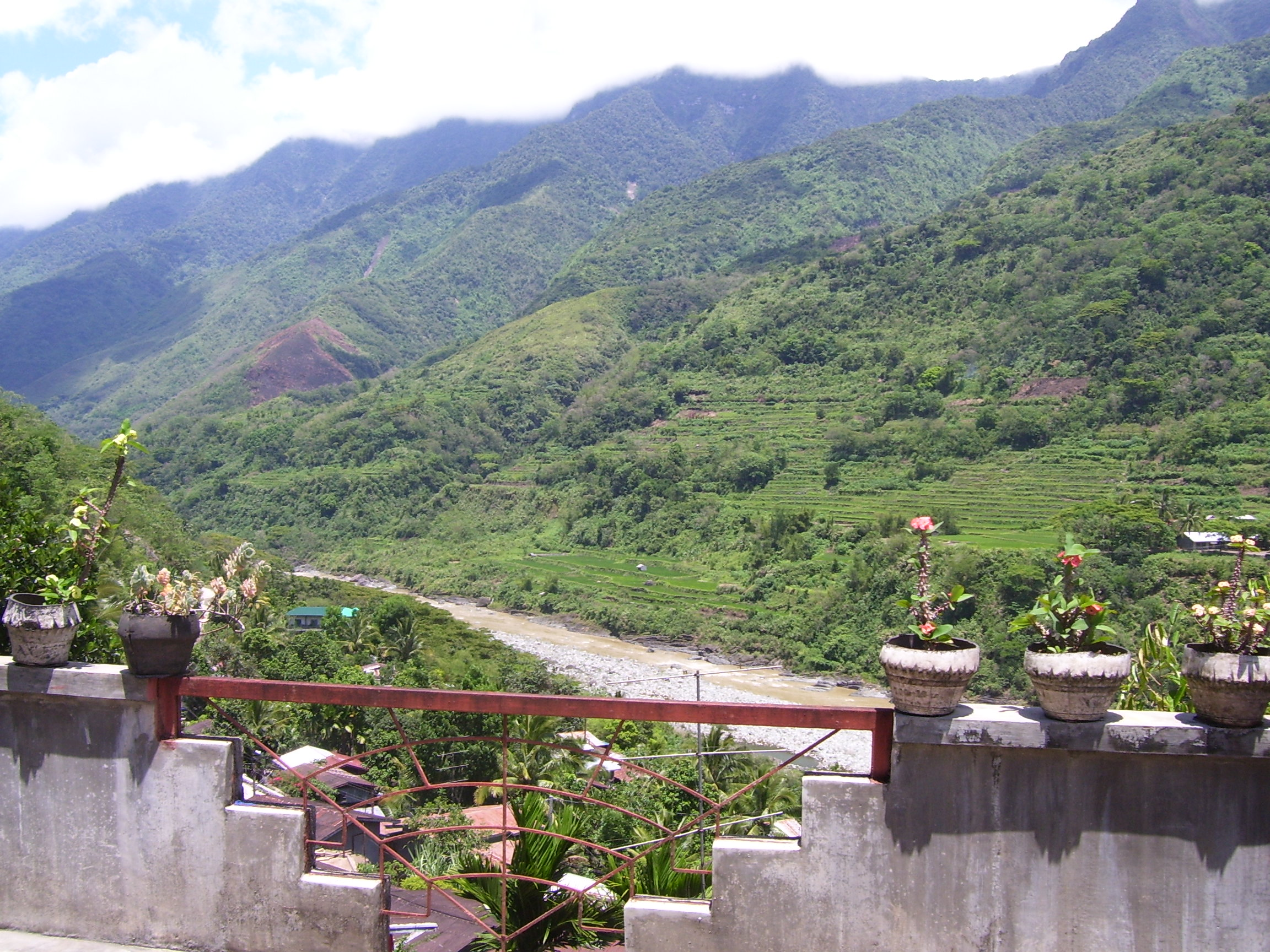
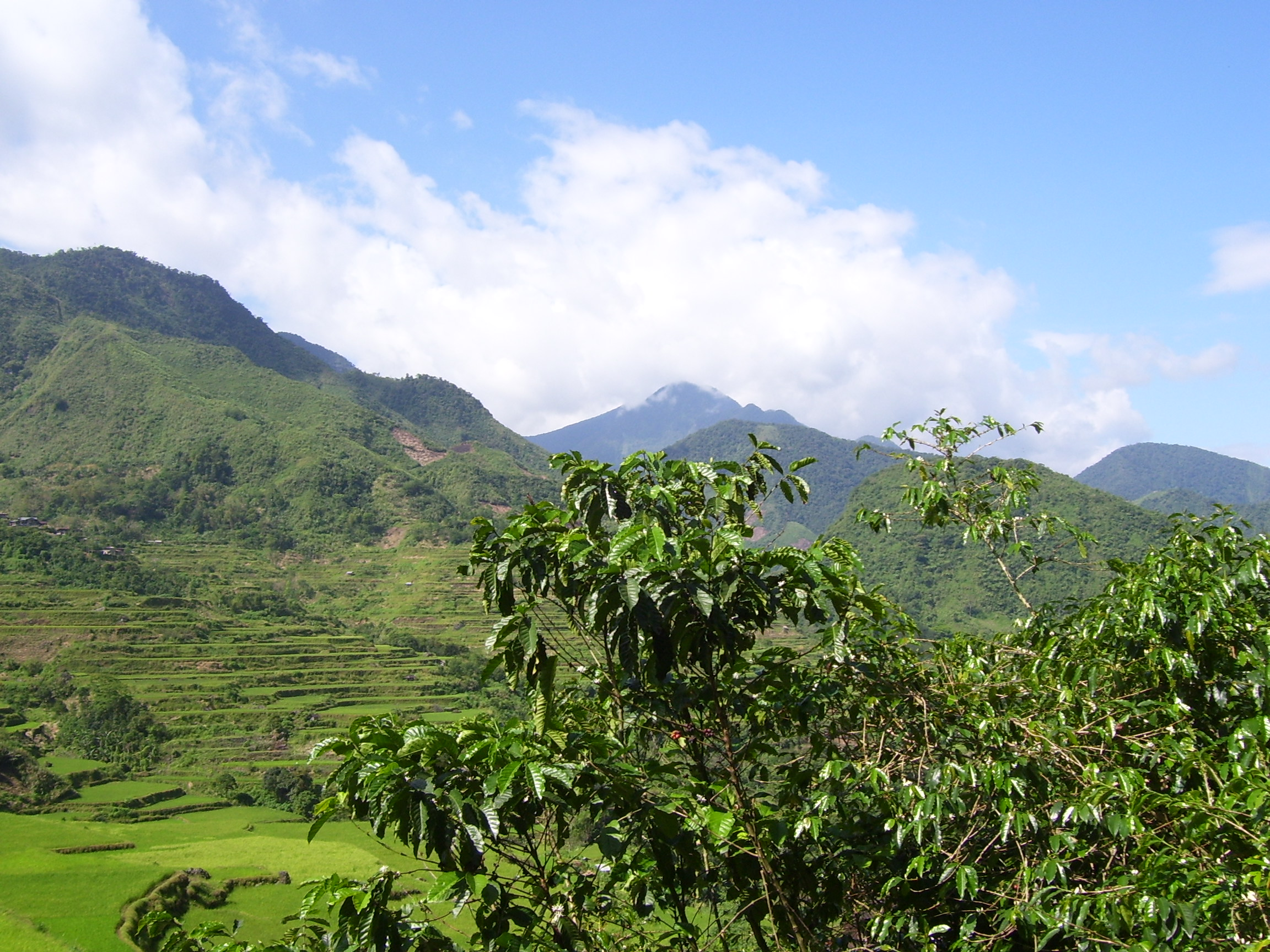
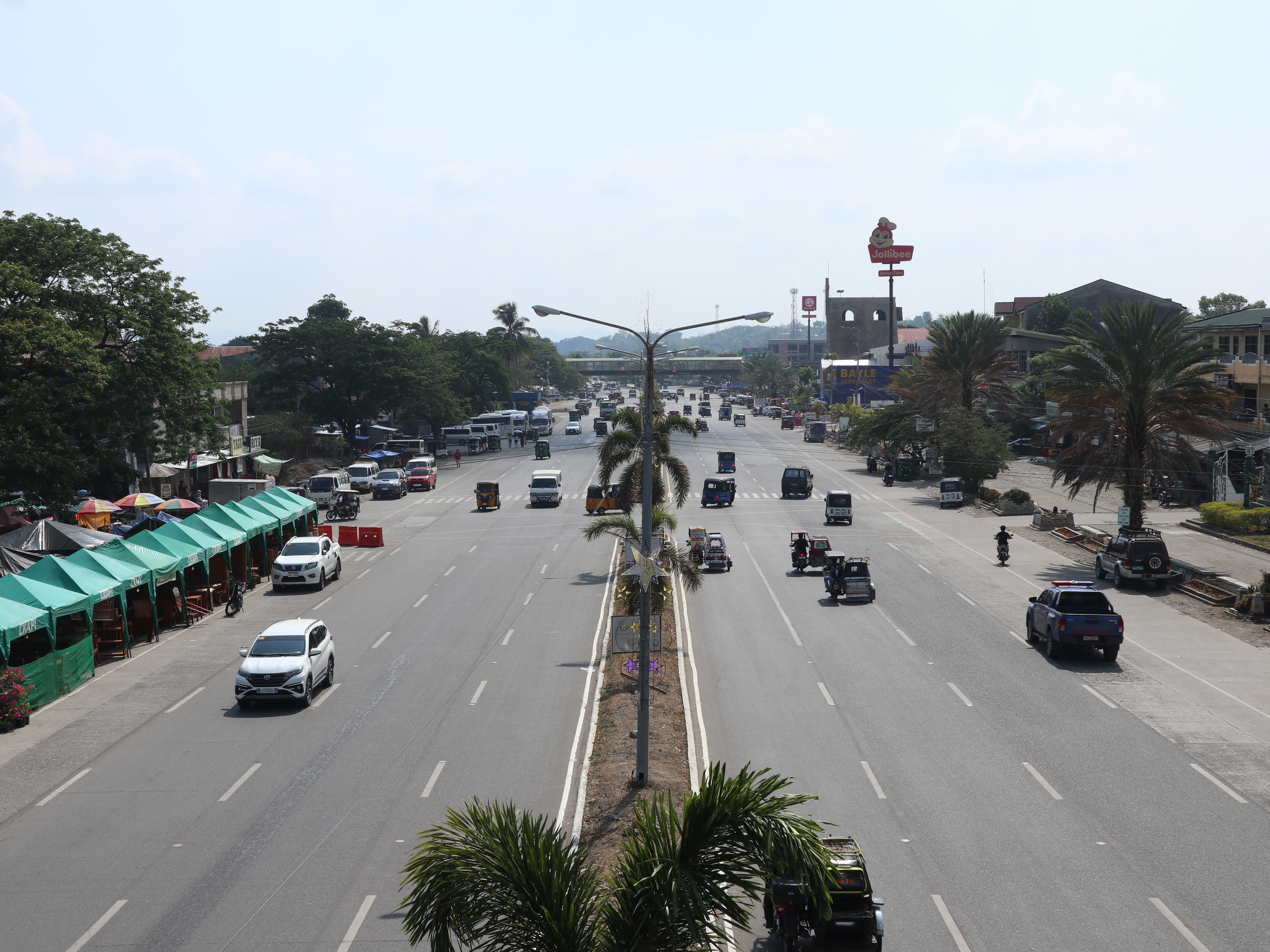
- (from top: left to right) Bum-bag Rice Terraces, Pasil Valley, Lubuagan Mountains, Mount Manting-oy, Mount Binuluan and Bulanao in Tabuk City

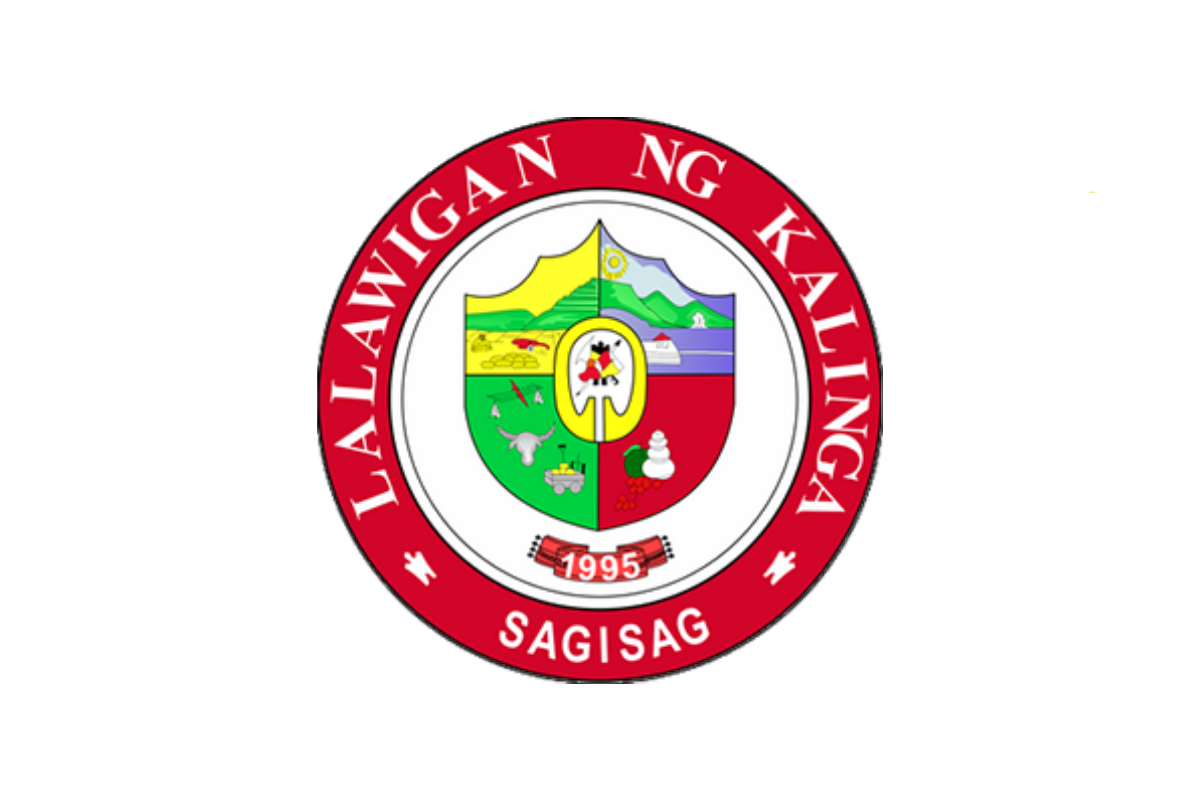
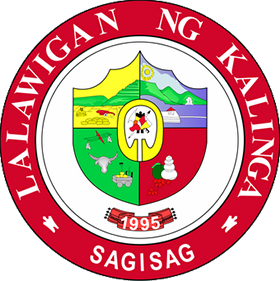
- Flag Seal

- Location in the Philippines
- Interactive map of Kalinga
- Coordinates: 17°26′N 121°17′E
- Country: Philippines
- Region: Cordillera Administrative Region
- Founded: May 8, 1995
- Capital and largest city: Tabuk

Government
  - Governor: James S. Edduba (Lakas)
  - Vice Governor: Jocel C. Baac (Aksyon)
  - Representative: Caroline Agyao
  - Legislature: Kalinga Provincial Board
  - Electorate: 158,555 voters (2025)

Area
  - Total: 3,231.25 km^{2} (1,247.59 sq mi)
  - Rank: 41st out of 82
- Highest elevation (Mount Alchan): 2,617 m (8,586 ft)

Population (2024 census)
  - Total: 235,391
  - Rank: 71st out of 82
  - Density: 72.8483/km^{2} (188.676/sq mi)
  - Rank: 78th out of 82
  - Households: 41,990
- Demonyms: Kalinga; Kalingan

Divisions
  - Independent cities: 0
  - Component cities: 1: Tabuk
  - Municipalities: 7: Balbalan; Lubuagan; Pasil; Pinukpuk; Rizal; Tanudan; Tinglayan
  - Barangays: 153
  - Districts: Legislative district of Kalinga

Economy
  - Income class: 2nd provincial income class
  - Poverty incidence: 2.6% (2023)
  - Revenue: ₱ 1,681 million (2024)
  - Assets: ₱ 5,497 million (2024)
  - Expenditure: ₱ 1,452 million (2024)
  - Liabilities: ₱ 1,430 million (2024)
- Time zone: UTC+8 (PHT)
- PSGC: 1403200000
- IDD : area code: +63 (0)74
- ISO 3166 code: PH-KAL
- Spoken languages: Kalinga; Ilocano; Gaddang; Tagalog; English
- Website: www.kalinga.gov.ph

Kalinga (IPA: [ka'liŋɡa]), officially the Province of Kalinga (Ilocano: Probinsia ti Kalinga; Tagalog: Lalawigan ng Kalinga), is a landlocked province in the Philippines situated within the Cordillera Administrative Region in Luzon. Its capital (and largest city) is Tabuk and borders Mountain Province to the south, Abra to the west, Isabela to the east, Cagayan to the northeast, and Apayao to the north. Kalinga and Apayao are the result of the 1995 partitioning of the former province of Kalinga-Apayao which was seen to better service the respective needs of the various indigenous peoples in the area.

President Emilio Aguinaldo proclaimed Lubuagan town the seat of government for 73 days from March 6, 1900, to May 18, 1900, before finally fleeing to his last hideout in Palanan.

== Etymology ==
The province's name is derived from the Ibanag and Gaddang noun "kalinga", which means "enemy", "fighter", or "headtaker".

== History ==
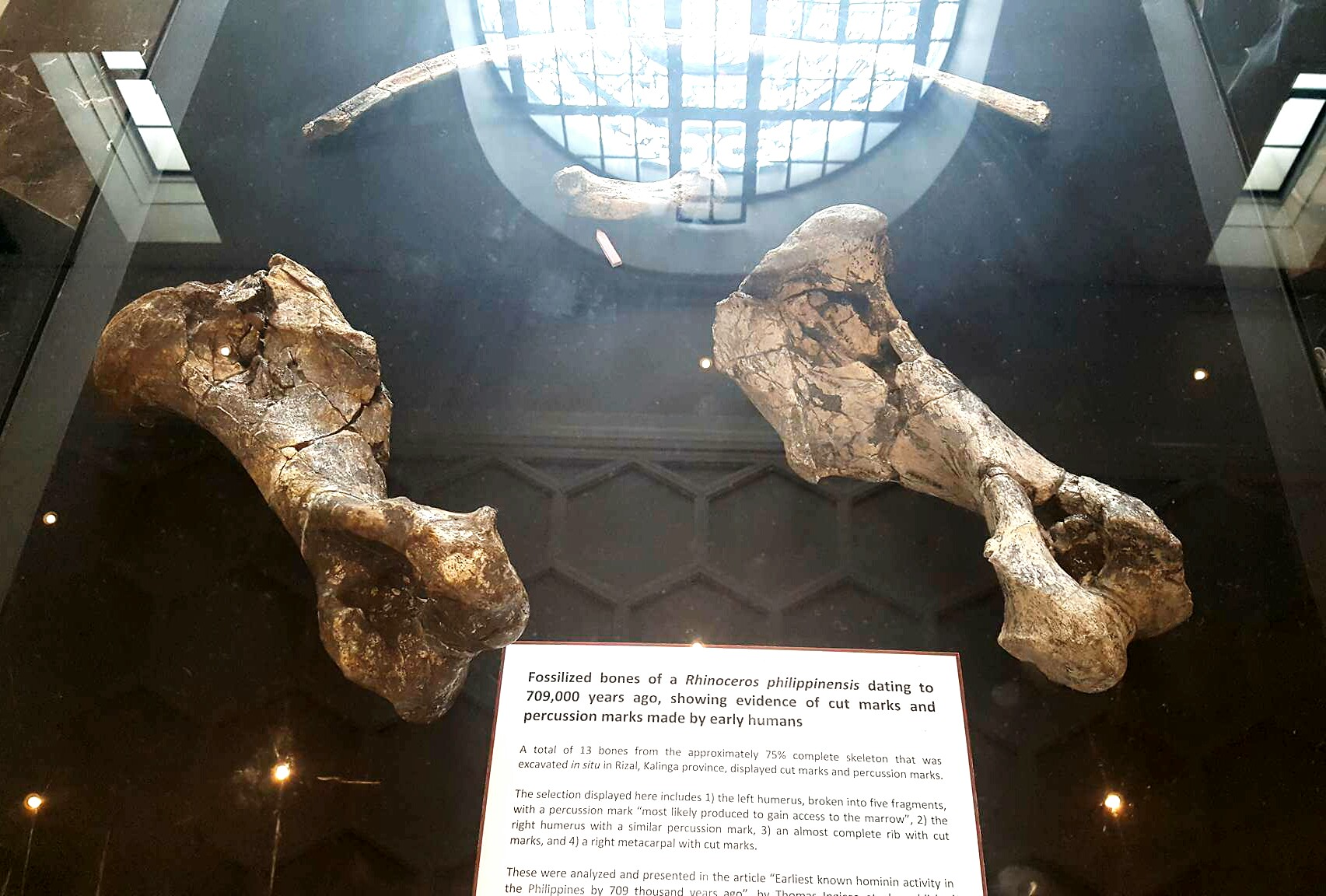
Butchered remains of a Rhinoceros philippinensis found in Rizal, Kalinga. An evidence of early hominins in the Philippines about 709,000 years ago.

=== American occupation ===
Kalinga was taken from Cagayan and Isabela provinces and established by the US Government through Philippine Commission Act No. 1642 on May 9, 1907, as a sub-province of Lepanto-Bontoc.

Kalinga was later organized as one of the sub-provinces of Mountain Province, created by Act No. 1876.

In the early years, the subprovince underwent series of territorial changes. Part of Kalinga was transferred to another sub-province Bontoc through Executive Order No. 53 in 1914. In the municipal district of Pinukpuk, barrios were moved to Balbalan in 1926; as well as parts of it to Conner in Apayao in 1927.

=== Postwar era ===
Kalinga became part of a province along with Apayao when the old Mountain Province was divided into four separate provinces through Republic Act No. 4695 in 1966. Tabuk was designated as the provincial capital.

=== Martial law era ===
The beginning months of the 1970s marked a period of turmoil and change in the Philippines, as well as in Kalinga-Apayao. During his bid to be the first Philippine president to be re-elected for a second term, Ferdinand Marcos launched an unprecedented number of public works projects. This caused the Philippine economy took a sudden downwards turn known as the 1969 Philippine balance of payments crisis, which in turn led to a period of economic difficulty and social unrest.

With only a year left in his last constitutionally allowed term as president Ferdinand Marcos placed the Philippines under Martial Law in September 1972 and thus retained the position for fourteen more years. This period in Philippine history is remembered for the Marcos administration's record of human rights abuses, particularly targeting political opponents, student activists, journalists, religious workers, farmers, and others who fought against the Marcos dictatorship. The Kalinga-Apayao became known as a flashpoint of conflict between the Marcos dictatorship and the various indigenous peoples who lived in the area, because of the Chico River Dam Project, which, even if only the most essential part of it were built, would have encompassed the municipalities of Tinglayan, Lubuagan, Pasil, and parts of Tabuk in Kalinga, as well as numerous municipalities in Mountain Province; and would have displaced about 100,000 indigenous people. Because the great value placed on deceased ancestors who were buried within these communities, the issue was not just one of livelihood, but also one of sacred grounds. Marcos sent three armed brigades to quell down the protests, resulting in heightened tensions in the area. In 1977 alone, numerous Kalinga dam protesters — including tribal leaders Lumbaya Aliga Gayudan and Macli-ing Dulag, and even a 12-year-old child — were rounded up by these forces and incarcerated for up to two months.

The 24 April 1980 murder of Macli-ing Dulag became a turning point when coverage of the murder led to public outrage. It was the first time since the 1972 declaration of Martial Law where the mainstream Philippine press managed to report on the arrests of civilians under Martial Law, and the turn of public opinion against both the Chico River Dam and Martial law, coupled with the united anger of the various peoples of the Cordillera Mountains led the Ferdinand Marcos administration to give up on the dam project. As a result, the Chico River Dam Project is now considered a landmark case study concerning ancestral domain issues in the Philippines.

=== After the People Power Revolution ===
After Marcos' 21 years in power were finally ended by the civilian-led People Power Revolution in 1986, many of the activists who had joined the underground movement decided to "surface," as the new administration of Corazon Aquino released political prisoners and initiated peace talks. However, anti-left sentiment in Aquino's new cabinet, which included figures who were aligned with the Reform the Armed Forces Movement, made the peace process difficult, and negotiations eventually collapsed, and the insurgency in Kalinga-Apayao persisted.

Another event in 1986 marked the beginning of political change in the region, however - the splitting of the Cordillera People's Liberation Army from the New People's Army. Former Catholic priest Conrado Balweg, who had left his calling and joined the NPA in 1979, had been having disagreements with the NPA leadership over tactics and objectives in the Cordillera for four years when he finally decided to split from the NPA in early April 1986, believing that Igorot interests were better served through regional struggles for liberation, rather than the national-scale conflict pursued by the NPA.

=== Peace accord and creation of the Cordillera Autonomous Region ===
In September 1986, the CPLA signed the Mount Data Peace Accord with the government, which led to the creation of what became called the Cordillera Autonomous Region, although attempts to ratify actual autonomy in the region have failed due to non-ratification during plebiscites.

Along with Abra, Kalinga-Apayao became part of the territories in the Cordillera Administrative Region which was created through Executive Order No. 220 in 1987.

=== Creation as a province ===
Kalinga was converted into a province on May 8, 1995 by virtue of RA No. 7878 when a majority of the voters in Kalinga-Apayao approved in a plebiscite the division of the province into two.

=== Contemporary ===
The capital town Tabuk became a component city by virtue of Republic Act No. 9404 which sought to convert the town into a city. The law was ratified on June 23, 2007. However, the cityhood status was lost twice in the years 2008 and 2010 after the League of Cities of the Philippines questioned the validity of the cityhood law. The cityhood status was reaffirmed after the Supreme Court of the Philippines finalized its ruling on February 15, 2011 which declared the cityhood law constitutional.

== Geography ==
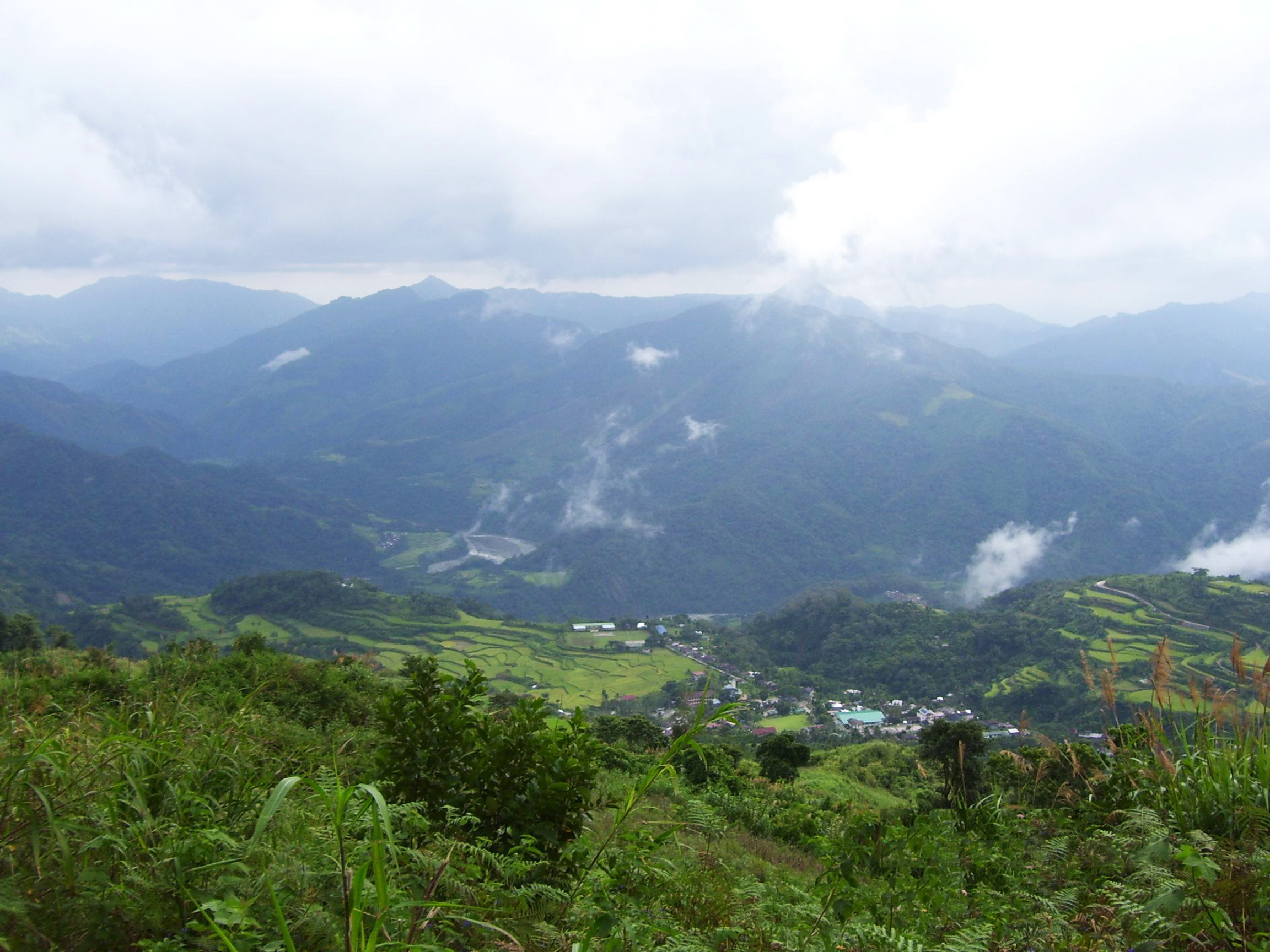
The mountains of Kalinga in Lubuagan

Kalinga covers a total area of 3,231.25 square kilometres (1,247.59 sq mi) occupying the central section of the Cordillera Administrative Region in Luzon. The province is bordered by Mountain Province to the south, Abra to the west, Isabela to the east, Cagayan to the northeast, and Apayao to the north.

Large swaths of the province's lowlands are open grassland suitable for pasture, while the highlands have extensive areas of tropical rainforest. In higher elevations to the west, particularly in the mountains of Balbalan, lie some of the most intact pine forests of Luzon island. Rizal and Tabuk with their flatlands are the biggest rice producers. Next in rice production are the mountainous area, and of note are the rice terraces of Balbalan, Lubuagan, Pasil, Pinukpuk, Tinglayan, and Tanudan.

=== Climate ===
Kalinga features a Type III climate, characterized by a short, dry season from November to April and a relatively long wet season from May to October. Situated within the mountainous Cordillera Administrative Region, the province experiences average temperatures ranging from 17 to 22 degrees Celsius, though some areas can be warmer or cooler depending on altitude. It is prone to significant rainfall, particularly from July to October, with an average annual precipitation in some areas reaching around 1,755 mm.

=== Hydrology ===
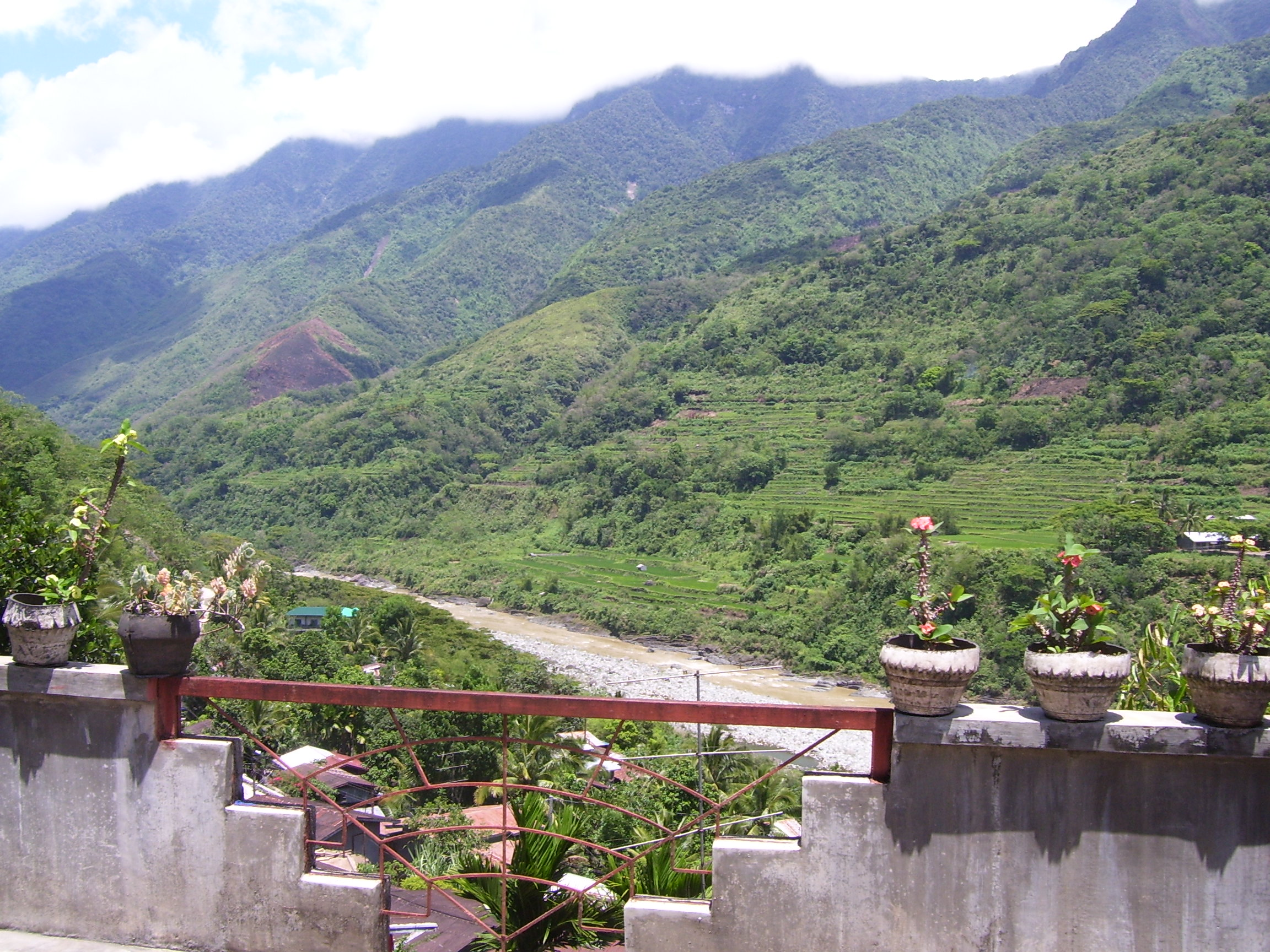
The Chico River passing through Tinglayan

The province is drained mainly by the Chico River, with its headwaters in the Mountain Province and emptying into the Cagayan River. The Chico River has several tributaries: Bunog River in Tinglayan in the south; the Tanudan and Biga Rivers in the east; Pasil River in the central area; and Poswoy, Dao-angan, Mabaca and Saltan Rivers in the west.

Several small lakes can also be found in Kalinga.

=== Administrative divisions ===
Kalinga comprises one component city and seven municipalities, all encompassed by a single legislative district.

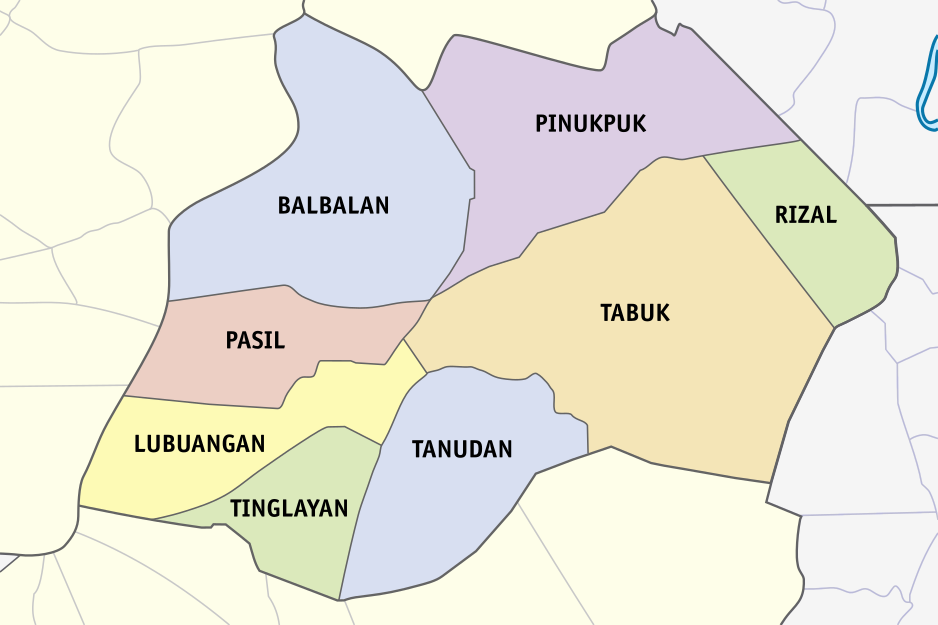
Political divisions of Kalinga

Tabuk was proclaimed a component city in 2007, but in November 2008 the Supreme Court of the Philippines ruled that its cityhood was unconstitutional. However, Tabuk had its city status reinstated by the Supreme Court on December 22, 2009.

City or municipality (Note: The globe icon marks the city/town center.)		Population			±% p.a.	Area		Density		Barangay
		(2020)		(2015)		km^{2}	sq mi	/km^{2}	/sq mi	
Balbalan		5.6%	12,914	12,195	+1.10%	542.69	209.53	24	62	14
Lubuagan		4.1%	9,323	8,733	+1.25%	234.20	90.43	40	100	9
Pasil		4.6%	10,577	9,644	+1.77%	189.00	72.97	56	150	14
Pinukpuk		14.9%	34,275	32,026	+1.30%	743.56	287.09	46	120	23
Rizal		8.5%	19,554	17,038	+2.66%	281.79	108.80	69	180	14
Tabuk	†	52.7%	121,033	110,642	+1.72%	700.25	270.37	170	440	43
Tanudan		3.8%	8,746	9,534	−1.63%	307.55	118.75	28	73	16
Tinglayan		5.7%	13,148	12,868	+0.41%	283.00	109.27	46	120	20
Total			229,570	212,680	+1.47%	3,282.04	1,247.59	70	180	153
	† Provincial capital and component city					Municipality				

=== Barangays ===
The seven municipalities and one component city of the province comprise 153 barangays, with Bulanao in Tabuk as the most populous in 2010, and Anggacan Sur in Tanudan as the least. If the City of Tabuk is excluded, Pinukpuk Junction in Pinukpuk municipality has the highest population.

== Demographics ==
Population census of Kalinga (province)
Year	Pop.	±% p.a.
1903	17,660	—
1918	27,467	+2.99%
1939	31,320	+0.63%
1948	36,777	+1.80%
1960	59,927	+4.15%
1970	86,597	+3.75%
1975	102,110	+3.36%
1980	114,382	+2.29%
1990	137,055	+1.83%
1995	154,145	+2.23%
2000	174,023	+2.63%
2007	182,326	+0.64%
2010	201,613	+3.73%
2015	212,680	+1.02%
2020	229,570	+1.62%
2024	235,391	+0.60%
Source: Philippine Statistics Authority

Population by ethnicity (2000)
Ethnicity	Number
Kalinga	111,774 (64.37%)
Ilocano	41,633 (23.98%)
Kankanaey	4,421 (2.55%)
Ibontoc	2,804 (1.61%)
Tagalog	2,227 (1.28%)
Applai	1,730 (1.00%)
Others	8,115 (4.67%)
Not Reported	930 (0.54%)
Other foreign ethnicity	4 (0.002%)

The population of Kalinga in the 2024 census was 235,391 people, with a density of 73 inhabitants per square kilometre or 190 inhabitants per square mile.

On the 2000 census survey, Kalinga people comprised 64.37% (111,774) of the total provincial population of 173,638. Ilocanos came in second at 23.98% (41,633), while other ethnic groups in the province were the Kankanaey at 2.55% (4,421), Bontoc at 1.61% (2,804), Tagalog at 1.28% (2,227) and Applai at 1% (1,730).

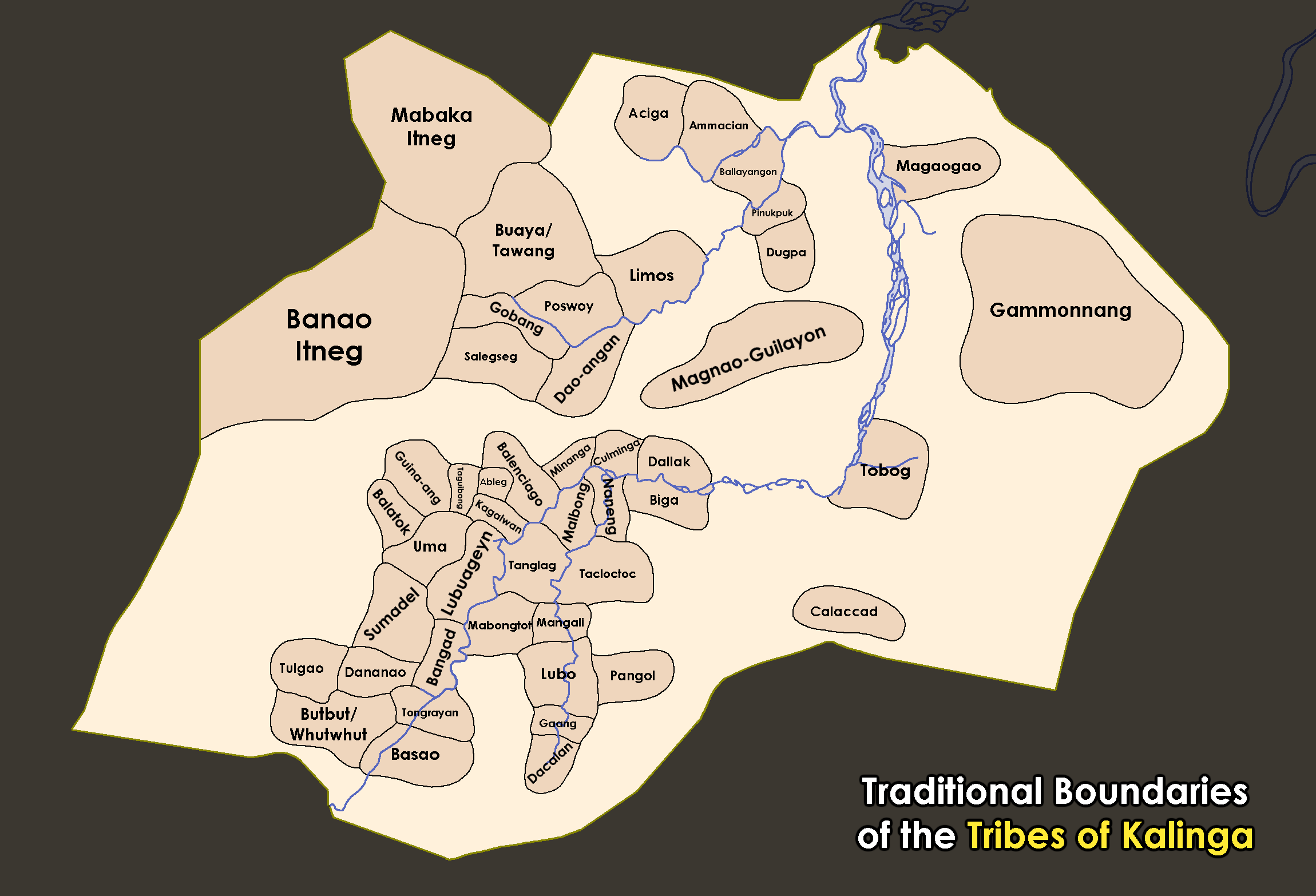
A map of the Kalinga sub-tribes within Kalinga Province.

=== Languages ===
The primary language spoken in Kalinga is Kalinga, including its dialects of Butbut, Limos, Lower Tanudan, Lubuagan, Mabaka, Madukayang, Southern Kalingan, and Upper Tanudan. Ilocano, Tagalog, and English are also spoken in as lingua francas with varying degrees of proficiency.

== Economy ==
Poverty incidence of Kalinga (%)

Source: Philippine Statistics Authority

The economy of Kalinga is a rapidly growing, mixed economy anchored in agriculture, particularly as the "rice granary of the Cordillera" with significant contributions to regional palay and corn production. While traditionally driven by agriculture, forestry, and fishing, the province has shifted toward a service-oriented economy. In recent years, Kalinga has seen robust economic performance, with a 6 percent GDP growth in 2023 and a 4 percent growth in 2024, driven by booming transportation, storage, and accommodation services, including significant tourism-related income from traditional tattoo artistry in areas like Buscalan. It is the third fastest-growing economy in the Cordillera Administrative Region, reflecting increased economic activity and infrastructure development.

== Culture ==
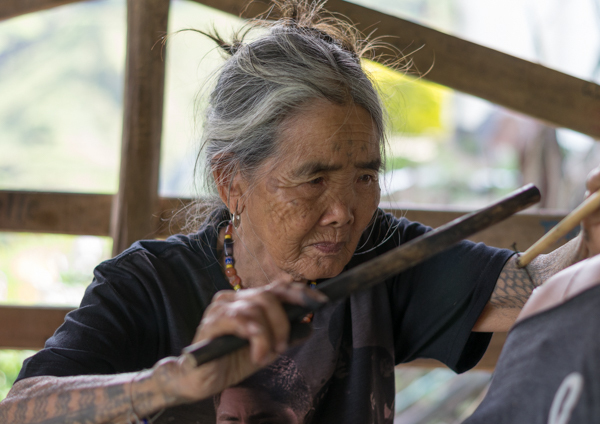
106-year old Apo Whang Od, the embodiment of Kalinga tattoo artistry.

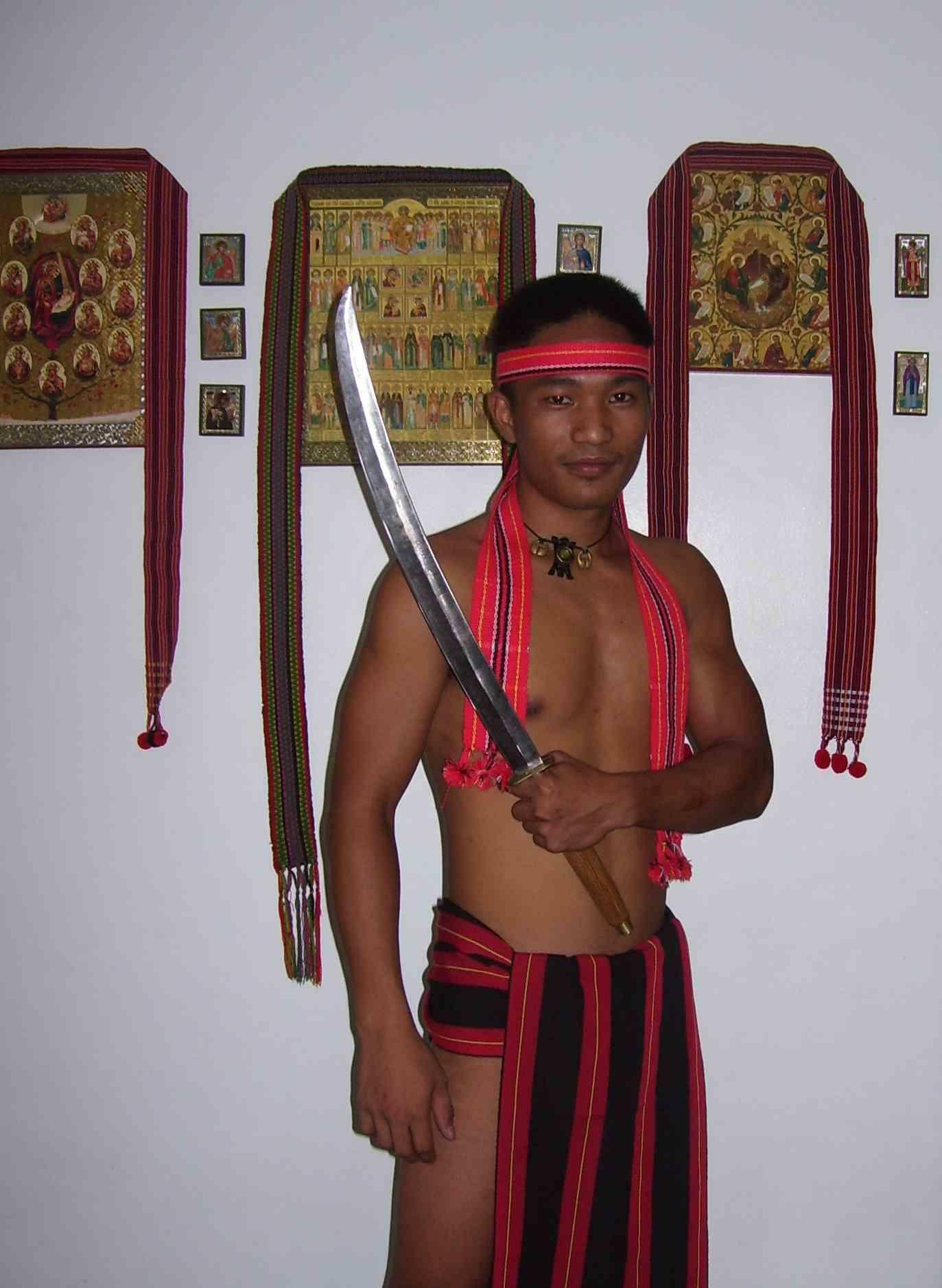
A student from Tinglayan, vested in traditional garb and holding a handcrafted weapon.

There are many sub-tribes in the province. The strong sense of tribal membership and filial loyalty results in frequent tribal unrest and occasional outright war. Due to the mountainous terrain and warrior-culture of the people, the Kalinga were able to preserve their culture despite centuries of occupation in the lowlands by the Spaniards, Americans, and the Japanese.

On February 22, 2019, the Department of Tourism announced the bid of Digdiga Ni Tupayya, a Kalinga courtship dance, to be included in the UNESCO Intangible Cultural Heritage Lists.

== Notable people ==
- Macli-ing Dulag - a Kalinga warrior and leader (pangat) who opposed the Chico River Dam Project and was killed by military personnel during martial law.
- Conrado Balweg - a former Catholic priest and founder of the Cordillera People's Liberation Army
- Whang-od - a Kalinga master tattooist (mambabatok) and recipient of the prestigious Dangal ng Haraya Award.
- Alonzo Saclag - Awarded as a National Living Treasure for his efforts to preserve the culture of Kalinga through performing arts.
- Jean Claude Saclag - martial artist
- Raffy Tima - newscaster, journalist
