= Pasil =

Municipality in Kalinga, Philippines

- Municipality
- Municipality of Pasil
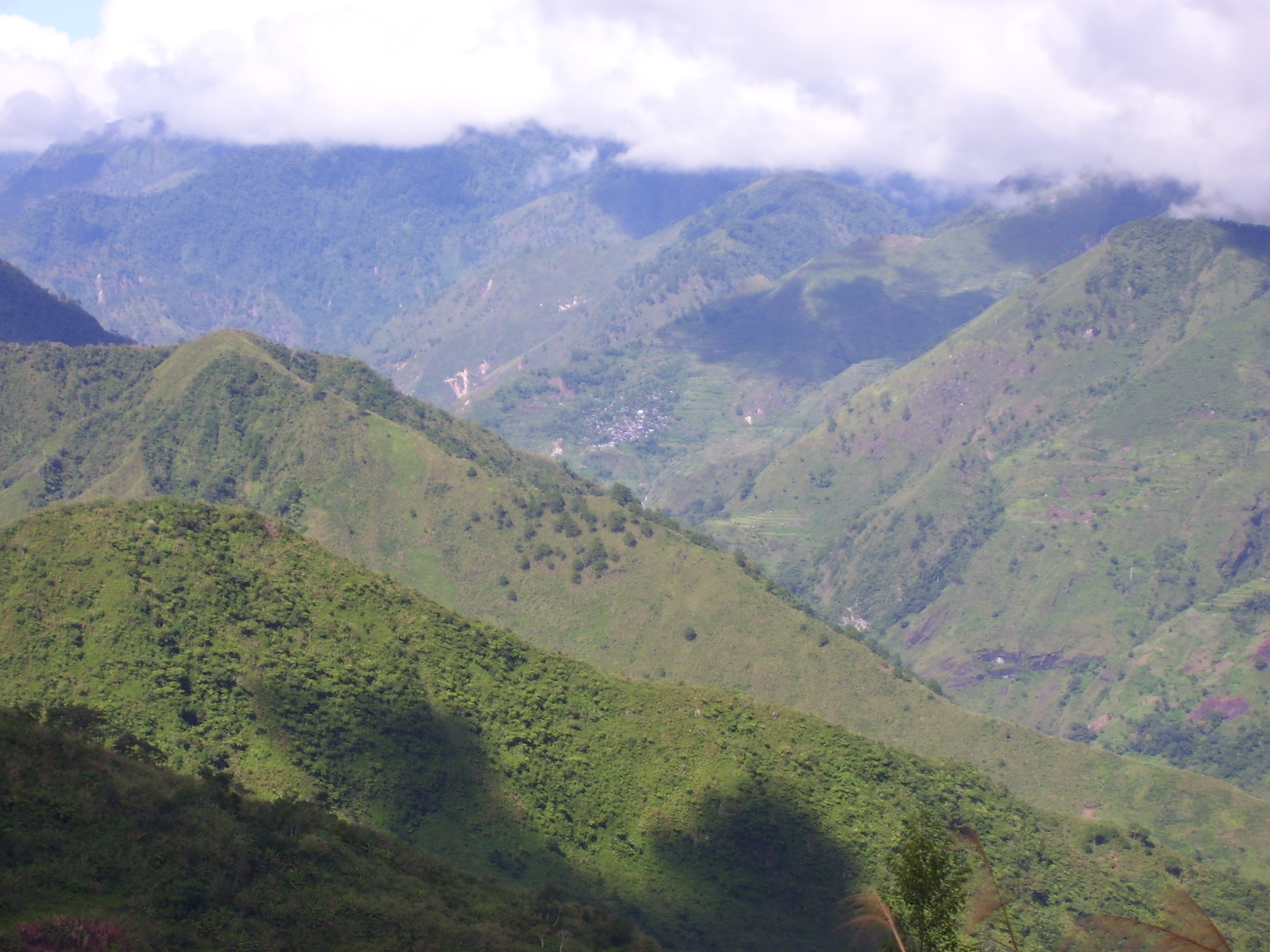
- Pasil River Valley

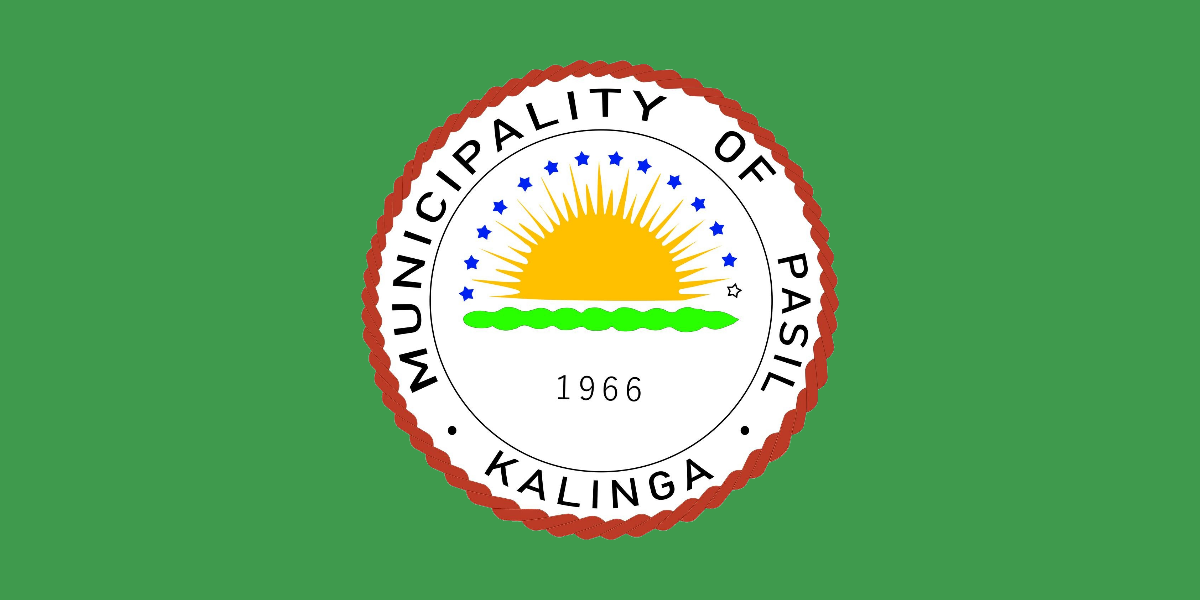
- Flag

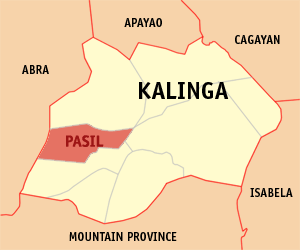
- Map of Kalinga with Pasil highlighted
- Interactive map of Pasil
- Location within the Philippines
- Coordinates: 17°23′22″N 121°09′35″E
- Country: Philippines
- Region: Cordillera Administrative Region
- Province: Kalinga
- District: Lone district
- Barangays: 14 (see Barangays)

Government
  - Type: Sangguniang Bayan
  - Mayor: Silvestre A. Mosing
  - Vice Mayor: Venancio O. Magangat
  - Representative: Caroline B. Agyao
  - Municipal Council: Members: Bernadette L. Wayaway; Chan Keight B. Patongao; Marcelino Peter L. Agabas; Billy B. Lingayo Jr.; Arnel B. Banasan; Peter M. Andomang; Ireneo L. Layugan; Lonely Lovely L. Aguac
  - Electorate: 7,592 voters (2025)

Area
  - Total: 189.00 km^{2} (72.97 sq mi)
- Elevation: 971 m (3,186 ft)
- Highest elevation: 2,000 m (6,600 ft)
- Lowest elevation: 357 m (1,171 ft)

Population (2024 census)
  - Total: 10,690
  - Density: 56.56/km^{2} (146.5/sq mi)
  - Households: 2,066

Economy
  - Income class: 4th municipal income class
  - Poverty incidence: 10.98% (2023)
  - Revenue: ₱ 125.7 million (2024)
  - Assets: ₱ 302 million (2024)
  - Expenditure: ₱ 120.3 million (2024)
  - Liabilities: ₱ 174.1 million (2024)

Service provider
  - Electricity: Kalinga - Apayao Electric Cooperative (KAELCO)
- Time zone: UTC+8 (PST)
- ZIP code: 3803
- PSGC: 1403208000
- IDD : area code: +63 (0)74
- Native languages: Kalinga; Ilocano; Tagalog
- Website: www.pasil.gov.ph

Pasil, officially the Municipality of Pasil, is a municipality in the southwestern part of Kalinga, Philippines. According to the 2024 census, it has a population of 10,690 people.

== Geography ==
It is bounded on the north by the municipality of Balbalan, on the south by the municipality of Tinglayan, on the east by Tabuk, and on the west by the province of Abra and south-western part of the municipality of Sadanga, Mountain Province.

Pasil is situated 51.39 kilometers (31.93 mi) from the provincial capital Tabuk, and 516.83 km (321.14 mi) from the country's capital city of Manila.

=== Barangays ===
Pasil is politically subdivided into 14 barangays. Each barangay consists of puroks and some have sitios.

- Ableg
- Bagtayan
- Balatoc
- Balenciagao Sur
- Balinciagao Norte
- Cagaluan
- Colayo
- Dalupa
- Dangtalan
- Galdang (Casaloan)
- Guina-ang (Poblacion)
- Magsilay
- Malucsad
- Pugong

=== Climate ===
Climate data for Pasil, Kalinga
| Month | Jan | Feb | Mar | Apr | May | Jun | Jul | Aug | Sep | Oct | Nov | Dec | Year |
|---|---|---|---|---|---|---|---|---|---|---|---|---|---|
| Mean daily maximum °C (°F) | 21 (70) | 23 (73) | 24 (75) | 26 (79) | 26 (79) | 25 (77) | 24 (75) | 24 (75) | 24 (75) | 24 (75) | 23 (73) | 21 (70) | 24 (75) |
| Mean daily minimum °C (°F) | 14 (57) | 15 (59) | 16 (61) | 17 (63) | 19 (66) | 19 (66) | 19 (66) | 19 (66) | 19 (66) | 17 (63) | 16 (61) | 15 (59) | 17 (63) |
| Average precipitation mm (inches) | 23 (0.9) | 28 (1.1) | 33 (1.3) | 64 (2.5) | 232 (9.1) | 242 (9.5) | 258 (10.2) | 266 (10.5) | 245 (9.6) | 201 (7.9) | 87 (3.4) | 69 (2.7) | 1,748 (68.7) |
| Average rainy days | 8.3 | 8.0 | 10.8 | 15.2 | 23.7 | 26.1 | 27.0 | 25.8 | 23.5 | 17.3 | 13.7 | 12.1 | 211.5 |
Source: Meteoblue

== Demographics ==
Population census of Pasil
| Year | Pop. | ±% p.a. |
|---|---|---|
| 1970 | 5,557 | — |
| 1975 | 6,755 | +3.99% |
| 1980 | 6,872 | +0.34% |
| 1990 | 7,572 | +0.97% |
| 1995 | 8,935 | +3.15% |
| 2000 | 9,360 | +1.00% |
| 2007 | 10,084 | +1.03% |
| 2010 | 9,626 | −1.68% |
| 2015 | 9,644 | +0.04% |
| 2020 | 10,577 | +1.96% |
| 2024 | 10,690 | +0.26% |
Source: Philippine Statistics Authority

In the 2024 census, the population of Pasil was 10,690 people, with a density of 57/km^{2} or 150/sq mi.

== Economy ==
Poverty incidence of Pasil (%)

Source: Philippine Statistics Authority

Pasil's economy relies on agriculture. Pasil was recognized as the first Slow Food Community in the Philippines. There are heritage crops in Pasil like Chong-ak Rice and Kalinga Ulikan Red Rice.

== Government ==
=== Local government ===
Pasil, belonging to the lone congressional district of the province of Kalinga, is governed by a mayor designated as its local chief executive and by a municipal council as its legislative body in accordance with the Local Government Code. The mayor, vice mayor, and the councilors are elected directly by the people through an election which is being held every three years.

=== Elected officials ===
Members of the Municipal Council (2025–2028)
| Position | Name |
|---|---|
| Congressman | Caroline B. Agyao |
| Mayor | Silvestre A. Mosing |
| Vice-Mayor | Venancio O. Magangat |
| Councilors | Bernadette L. Wayaway |
| Councilors | Chan Keight B. Patongao |
| Councilors | Marcelino Peter L. Agabas |
| Councilors | Billy B. Lingayo Jr. |
| Councilors | Arnel B. Banasan |
| Councilors | Peter M. Andomang |
| Councilors | Ireneo L. Layugan |
| Councilors | Lonely Lovely L. Aguac |

== Folklore ==
In an earlier time, Kabunian–the supreme deity of the Kalinga–left a drop of water upon an ancient tree he passed on one of his travels. This drop trickled down and with a great force akin to magnetism, attracted nearby brooks and rivulets to form what is now the Pasil River.

== Education ==
The Pasil Schools District Office governs all educational institutions within the municipality. It oversees the management and operations of all private and public, from primary to secondary schools.

=== Primary and elementary schools ===
- Ableg Elementary School
- Bagtayan Elementary School
- Balatoc Elementary School
- Batong Buhay Elementary School
- Balinciagao Elementary School
- Balinciagao Elementary School - Wagas Primary School Annex
- Cagaluan Elementary School
- Cagaluan Elementary School Annex (Da-o Primary School)
- Cagaluan Elementary School Annex (Putao Primary School)
- Colayo Elementary School
- Dalupa Elementary School
- Dangtalan Elementary School
- Galdang Elementary School
- Magsilay Elementary School
- Pasil Central School
- Pasil Central School (Guinaang Annex)
- Pasil Central School (Malucsad Annex)
- Pasil Central School ( Pugong Annex)
- Balinciagao Elementary School - Limood Annex

=== Secondary schools ===
- Batong Buhay National High School
- Central Pasil National High School
- Pasil National High School
