= Mount Alchanon =

Mountain in Kalinga, Philippines

- Mount Alchanar

Highest point
- Elevation: 2,617 m (8,586 ft)
- Prominence: 1,297 m (4,255 ft)
- Coordinates: 17.2502°N 120.9694°E

Geography
- Country: Philippines
- Region: Cordillera Administrative Region
- Province: Kalinga
- Parent range: Cordillera Central

Mount Alchanon, also known as Mount Alchanar, is one of the high elevation peaks in the Cordillera Central mountain range in the Philippines. It is located in the province of Kalinga near the border of northern portion of Mountain Province in the island of Luzon. It is the highest point in Kalinga and 20th-highest mountain of the Philippines at 2,617 metres (8,586 ft) above sea level.
