= Tanudan =

Municipality in Kalinga, Philippines

- Municipality
- Municipality of Tanudan
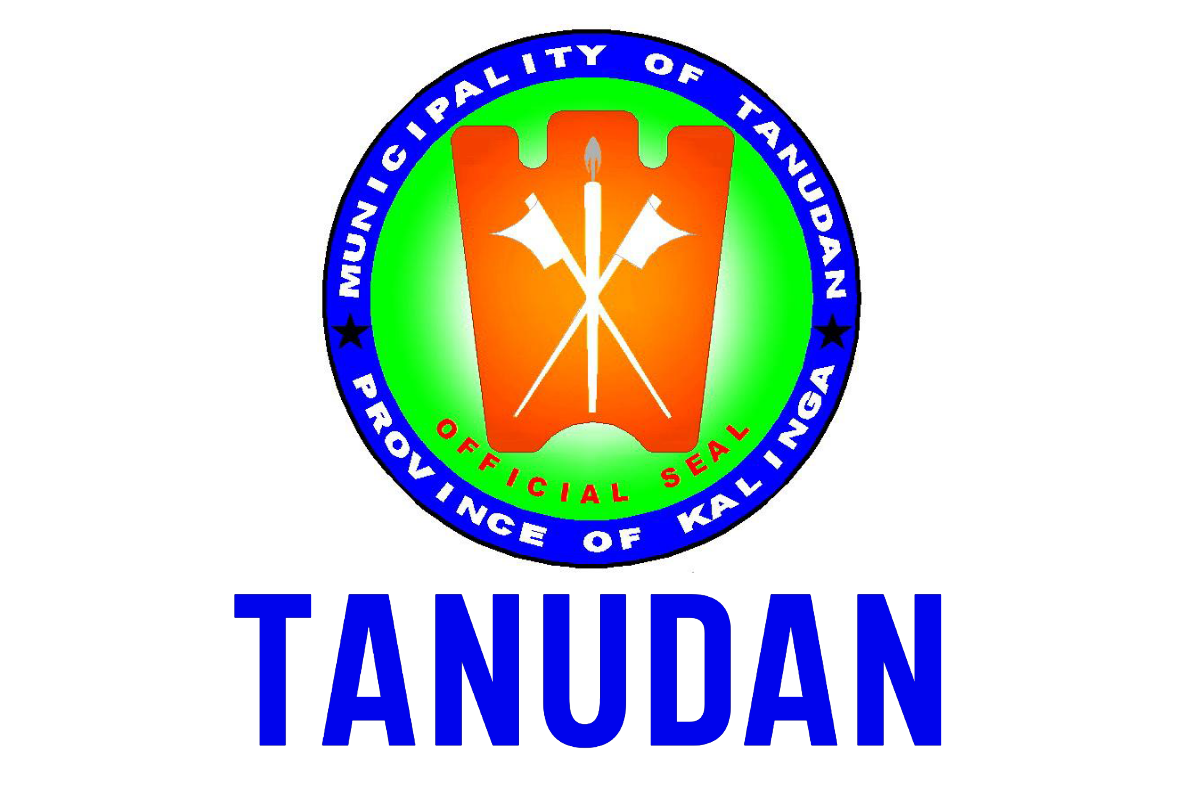
- Flag

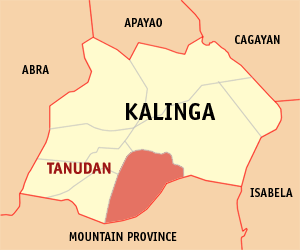
- Map of Kalinga with Tanudan highlighted
- Interactive map of Tanudan
- Location within the Philippines
- Coordinates: 17°16′53″N 121°13′49″E
- Country: Philippines
- Region: Cordillera Administrative Region
- Province: Kalinga
- District: Lone district
- Barangays: 16 (see Barangays)

Government
  - Type: Sangguniang Bayan
  - Mayor: Jaedicke Rhoss P. Dagadag
  - Vice Mayor: Antonio Basungit Jr.
  - Representative: Caroline Agyao
  - Municipal Council: Members: Eusebio "Guena" Salicanto; Leon "Parangdao" Bulakit; Shelton Pao-iton; Lourdes A. Masa-ao; Alex Ladwingon; Johnny Liddawa; Helen A. Gacadan; Federico Tiggangay
  - Electorate: 10,017 voters (2025)

Area
  - Total: 307.55 km^{2} (118.75 sq mi)
- Elevation: 905 m (2,969 ft)
- Highest elevation: 1,828 m (5,997 ft)
- Lowest elevation: 431 m (1,414 ft)

Population (2024 census)
  - Total: 11,103
  - Density: 36.101/km^{2} (93.502/sq mi)
  - Households: 1,568

Economy
  - Income class: 3rd municipal income class
  - Poverty incidence: 7.2% (2023)
  - Revenue: ₱ 147.7 million (2024)
  - Assets: ₱ 423.9 million (2024)
  - Expenditure: ₱ 140.7 million (2024)
  - Liabilities: ₱ 81.07 million (2024)

Service provider
  - Electricity: Kalinga - Apayao Electric Cooperative (KAELCO)
- Time zone: UTC+8 (PST)
- ZIP code: 3805
- PSGC: 1403214000
- IDD : area code: +63 (0)74
- Native languages: Kalinga; Ilocano; Tagalog
- Website: www.tanudan.gov.ph

Tanudan, officially the Municipality of Tanudan, is a municipality in the province of Kalinga, Philippines. According to the 2024 census, it has a population of 11,103 people.

== Folklore ==
The town is known for Mount Binaratan. Legend tells that the supreme god of the Kalinga people went into the mountain to hunt but was irritated due to the noises made by the birds, so he ordered the birds to be quiet. When he was done hunting, he forgot to revoke his order from the birds, and thus, the mountain kept silent for all of eternity.

Another popular place is the Lubo Village, whose houses are strategically surrounded with rice terraces. Legend says that a brave warrior challenged God, claiming that no one was stronger than him. So God started building a dam made of rocks. When the water became high enough, God released the water through a hole called "lubu" that drowned the warrior and his family. The people from Ga-ang and Dacalan gathered together with the remnants of the relatives of the said warrior and saw that the flooded soil was good for planting rice, so they started to cultivating the land and named the village "Lubo".

== Geography ==
Tanudan is situated 47.53 kilometres (29.53 mi) from the provincial capital Tabuk, and 484.88 kilometres (301.29 mi) from the country's capital city of Manila.

=== Barangays ===
Tanudan is politically subdivided into 16 barangays. Each barangay consists of puroks and some have sitios.

- Anggacan
- Anggacan Sur
- Babbanoy
- Dacalan
- Dupligan
- Ga-ang
- Lay-asan
- Lower Lubo
- Lower Mangali
- Lower Taloctoc
- Mabaca
- Mangali Centro
- Pangol
- Poblacion
- Upper Lubo
- Upper Taloctoc

=== Climate ===
Climate data for Tanudan, Kalinga
| Month | Jan | Feb | Mar | Apr | May | Jun | Jul | Aug | Sep | Oct | Nov | Dec | Year |
|---|---|---|---|---|---|---|---|---|---|---|---|---|---|
| Mean daily maximum °C (°F) | 23 (73) | 24 (75) | 27 (81) | 29 (84) | 29 (84) | 29 (84) | 28 (82) | 28 (82) | 27 (81) | 26 (79) | 25 (77) | 23 (73) | 27 (80) |
| Mean daily minimum °C (°F) | 18 (64) | 18 (64) | 19 (66) | 20 (68) | 22 (72) | 22 (72) | 22 (72) | 22 (72) | 22 (72) | 21 (70) | 20 (68) | 19 (66) | 20 (69) |
| Average precipitation mm (inches) | 78 (3.1) | 60 (2.4) | 49 (1.9) | 51 (2.0) | 194 (7.6) | 197 (7.8) | 209 (8.2) | 226 (8.9) | 185 (7.3) | 180 (7.1) | 143 (5.6) | 183 (7.2) | 1,755 (69.1) |
| Average rainy days | 15.6 | 12.5 | 11.8 | 12.5 | 21.0 | 23.3 | 25.2 | 26.1 | 22.6 | 17.1 | 16.7 | 19.6 | 224 |
Source: Meteoblue

== Demographics ==
Population census of Tanudan
| Year | Pop. | ±% p.a. |
|---|---|---|
| 1939 | 3,720 | — |
| 1948 | 3,849 | +0.38% |
| 1960 | 4,607 | +1.51% |
| 1970 | 5,696 | +2.14% |
| 1975 | 5,914 | +0.76% |
| 1980 | 6,327 | +1.36% |
| 1990 | 9,323 | +3.95% |
| 1995 | 11,243 | +3.57% |
| 2000 | 10,275 | −1.91% |
| 2007 | 8,119 | −3.20% |
| 2010 | 8,529 | +1.81% |
| 2015 | 9,534 | +2.14% |
| 2020 | 8,746 | −1.80% |
| 2024 | 11,103 | +5.90% |
Source: Philippine Statistics Authority

In the 2024 census, the population of Tanudan was 11,103 people, with a density of 36 inhabitants per square kilometre or 93 inhabitants per square mile.

== Economy ==
Poverty incidence of Tanudan (%)

Source: Philippine Statistics Authority

Tanudan's economy is rural-based that focuses on coffee production and agriculture. Tanudan is recognized as one of Kalinga's major coffee-producing municipalities. Aside from coffee, Tanudan's farmers grow rice, corn, and root crops.

== Government ==
=== Local government ===
Tanudan, belonging to the lone congressional district of the province of Kalinga, is governed by a mayor designated as its local chief executive and by a municipal council as its legislative body in accordance with the Local Government Code. The mayor, vice mayor, and the councilors are elected directly by the people through an election which is being held every three years.

=== Elected officials ===
Members of the Municipal Council (2025–2028)
| Position | Name |
|---|---|
| Congressman | Caroline B. Agyao |
| Mayor | Jaedicke Rhoss P. Dagadag |
| Vice-Mayor | Antonio L. Basungit Jr. |
| Councilors | Eusebio B. Salicanto |
| Councilors | Leon B. Bulakit |
| Councilors | Shelton M. Pao-iton |
| Councilors | Lourdes A. Masa-ao |
| Councilors | Alex I. Ladwingon |
| Councilors | Johnny M. Liddawa |
| Councilors | Helen A. Gacadan |
| Councilors | Federico W. Tiggangay |

== Education ==
The Schools District Offices which govern all educational institutions within the municipality. They oversee the management and operations of all private and public, from primary to secondary schools. There are two schools district offices, namely: Lower Tanudan, and Upper Tanudan.

=== Primary and elementary schools ===
- Allubaggan Elementary School
- Ammaboy Elementary School
- Anggacan Elementary School
- Babbanoy Elementary School
- Baclayam Elementary School
- Biga Elementary School
- Cabugao Elementary School
- Dacalan Elementary School
- Darulog Elementary School
- Gaang Elementary School
- Liyang Elementary School
- Lubo Elementary School
- Mabaca Elementary School
- Magtoma Elementary School
- Mangali Centro Elementary School
- Mantopngan Elementary School
- Pagugo Elementary School
- Pangol Elementary School
- Pitang Primary School
- Taloctoc Elementary School
- Tanudan Central School
- Tinangban Primary School

=== Secondary schools ===
- Biga National High School
- Magtoma Pangol National High School-Main
- Taloctoc General Comprehensive National High School
- Tanudan National High School
- Tanudan Vocational School
