= Rizal, Kalinga =

Municipality in Kalinga, Philippines

Rizal Liwan
- Municipality
- Municipality of Rizal
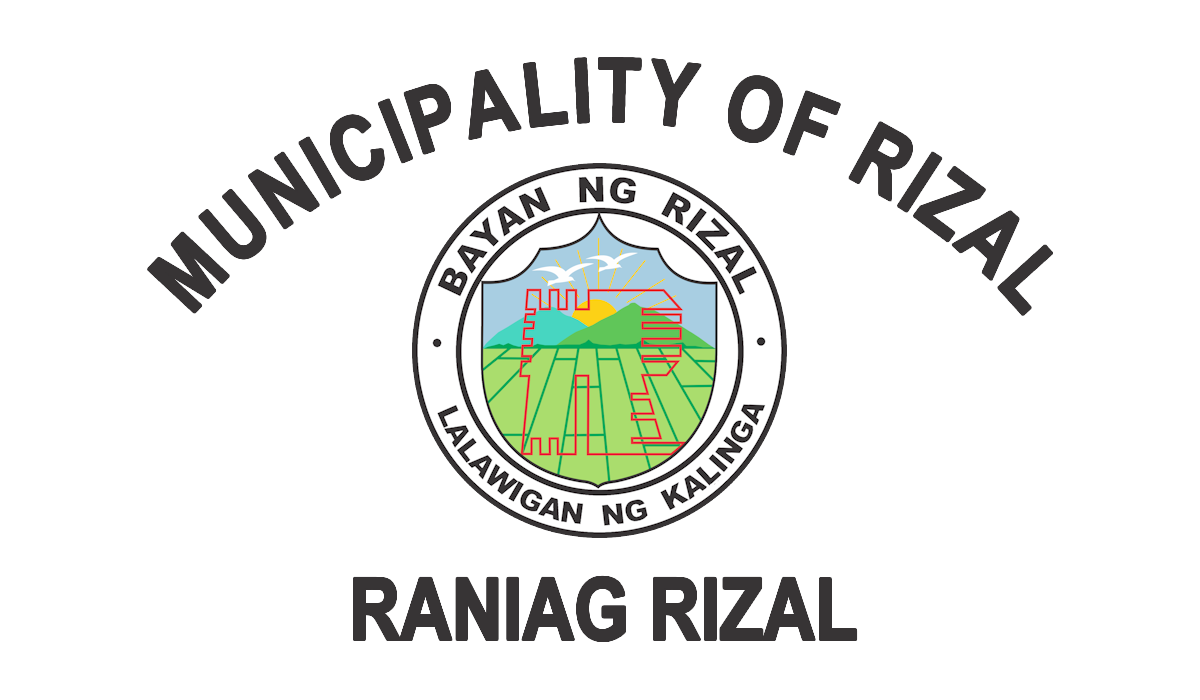
- Flag

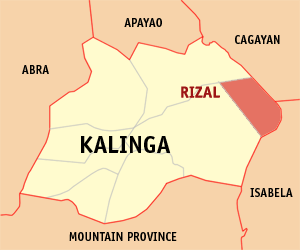
- Map of Kalinga with Rizal highlighted
- Interactive map of Rizal
- Location within the Philippines
- Coordinates: 17°30′N 121°36′E
- Country: Philippines
- Region: Cordillera Administrative Region
- Province: Kalinga
- District: Lone district
- Named for: José Rizal
- Barangays: 14 (see Barangays)

Government
  - Type: Sangguniang Bayan
  - Mayor: Karl Bugao P. Baac
  - Vice Mayor: Ronald R. Echalar
  - Representative: Caroline B. Agyao
  - Municipal Council: Members: Anselmo E. Bador; Elmer A. Morales; Consolacion D. Catalon; Joseph V. Lumabi; Nellie S. Tad-o; Efraim B. Orodio; Vladimir Jetti G. Lampitoc; Samuel C. Valdez
  - Electorate: 14,299 voters (2025)

Area
  - Total: 231.00 km^{2} (89.19 sq mi)
- Elevation: 114 m (374 ft)
- Highest elevation: 433 m (1,421 ft)
- Lowest elevation: 53 m (174 ft)

Population (2024 census)
  - Total: 20,491
  - Density: 88.706/km^{2} (229.75/sq mi)
  - Households: 4,461

Economy
  - Income class: 3rd municipal income class
  - Poverty incidence: 4.1% (2023)
  - Revenue: ₱ 163.5 million (2024)
  - Assets: ₱ 594.5 million (2024)
  - Expenditure: ₱ 182.8 million (2024)
  - Liabilities: ₱ 57.39 million (2024)

Service provider
  - Electricity: Kalinga - Apayao Electric Cooperative (KAELCO)
- Time zone: UTC+8 (PST)
- ZIP code: 3808
- PSGC: 1403211000
- IDD : area code: +63 (0)74
- Native languages: Kalinga; Ilocano; Tagalog
- Website: www.rizalkalinga.gov.ph

Rizal (formerly known as Liwan), officially the Municipality of Rizal is a municipality in the province of Kalinga, Philippines. According to the 2024 census, it has a population of 20,491 people.

The town is famous for its Pleistocene archaeological site which possesses rhino bones, tools, deer bones, turtle remains, and stegodon bones. The butchered rhino bones were confirmed by international scientific journals as proof of ancient hominids in the Philippines dating back to 709,000 years ago, the oldest hominid evidence in the entire Philippine archipelago. The discovery was confirmed in 2018, and has been a game-changer in Philippine prehistory.

== Geography ==
Rizal is situated 22.34 kilometres (13.88 mi) from the provincial capital Tabuk, and 462.51 kilometres (287.39 mi) from the country's capital city of Manila.

=== Barangays ===
Rizal is politically subdivided into 14 barangays. Each barangay consists of puroks and some have sitios.

- Babalag East (Poblacion)
- Babalag West (Poblacion)
- Bulbol
- Calaocan
- Kinama
- Liwan East
- Liwan West
- Macutay
- Romualdez
- San Francisco
- San Pascual
- San Pedro
- San Quintin
- Santor

=== Climate ===
Climate data for Rizal, Kalinga
Month	Jan	Feb	Mar	Apr	May	Jun	Jul	Aug	Sep	Oct	Nov	Dec	Year
Mean daily maximum °C (°F)	26 (79)	27 (81)	29 (84)	32 (90)	32 (90)	31 (88)	31 (88)	30 (86)	30 (86)	29 (84)	27 (81)	26 (79)	29 (85)
Mean daily minimum °C (°F)	21 (70)	21 (70)	22 (72)	23 (73)	24 (75)	25 (77)	24 (75)	25 (77)	24 (75)	23 (73)	23 (73)	21 (70)	23 (73)
Average precipitation mm (inches)	109 (4.3)	78 (3.1)	64 (2.5)	54 (2.1)	181 (7.1)	196 (7.7)	204 (8.0)	211 (8.3)	174 (6.9)	198 (7.8)	185 (7.3)	231 (9.1)	1,885 (74.2)
Average rainy days	17.2	13.7	13.2	13.0	21.7	23.4	25.2	25.2	21.9	17.7	18.6	20.8	231.6
Source: Meteoblue

== Demographics ==
Population census of Rizal
Year	Pop.	±% p.a.
1970	8,034	—
1975	11,715	+7.86%
1980	11,637	−0.13%
1990	10,885	−0.67%
1995	12,173	+2.12%
2000	13,652	+2.49%
2007	14,614	+0.94%
2010	15,942	+3.22%
2015	17,038	+1.27%
2020	19,554	+2.94%
2024	20,491	+1.13%
Source: Philippine Statistics Authority

In the 2024 census, the population of Rizal was 20,491 people, with a density of 89 inhabitants per square kilometre or 230 inhabitants per square mile.

== Economy ==
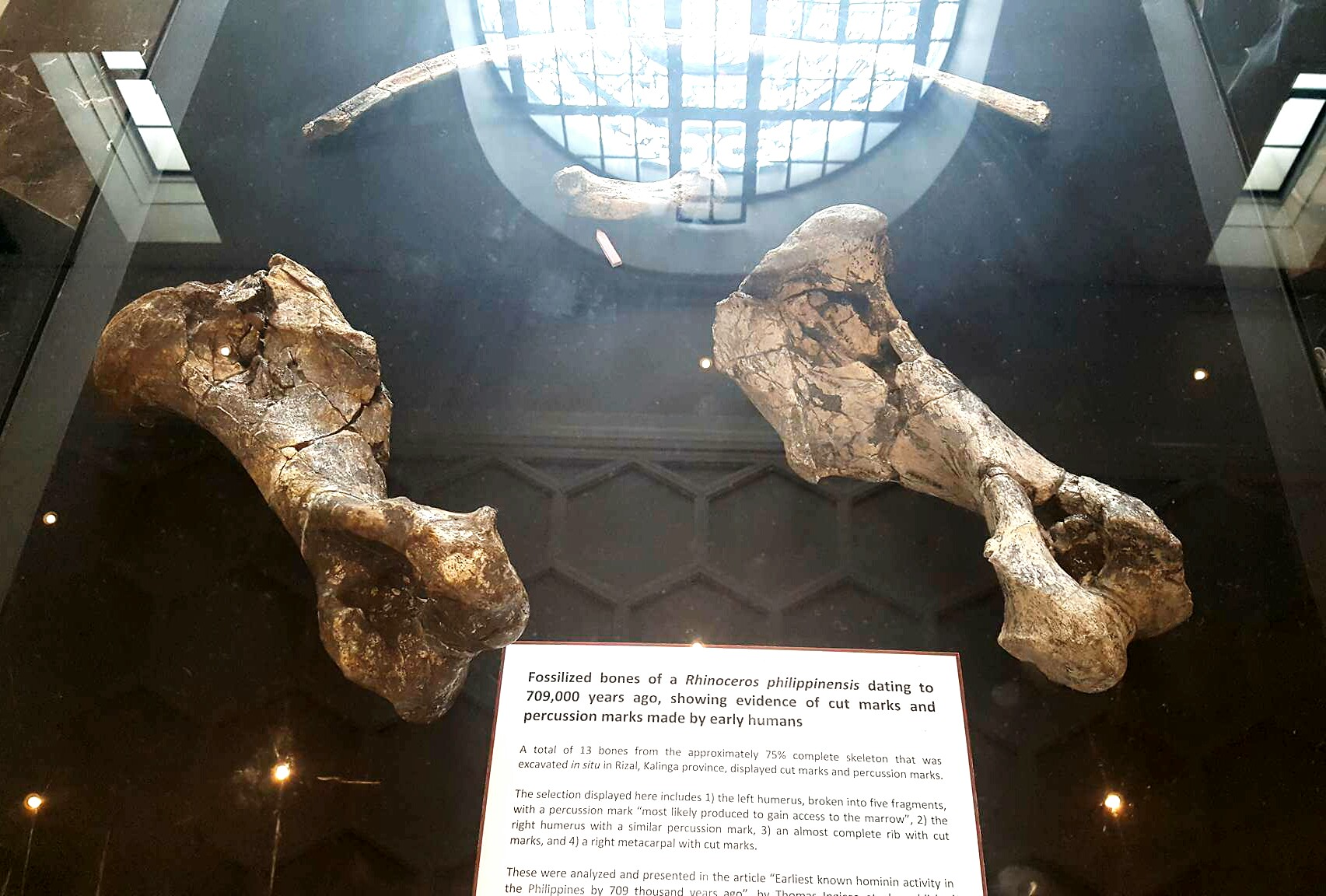
Butchered remains of a Nesorhinus philippinensis found in Rizal, Kalinga. An evidence of early hominins in the Philippines about 709,000 years ago.

Poverty incidence of Rizal (%)

Source: Philippine Statistics Authority

The municipality of Rizal relies heavily on agriculture as main source of economy, particularly corn, rice, cassava, and sugarcane. Rizal serves as one of the economic contributors in Kalinga.

== Government ==
Rizal, belonging to the lone congressional district of the province of Kalinga, is governed by a mayor designated as its local chief executive and by a municipal council as its legislative body in accordance with the Local Government Code. The mayor, vice mayor, and the councilors are elected directly by the people through an election which is being held every three years.

=== Elected officials ===
Members of the Municipal Council (2025–2028)
Position	Name
Congressman	Caroline B. Agyao
Mayor	Karl Bugao P. Baac
Vice-Mayor	Ronald R. Echalar
Councilors	Anselmo E. Bador
Councilors	Elmer A. Morales
Councilors	Consolacion D. Catalon
Councilors	Joseph V. Lumabi
Councilors	Nellie S. Tad-o
Councilors	Efraim B. Orodio
Councilors	Vladimir Jetti G. Lampitoc
Councilors	Samuel C. Valdez

== Education ==
The Rizal Schools District Office governs all educational institutions within the municipality. It oversees the management and operations of all private and public, from primary to secondary schools.

=== Primary and elementary schools ===
- Andarayan Elementary School
- Anonang Elementary School
- Bagbag Elementary School
- Bulbol Elementary School
- Calaocan Elementary School
- Kinama Elementary School
- Liwan East Elementary School
- Liwan West Elementary School
- Liwan West Elementary School Annex (Alibangbang Primary School)
- Macutay Elementary School
- Rizal Central School
- Romualdez Elementary School
- San Francisco Elementary School
- San Pedro Elementary School
- San Quintin Elementary School
- San Vicente Elementary School
- Santor Elementary School
- Tagapan Elementary School

=== Secondary schools ===
- Kinama National High School
- Macutay Palao National High School
- Rizal National School of Arts & Trades
- Santor National High School
- St. Michael Academy

== See also ==
- List of renamed cities and municipalities in the Philippines
