= Pinukpuk =

Municipality in Kalinga, Philippines

- Municipality
- Municipality of Pinukpuk
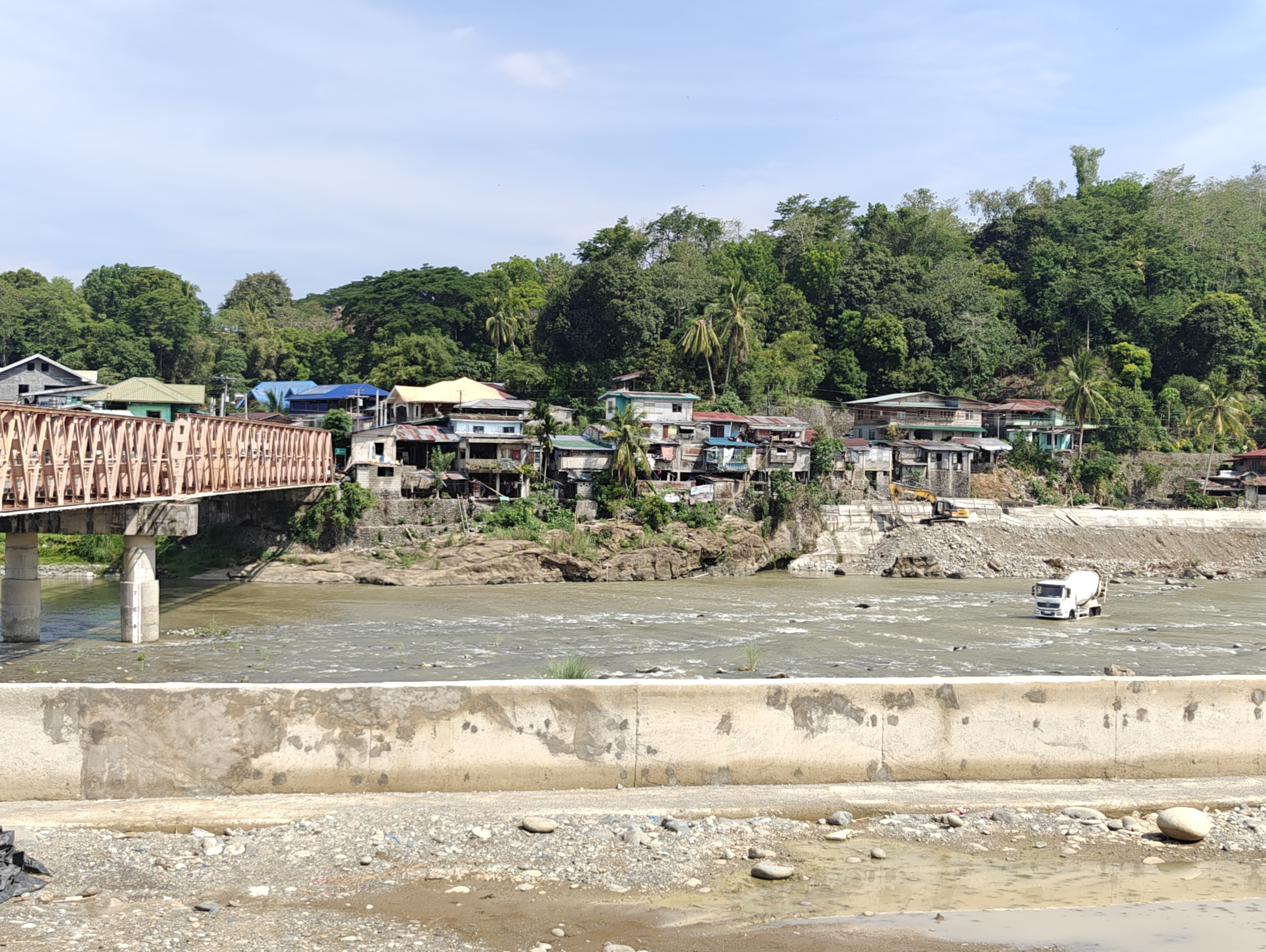
- Saltan Bridge and Pinukpuk

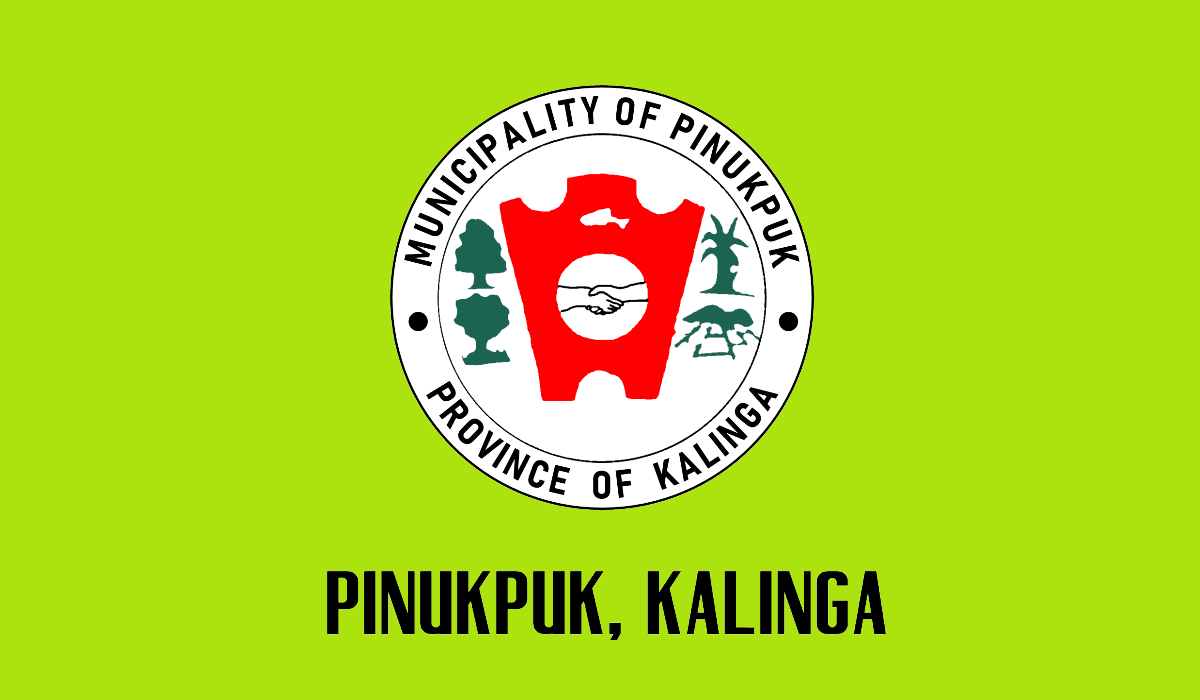
- Flag

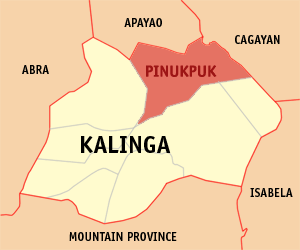
- Map of Kalinga with Pinukpuk highlighted
- Interactive map of Pinukpuk
- Location within the Philippines
- Coordinates: 17°34′23″N 121°21′55″E
- Country: Philippines
- Region: Cordillera Administrative Region
- Province: Kalinga
- District: Lone district
- Barangays: 23 (see Barangays)

Government
  - Type: Sangguniang Bayan
  - Mayor: Jimmy B. Dasayon
  - Vice Mayor: Shirlynne B. Dasayon-Alunday
  - Representative: Caroline B. Agyao
  - Municipal Council: Members: Dennis G. Tannong; Oswald B. Alunday; Theodora P. Hortelano; Janice Grace B. Catriz-Tuddao; John D. Lingbawan; Gloria B. Bagsao; Marilou Q. Iddoba; Jerold A. Tuppiyac
  - Electorate: 21,564 voters (2025)

Area
  - Total: 743.56 km^{2} (287.09 sq mi)
- Elevation: 257 m (843 ft)
- Highest elevation: 636 m (2,087 ft)
- Lowest elevation: 74 m (243 ft)

Population (2024 census)
  - Total: 35,033
  - Density: 47.115/km^{2} (122.03/sq mi)
  - Households: 7,290

Economy
  - Income class: 1st municipal income class
  - Poverty incidence: 9.84% (2023)
  - Revenue: ₱ 329.3 million (2024)
  - Assets: ₱ 1,148 million (2024)
  - Expenditure: ₱ 202.7 million (2024)
  - Liabilities: ₱ 96.95 million (2024)

Service provider
  - Electricity: Kalinga - Apayao Electric Cooperative (KAELCO)
- Time zone: UTC+8 (PST)
- ZIP code: 3806
- PSGC: 1403209000
- IDD : area code: +63 (0)74
- Native languages: Kalinga; Ilocano; Tagalog
- Website: www.pinukpuk.gov.ph

Pinukpuk, officially the Municipality of Pinukpuk, is a municipality in the province of Kalinga, Philippines. According to the 2024 census, it has a population of 35,033 people.

== History ==
Pinukpuk, while being a municipal district, reduced its territories when Governor-General Leonard Wood issued executive orders transferring barrios of Mabaca, Buaya, and Canna to Balbalan (EO No. 16; issued on June 23, 1926 and effective July 1), as well as Barrio Puguin and sitios of Umnay, Bauban, and Daga to Conner in the sub-province of Apayao (EO No. 55; issued on March 19, 1927 and effective April 1).

== Geography ==
The Municipality of Pinukpuk is in the northern part of Kalinga province, which is a gateway to Tuao, Cagayan, and Conner, Apayao.

Pinukpuk is situated 40.38 kilometres (25.09 mi) from the provincial capital Tabuk, and 505.82 kilometres (314.30 mi) from the country's capital city of Manila.

=== Barangays ===
Pinukpuk is politically subdivided into 23 barangays. Each barangay consists of puroks and some have sitios.

- Aciga
- Allaguia
- Ammacian
- Apatan
- Asibanglan
- Ba-ay
- Ballayangon
- Bayao
- Camalog (formerly Camcamalog)
- Cawagayan (formerly Cagao-ayan)
- Dugpa
- Katabbogan
- Limos
- Magaogao
- Malagnat
- Mapaco
- Pakawit
- Pinococ
- Pinukpuk Junction-Center
- Socbot
- Taga (Poblacion)
- Taggay
- Wagud

=== Climate ===
Climate data for Pinukpuk, Kalinga
Month	Jan	Feb	Mar	Apr	May	Jun	Jul	Aug	Sep	Oct	Nov	Dec	Year
Mean daily maximum °C (°F)	26 (79)	27 (81)	29 (84)	32 (90)	32 (90)	31 (88)	31 (88)	30 (86)	30 (86)	29 (84)	27 (81)	26 (79)	29 (85)
Mean daily minimum °C (°F)	20 (68)	21 (70)	22 (72)	23 (73)	24 (75)	25 (77)	24 (75)	25 (77)	24 (75)	23 (73)	23 (73)	21 (70)	23 (73)
Average precipitation mm (inches)	109 (4.3)	78 (3.1)	64 (2.5)	54 (2.1)	181 (7.1)	196 (7.7)	204 (8.0)	211 (8.3)	174 (6.9)	198 (7.8)	185 (7.3)	231 (9.1)	1,885 (74.2)
Average rainy days	17.2	13.7	13.2	13.0	21.7	23.4	25.2	25.2	21.9	17.7	18.6	20.8	231.6
Source: Meteoblue

== Demographics ==
Population census of Pinukpuk
Year	Pop.	±% p.a.
1918	5,397	—
1939	4,353	−1.02%
1948	4,612	+0.64%
1960	7,030	+3.57%
1970	10,470	+4.06%
1975	11,557	+2.00%
1980	17,362	+8.48%
1990	20,102	+1.48%
1995	23,057	+2.60%
2000	26,130	+2.72%
2007	27,783	+0.85%
2010	29,596	+2.33%
2015	32,026	+1.51%
2020	34,275	+1.44%
2024	35,033	+0.53%
Source: Philippine Statistics Authority

In the 2024 census, the population of Pinukpuk was 35,033 people, with a density of 47 inhabitants per square kilometre or 120 inhabitants per square mile.

== Economy ==
Poverty incidence of Pinukpuk (%)

Source: Philippine Statistics Authority

Agriculture is the primary source of economy in Pinukpuk. Major crops of Pinukpuk include palay (rice) and corn. Pinukpuk's commerce and trade serve as an active trading node connecting Kalinga to Tuao in Cagayan and Conner in Apayao.

== Government ==
=== Local government ===
Pinukpuk, belonging to the lone congressional district of the province of Kalinga, is governed by a mayor designated as its local chief executive and by a municipal council as its legislative body in accordance with the Local Government Code. The mayor, vice mayor, and the councilors are elected directly by the people through an election which is being held every three years.

=== Elected officials ===
Members of the Municipal Council (2025–2028)
Position	Name
Congressman	Caroline B. Agyao
Mayor	Jimmy B. Dasayon
Vice-Mayor	Shirlynne B. Dasayon-Alunday
Councilors	Dennis G. Tannong
Councilors	Oswald B. Alunday
Councilors	Theodora P. Hortelano
Councilors	Janice Grace B. Catriz-Tuddao
Councilors	John D. Lingbawan
Councilors	Gloria B. Bagsao
Councilors	Marilou Q. Iddoba
Councilors	Jerold A. Tuppiyac

== Education ==
The schools district offices which govern all educational institutions within the municipality.They oversee the management and operations of all private and public, from primary to secondary schools. There are two schools district offices namely: Northern Pinukpuk, and Southern Pinukpuk.

=== Primary and elementary schools ===
- Aciga Elementary School
- Aguimitan Primary School
- Allaguia Elementary School
- Ammacian Elementary School
- Apatan Elementary School
- Asibanglan Elementary School
- Baclas Elementary School
- Ballayangon Elementary School
- Bayao Elementary School
- Binansagan Elementary School
- Bonnong Primary School
- Calbayan Elementary School
- Camalog Elementary School
- Cawagayan Elementary School
- Coddog Elementary School
- Dugpa Elementary School
- Dupagan Elementary School
- Katabbogan Elementary School
- Kullayanan Elementary School
- Limos Elementary School
- Liplipoken Elementary School
- Lutab Elementary School
- Magaogao Elementary School
- Malaap Elementary School
- Malagnat Elementary School
- Mapaco Elementary School
- Pakawit Elementary School
- Pinococ Elementary School
- Pinukpuk Central School
- Pinukpuk Elementary School
- Sagsag Elementary School
- Socbot Elementary School
- Taggay Elementary School
- Tappo Elementary School
- Tappo Elementary School - Allangigan Annex
- Wagud Elementary School

=== Secondary schools ===
As of July 2021, Pinukpuk has 10 Secondary Schools.

- Allaguia National High School
- Asibanglan National High School
- Cal-owan Agricultural Vocational National High School
- Camalog National High School
- Cawagayan National High School
- Limos National High School
- Malagnat National High School
- Pinukpuk Vocational School
- Socbot National High School
- St. Theresita High School - Pinukpuk
