= Balbalan =

Municipality in Kalinga, Philippines

- Municipality
- Municipality of Balbalan
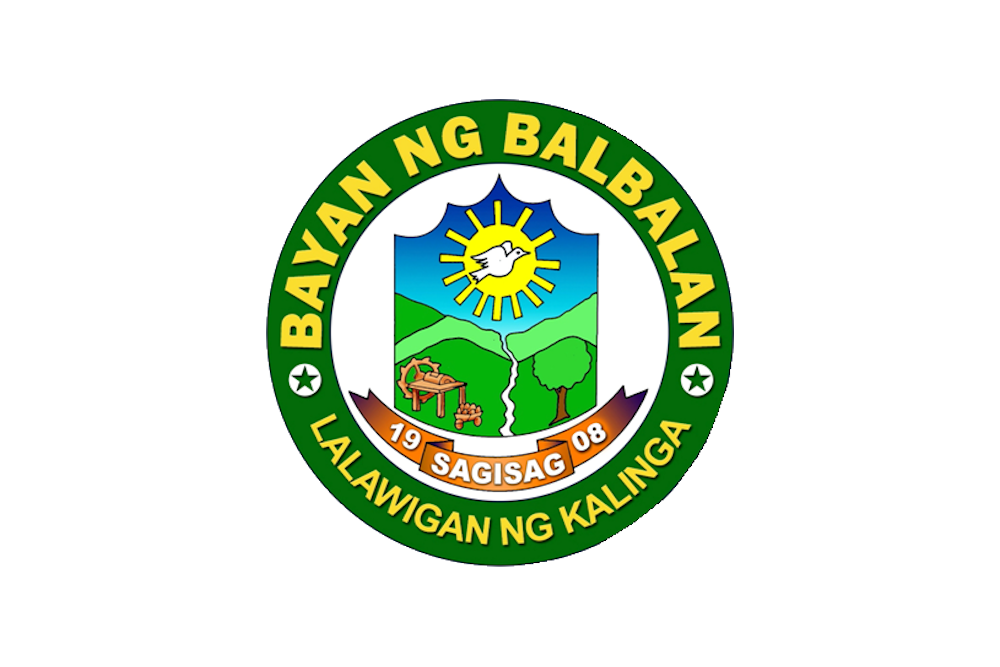
- Flag

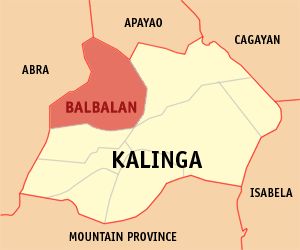
- Map of Kalinga with Balbalan highlighted
- Interactive map of Balbalan
- Location within the Philippines
- Coordinates: 17°26′37″N 121°12′03″E
- Country: Philippines
- Region: Cordillera Administrative Region
- Province: Kalinga
- District: Lone district
- Barangays: 14 (see Barangays)

Government
  - Type: Sangguniang Bayan
  - Mayor: Almar P. Malannag
  - Vice Mayor: Regina D. Munda Cruz
  - Representative: Caroline B. Agyao
  - Municipal Council: Members: Amy Grace D. Ulep; Renato D. Calma; Eugene T. Dao-ayan Jr.; Jefffred B. Tabcao; Marion A. Gacayan; Simeon D. Apaling Jr.; Clarence D. Tongdo; Ricardo M. Ignacio
  - Electorate: 9,361 voters (2025)

Area
  - Total: 542.69 km^{2} (209.53 sq mi)
- Elevation: 1,067 m (3,501 ft)
- Highest elevation: 2,077 m (6,814 ft)
- Lowest elevation: 308 m (1,010 ft)

Population (2024 census)
  - Total: 13,332
  - Density: 24.567/km^{2} (63.627/sq mi)
  - Households: 2,528

Economy
  - Income class: 1st municipal income class
  - Poverty incidence: 7.8% (2023)
  - Revenue: ₱ 224.7 million (2024)
  - Assets: ₱ 750.7 million (2024)
  - Expenditure: ₱ 172.1 million (2024)
  - Liabilities: ₱ 185.6 million (2024)

Service provider
  - Electricity: Kalinga - Apayao Electric Cooperative (KAELCO)
- Time zone: UTC+8 (PST)
- ZIP code: 3801
- PSGC: 1403201000
- IDD : area code: +63 (0)74
- Native languages: Kalinga; Ilocano; Tagalog
- Website: www.balbalan.gov.ph

Balbalan, officially the Municipality of Balbalan, is a municipality in the province of Kalinga, Philippines. According to the 2024 census, it has a population of 13,332 people.

== History ==
=== Spanish colonial era ===
The Spaniards made at least 10 incursions (Note: In The Kalinga Hilltribe of the Philippines (1990, 13-15), Sugguiyao lists three, but a comparative study of available documents as cited reveals more than that number.) into the land of the Kalingas from the early 1600s to the late 1800s, four of which were made from the west (Abra) primarily targeting the regions of Banao and Guinaang. Although they succeeded around the mid-1800s in establishing a telegraph station in Balbalasang (where, incidentally, they appointed the noted Banao leader Juan Puyao as a gobernadorcillo or councilor) and subsequently hacking out an Ilocos-Abra-Kalinga-Cagayan trail, they failed to establish a foothold in Kalinga.

Prior to the establishment of American rule in Kalinga, the ethnic sub-groups covered by the present geopolitical configuration of Balbalan were, like other Kalinga communities at that time, organized according to an indigenous system or concept of local governance operating within a “bilateral kinship group” circumscribed by semi-permanent territorial boundary. (Note: Barton referred to these territories as “regions,” which is perhaps roughly equivalent to what the German traveler Alexander Schadenberg (1886) called “province,” as in “Banao province” (Scott 1975, 131). Note, however, that, according to Scott in another work (1974, 313), there was no such village as Banao, although “people from Inalangan down the Saltan River to Salegseg referred to themselvfes as Banao people.” Schadenberg also mentioned a “Chief Liagao” in the rancheria of Balbalasang (Scott 1975, 133).)

This period saw the rise of several community leaders often mentioned in Balbalan orature: Sagaoc, Balutoc, Masadao, Gaddawan, Dawegoy, Lang-ayan, Bayudang, Gammong, et al.

=== American colonial era ===
When the Americans imposed their system of government over the archipelago, the land of the Kalingas became one of the highlights of their so-called “pacification campaign.” On 18 August 1907, Kalinga, then a sub-province of Lepanto-Bontoc, came under the control of Lt. Gov. Walter Franklin Hale who established his seat of government in Lubuagan where he organized the sub-province into four districts: Tinglayan-Tanudan; Balbalan-Pasil; Pinukpuk-Tobog (Tabuk), and Liwan (Rizal).

A year later, Act 1870 of the Philippine Commission carved the old Mountain Province out of northern Luzon with Kalinga as one of its five sub-provinces. Kalinga was immediately reorganized into five municipal districts — Lubuagan (including Tanudan and Pasil), Balbalan (including Balinciagao), Tabuk (with Liwan or Rizal), Tinglayan, and Pinukpuk — each led by presidents. Among these municipal chiefs was Puyao (Note: Along with Lubuagan Presidente Antonio Canao, Puyao’s leadership and his contribution to the success of American rule in Kalinga prompted then Congressman of the old Mountain Province Alfredo Lam-en to file a bill seeking to rename Balbalan and Lubuagan “Puyao” and “Canao,” respectively (Finin 2005, 194).) who served in that capacity for close to 24 years under five subprovincial chief executives: Walter F. Hale (1907–1915), Alex F. Gilfilan (1915), Samuel E. Kane (1915–1919), Tomas Blanco (1918–1923), and Nicasio Balinag (1923–1936). Puyao did not run for office during the first local elections in the area in 1934, and was succeeded by Awingan. Three years later, municipal chief executives became known as “Municipal District Mayors.”

In 1942 a Japanese garrison was established in Balbalan.

== Geography ==
Balbalan is situated 51.24 kilometres (31.84 mi) from the provincial capital Tabuk, and 530.68 kilometres (329.75 mi) from the country's capital city of Manila.

=== Barangays ===
Balbalan is politically subdivided into 14 barangays. Each barangay consists of puroks and some have sitios.

- Ababa-an
- Balantoy
- Balbalan Proper
- Balbalasang
- Buaya
- Dao-angan
- Gawa-an
- Mabaca
- Maling (Kabugao)
- Pantikian
- Poswoy
- Poblacion (Salegseg)
- Talalang
- Tawang

=== Climate ===
Climate data for Balbalan, Kalinga
| Month | Jan | Feb | Mar | Apr | May | Jun | Jul | Aug | Sep | Oct | Nov | Dec | Year |
|---|---|---|---|---|---|---|---|---|---|---|---|---|---|
| Mean daily maximum °C (°F) | 20 (68) | 21 (70) | 24 (75) | 26 (79) | 26 (79) | 26 (79) | 25 (77) | 24 (75) | 24 (75) | 23 (73) | 22 (72) | 20 (68) | 23 (74) |
| Mean daily minimum °C (°F) | 15 (59) | 15 (59) | 16 (61) | 17 (63) | 19 (66) | 19 (66) | 19 (66) | 19 (66) | 18 (64) | 18 (64) | 17 (63) | 16 (61) | 17 (63) |
| Average precipitation mm (inches) | 78 (3.1) | 60 (2.4) | 49 (1.9) | 51 (2.0) | 194 (7.6) | 197 (7.8) | 209 (8.2) | 226 (8.9) | 185 (7.3) | 180 (7.1) | 143 (5.6) | 183 (7.2) | 1,755 (69.1) |
| Average rainy days | 15.6 | 12.5 | 11.8 | 12.5 | 21.0 | 23.3 | 25.2 | 26.1 | 22.6 | 17.1 | 16.7 | 19.6 | 224 |
Source: Meteoblue

== Demographics ==
Population census of Balbalan
| Year | Pop. | ±% p.a. |
|---|---|---|
| 1918 | 6,238 | — |
| 1939 | 5,670 | −0.45% |
| 1948 | 6,184 | +0.97% |
| 1960 | 7,605 | +1.74% |
| 1970 | 6,518 | −1.53% |
| 1975 | 7,552 | +3.00% |
| 1980 | 9,168 | +3.95% |
| 1990 | 10,147 | +1.02% |
| 1995 | 11,742 | +2.77% |
| 2000 | 11,934 | +0.35% |
| 2007 | 12,012 | +0.09% |
| 2010 | 12,082 | +0.21% |
| 2015 | 12,195 | +0.18% |
| 2020 | 12,914 | +1.21% |
| 2024 | 13,332 | +0.77% |
Source: Philippine Statistics Authority

In the 2024 census, the population of Balbalan was 13,332 people, with a density of 25 inhabitants per square kilometre or 65 inhabitants per square mile.

== Economy ==
Poverty incidence of Balbalan (%)

Source: Philippine Statistics Authority

Balbalan's economy relies on agriculture, mining, and micro-enterprises. Balbalan's residents grow and process coffee. Balbalan's agriculture involves traditional farming and food production. Balbalan's mining sustains communities and local miners.

== Government ==
=== Local government ===
Balbalan, belonging to the lone congressional district of the province of Kalinga, is governed by a mayor designated as its local chief executive and by a municipal council as its legislative body in accordance with the Local Government Code. The mayor, vice mayor, and the councilors are elected directly by the people through an election which is being held every three years.

=== Elected officials ===
Members of the Municipal Council (2025–2028)
| Position | Name |
|---|---|
| Congressman | Caroline B. Agyao |
| Mayor | Almar P. Malannag |
| Vice-Mayor | Regina D. Munda Cruz |
| Councilors | Amy Grace D. Ulep |
| Councilors | Renato D. Calma |
| Councilors | Eugene T. Dao-ayan Jr. |
| Councilors | Jefffred B. Tabcao |
| Councilors | Marion A. Gacayan |
| Councilors | Simeon D. Apaling Jr. |
| Councilors | Clarence D. Tongdo |
| Councilors | Ricardo M. Ignacio |

== Education ==
The Balbalan Schools District Office governs all educational institutions within the municipality. It oversees the management and operations of all private and public, from primary to secondary schools.

=== Secondary schools ===
- Balbalan Agricultural and Industrial School
- Balbalan National High school
- St. Paul's Memorial School of Kalinga
- St. Theresita High School of Salegseg
- Western Kalinga National High School

== See also ==
- Balbalasang-Balbalan National Park
