= Legislative districts of Kalinga =

Legislative district of the Philippines

The legislative districts of Kalinga are the representations of the province of Kalinga in the various national legislatures of the Philippines. The province is currently represented in the lower house of the Congress of the Philippines through its lone congressional district.

== History ==
Prior to gaining separate representation, areas now under the jurisdiction of Kalinga were represented under the former Mountain Province (1917–1969) and Kalinga-Apayao (1969–1998). Kalinga became a separate province following the passage and subsequent ratification of Republic Act No. 7878 on May 8, 1995. In accordance with Section 9 of R.A. 7878 the new province began electing its own representative in the 1998 elections.

Beginning in 2019, the districts used in appropriation of members is coextensive with the legislative districts of Kalinga. Prior to 2019 when the province was just one congressional district, the Commission on Elections divided the province into two provincial board districts.

== Lone District ==
- Population (2015): 212,680

Period	Representative
11th Congress; 1998–2001	Laurence B. Wacnang
12th Congress; 2001–2004	Laurence B. Wacnang
13th Congress; 2004–2007	Laurence B. Wacnang
14th Congress; 2007–2010	Manuel S. Agyao
15th Congress; 2010–2013	Manuel S. Agyao
16th Congress; 2013–2016	Manuel S. Agyao
17th Congress; 2016–2019	Allen Jesse C. Mangaoang
18th Congress; 2019–2022	Allen Jesse C. Mangaoang
19th Congress; 2022–2025	Allen Jesse C. Mangaoang
20th Congress; 2025–2028	Caroline Agyao

== See also ==
- Legislative districts of Mountain Province
- Legislative district of Kalinga–Apayao
