= Traditional Philippine musical instruments =

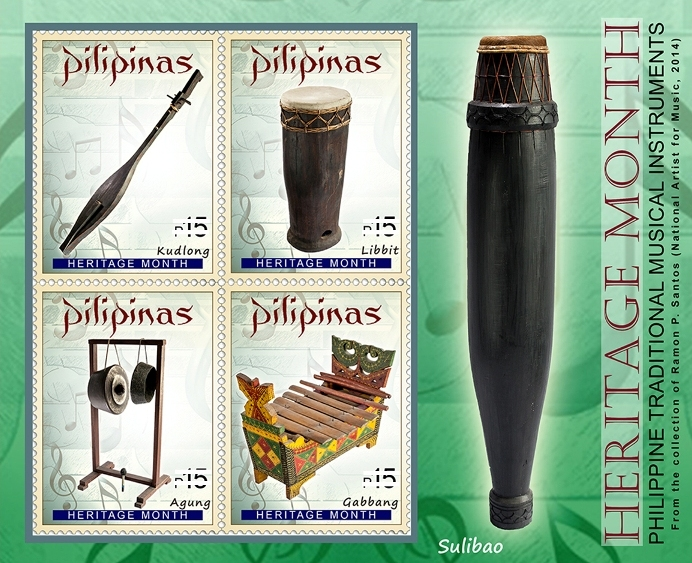
A 2016 stamp featuring Philippine traditional musical instruments

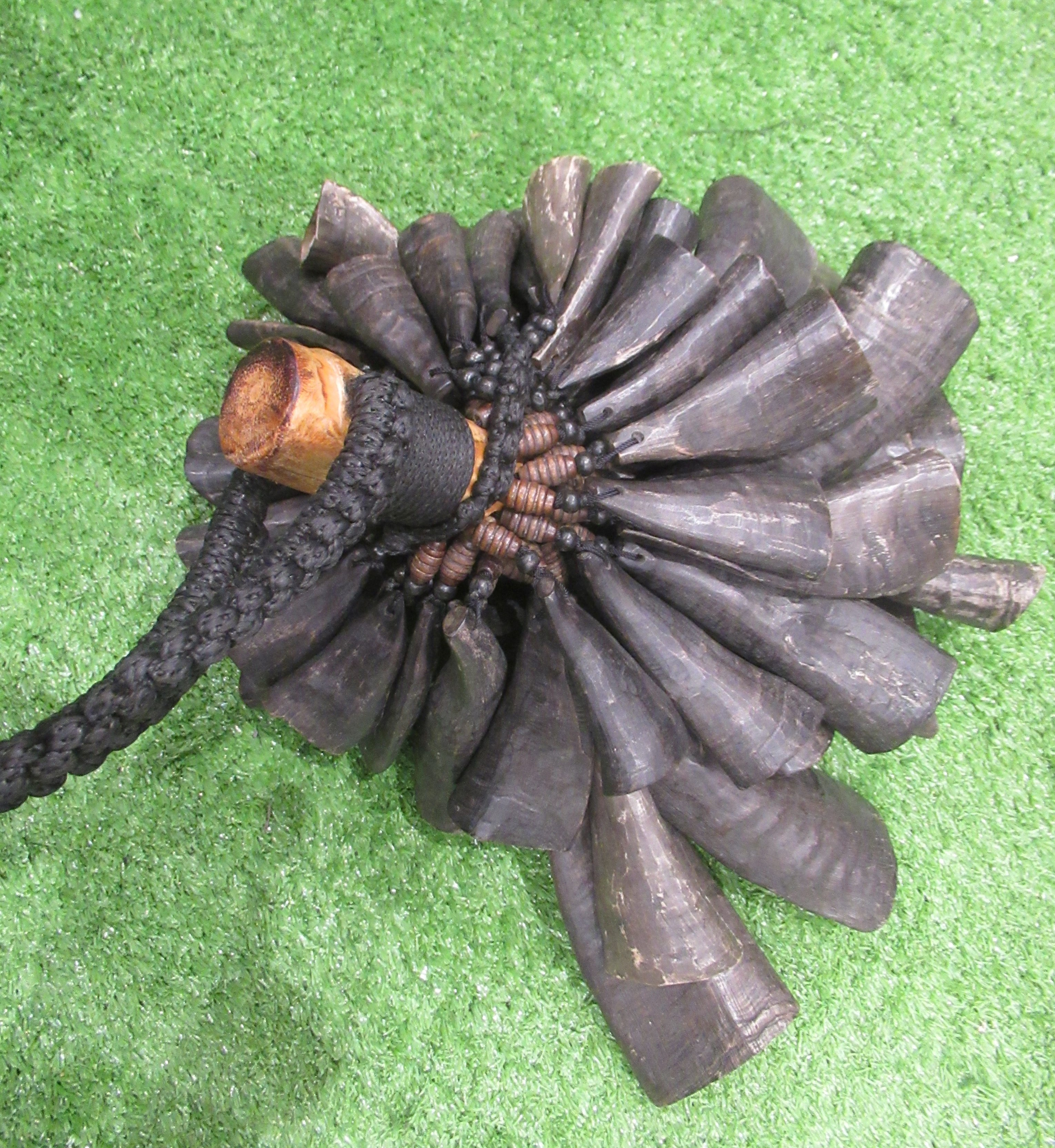
Philippine folk music "Sungay ng Kalabaw"

Philippine traditional musical instruments are commonly grouped into four categories: aerophones, chordophones, membranophones, and idiophones.

== Aerophones ==
- Bulungudyong – vertical flute (Pinatubo Ayta)
- Diwas
- Palendag – lip-valley flute (Kalinga)
- Tongali – nose flute (Kalinga)
- Tumpong – bamboo flute
- Tulali – flute with 6 holes
- Bansik – bamboo flute with three holes of the Negrito people in Zambales
- Tambuli – Carabao horn

== Chordophones ==
- Litguit – a three-stringed bamboo violin of the Aeta people
- Butting – a bow with a single hemp 5 string, plucked with a small stick
- Faglong – a two-stringed, lute-like instrument of the B'laan; made in 1997
- Budlong – bamboo zither
- Kolitong – a bamboo zither
- Pas-ing – a two-stringed bamboo with a hole in the middle from Apayao people
- Kudyapi – a two-stringed boat lute from Mindanao

== Membranophones ==
- Dabakan – goblet drum (Maranao)
- Gandang – double-headed barrel drum (Maranao)
- Libbit – conical drum (Ifugao)
- Sulibao – conical drum (Ibaloi)
- Gambal – war drums

== Idiophones ==
- Agung a tamlang – bamboo (slit drum)
- Agung – large gong suspended from an ornate frame
- Bungkaka – bamboo buzzer
- Gandingan – set of four large hanging knobbed gongs
- Kagul – scraper
- Kulintang – set of eight tuned gongs placed horizontally in an ornate frame, tuned pentatonic scale|pentatonically.
- Gabbang – bamboo xylophone (Yakan, Batak, B'laan, Sama-Bajau, Tausūg)
- Luntang – wooden beams hanging from a frame (Maguindanaon)
- Kulintang a tiniok – set of eight, tuned knobbed metal plates strung on a wooden frame (Maguindanaon)
- Babandil – small gong
- Saronay – eight tuned knobbed metal plates strung over a wooden frame (Maranao)
- Tongatong – stamping tubes of the Kalinga people

== Sources ==
- Canave-Dioquino, Corazon. "Philippine Music Instruments". National Commission for Culture and the Arts. Archived from the original on December 1, 2008.
- Manuel, E. Arsenio (1978). "Towards an Inventory of Philippine Musical Instruments: A Checklist of the Heritage from Twenty-three Ethnolinguistic Groups" (PDF). Asian Studies. Quezon City, Philippines: University of the Philippines Diliman. OCLC 6593501. Archived from the original (PDF) on September 20, 2023.
- Dioquino, Corazon (October 22, 2009). "Philippine Bamboo Instruments". Humanities Diliman: A Philippine Journal of Humanities. 5 (1&2). University of the Philippines Diliman. ISSN 2012-0788. Archived from the original on June 23, 2011.
