= Apayao (disambiguation) =

Apayao may refer to:

- Apayao Province, since 1995 a province in the Philippines
- Apayao language
- Apayao people, also called Isneg
- Apayao River
