= Takumbo =

Philippine tube zither

Takumbo (Bukidnon)
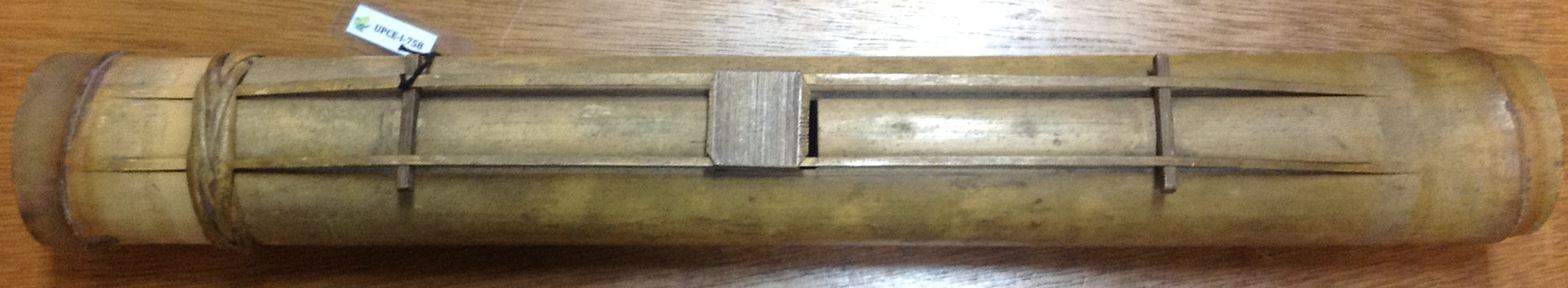
- A Takumbo from the Philippines.

String instrument
- Other names: Bambam (Isneg), Pasing (Isneg), Tambi (Kalinga), Tabenbbeng (Ayta Magkunana), Kudlong (Hanunuo), Katimbok (Manobo), Tabobo (Manobo), Tabobok (Subanon), Thambobok (Subanon), Patigunggung (Batak), Serongagandi (Maranao)
- Classification: String instrument
- Hornbostel–Sachs classification: 312.11 (Simple chordophone or zither)

Related instruments
- plucked and struck string instruments

Takumbo
A Takumbo with its center plate struck

The takumbo is a parallel-stringed tube zither made from bamboo, and is found in the Philippines. It is made from a heavy bamboo tube about 40 cm long, with both ends closed with a node. Two strands of strings, about 5 cm apart, are partially etched out from the body of the bamboo. Small wooden bridges are inserted beneath the strings at both ends. At the center of the bamboo tube, below the strings, a small hole is bored. The small hole is covered with a bamboo plate clipped to the strings.

== Playing techniques ==
In playing the takumbo, the musician can either strike the center plate or the string, or he can also pluck the string with his fingers (Batak). The instrument can be also played by striking the body of the bamboo.

== Instrument variations ==
The takumbo instrument, with slight variations, is also found in northern Luzon (Isneg. Bambam, Pasing, Kalingga, Tambi; in Zambales (Ayta Magkunana. Tabenbbeng; in Mindoro (Hanunuo, Kudlong; in Mindanao (Manobo Katimbok), Tabobo; Subanon Tabobok, Thambabok); and in Palawan (Batak, Patigunggung). The Subanon instrument has an opening on the upper node which the player covers and uncovers while performing. The Subanon play the thambabok mainly for self-entertainment and relaxation.

=== Parallel-stringed half-tube zither ===
The bamboo half-tube zither found among the Ifugao is called Tadcheng, Tedcheng, Gacheng, or Ayudding. It has two to four strings which, depending on the style of playing, are plucked with the fingers or struck with small bamboo sticks. Boys and men play the tadcheng for entertainment, often tapping rhythms patterned after those played on the gongs.

== See also ==
- Bungkaka
- Diwas
- Gabbang
- Kolitong
- Paldong
