= Paldong =

Philippine flute

Woodwind instrument
- Classification: Aerophones; Hornbostel–Sachs number
- Hornbostel–Sachs classification: (Open single end-blown flutes – The lower end of the flute is open with fingerholes)

Playing range
- ca. 2 1/2 octaves from b♭

Related instruments
- Palendag

The paldong is a traditional lip-valley flute of the Kalinga tribes in the Philippines.

== Design ==
It is an open, single end-blown flute. The lower end of the flute has three fingerholes.

The instrument is made from bamboo with its upper edge cut away obliquely from the backside and slightly from the front-side. The paldong is open at both ends, with a total of four fingerholes: three in front, and one at the back. The player's lower lip is placed against the cut away surface.

== Role ==
The paldong is used for serenades, courting women, for leisure and to pass the time. Melodies are mostly improvised. The song titles describe what the melody is trying to mimic, such as the chirping of a bird, the cry of an eagle, the buzz of a wasp, etc.

== Instrument variations ==
The lip-valley flutes in the Philippines are known by different names: abalao, abellao, sinongyop (Bontoc); balding, paldong, enoppok, innupok (Kalinga); tipano, kipano, paldeng (Isneg); and taladi (Ibaloi); palendag (Maguindanao); palalu (Mansaka); Palandag (Bagobo). The lip-valley flutes from the Southern Philippines tend to be longer than those from the Northern Philippines.

== See also ==
- Palendag (a similar, less refined, end-blown bamboo flute)
- Tumpong
- Tongali (Philippine nose flute)
- Suling
- Diwas
- Gabbang
- Bungkaka
- Takumbo
- Kolitong
