= Kolitong =

Philippine bamboo polychordal tube zither

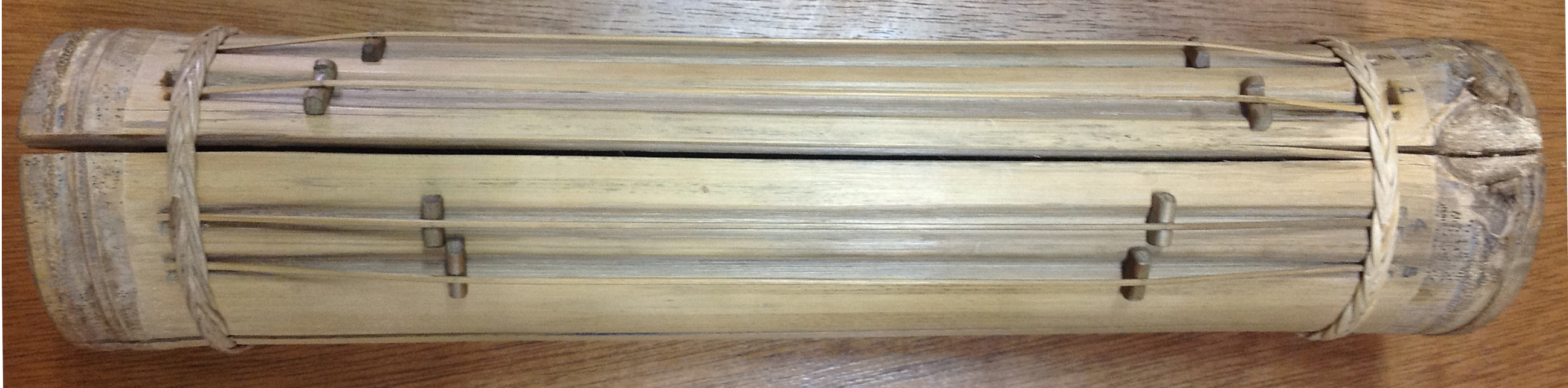
- A kolitong

String instrument
- Other names: kuletong, kulitong (Bontok, Kalinga); kollesing, kulesin, kulising (Ilonggot); killeteng, kulitteng, ohitang, uritang (Isneg); kulibet Kalinga); kaltsang (Ibaloi); kuritang (Ibanag); salorai, saluray, saluroy, saw-ray (Manobo, Ata); sigitan (Subanun), sloray, senday, sluray, (Bilaan, Tagakaolo); s'ludoy (T'boli); takul(Mansaka); tangkew(Agusan Manobo), tangke, tangkel (Tirurai, Maguindanaon), togo(Manobo, Maguindanaon), tangko, tangku(Mangguagan, Diba-bawon), pagang(Palawan)
- Hornbostel–Sachs classification: 312.11 or 312.21 (Whole or half tube zither)

Related instruments
- Takumbo, Valiha, Kulibit, Krem, Karaniing

Kolitong strings
The sound of all six Kolitong strings.

The kolitong is a bamboo polychordal tube zither from Bontok, Kalinga, Philippines with six strings that run parallel to its tube body. The strings are numbered from one to six, from lowest to highest pitch. The body acts as the instrument's resonator. The body may be a whole tube or a half tube. In both cases, the two ends of the body are closed by the bamboo nodes. To help with the resonance of the instrument, holes are made on both nodes and long cracks are made along the body parallel to the strings.

A variety of bamboo tube zithers are found throughout the Philippine archipelago, with each zither differing from the other in name, size, and design, depending on its associated ethnic group. In the Kalinga group, men play the kolitong at night as a solo instrument.

== Polychordal tube zithers ==
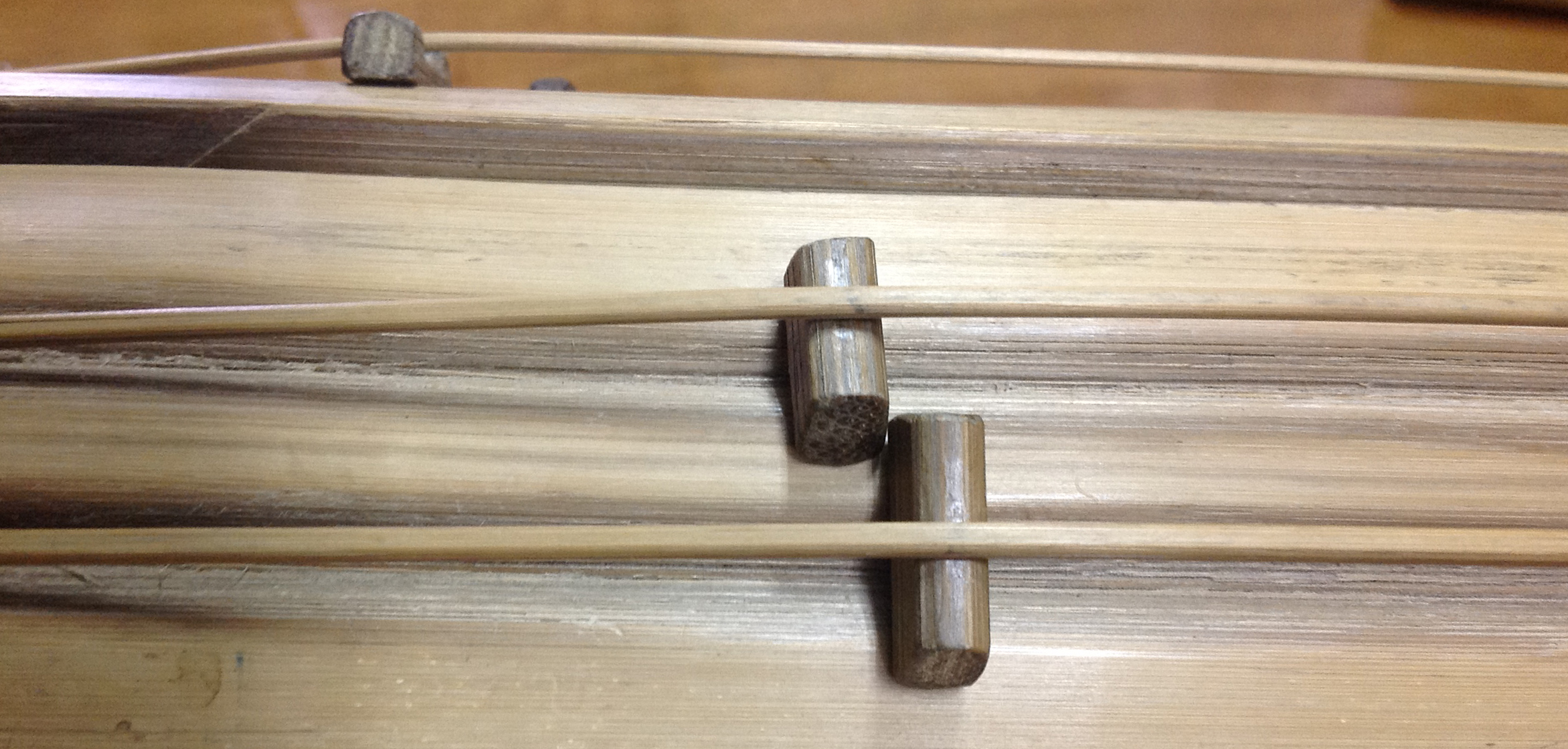
A Kolitong's wooden frets. The frets are moved along the length of the string to adjust the string's pitch.

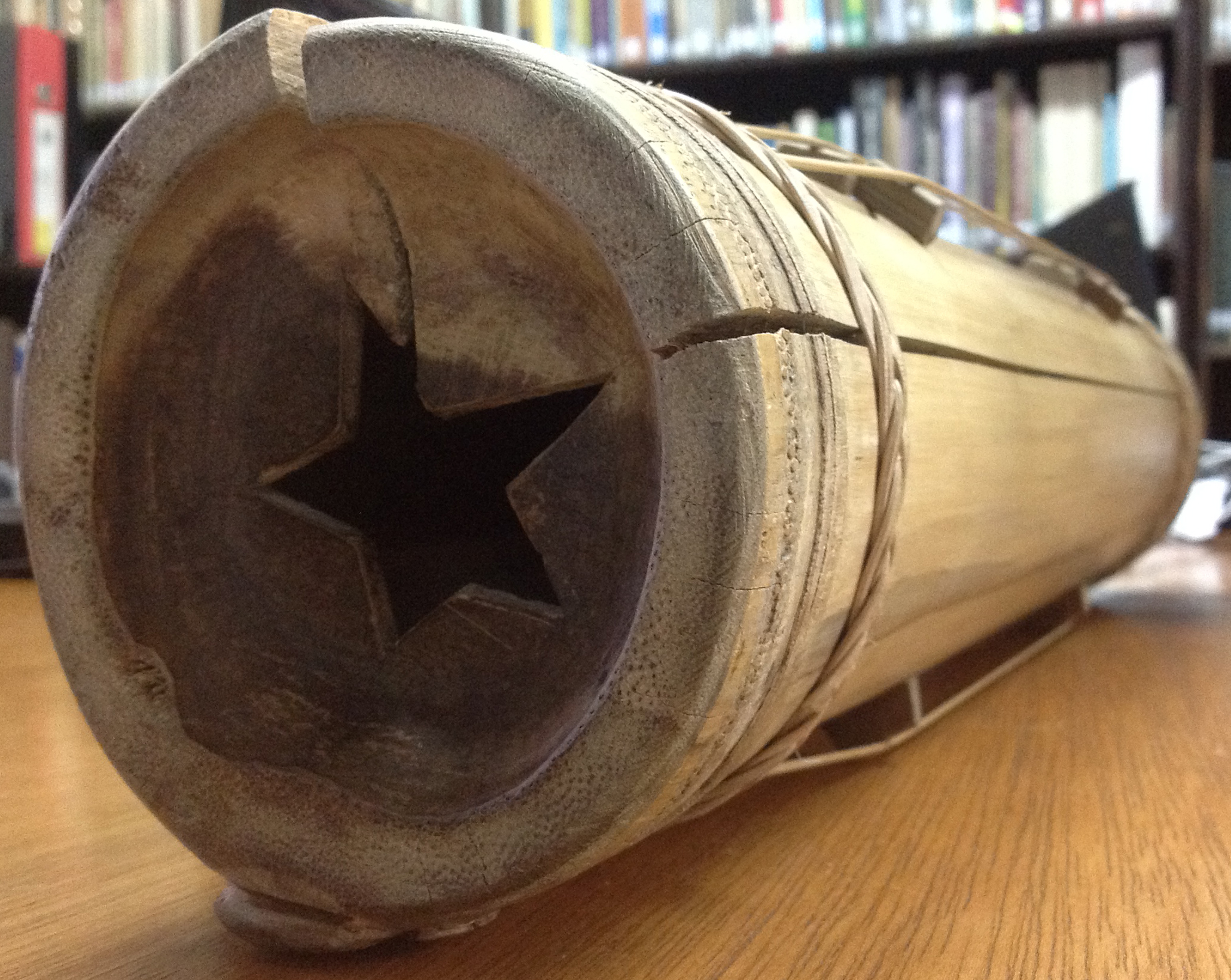
A Kolitong's node. A hole is made on the node to improve the instrument's resonance.

Polychordal tube zithers are widespread in the Philippines. They are found in the Cordilleras and in the Mindanao and Palawan area. The instrument is made from a bamboo tube (approximately 10 cm. in diameter and averaging half a meter long) closed on both ends by nodes, which are partially opened for more resonance. Strings are etched out of the bamboo body and remain attached at both ends. To give the string more tension, two small wooden frets are inserted beneath each strings near the ends. The fret positions determine the pitch of the instrument when plucked. The number of strings vary from five to eight or nine and occasionally up to eleven.

== Playing techniques ==
The strings of the instrument are played mainly by plucking using the player's fingers. In the Kalinga kulibit, two strings on the frontal side are plucked by the thumbs of both hands and four strings on the dorsal side are plucked by the middle and index fingers. The player holds the instrument with both hands and plucks. One end of the instrument is made to rest against the player's lower waist. A continuous melody is formed by the use of alternate fingers of both hands. The Subanon sigitan player plucks the strings and may be joined by another performer who taps a drone on the body of the instrument with two bamboo sticks. The Ilonggot kollesing is played with the instrument being held by a man, while the woman strikes the strings with small bamboo sticks. The Tirurai tangke is played by two women. Using a plectrum, one plucks a drone while the other plucks a melody.

== Instrument variations ==
Polychordal tube zithers in the Philippines vary from place to place. Each instrument is different from the other by size, shape, aesthetic design, and the number of strings. The Kalinga kulibit has six or sometimes eleven strings. The Isneg ohitang has five strings: two in front and three in the back. The Ilonggot kollesing has five or six strings. The Subanon sigitan has five strings. The Tirurai tangke and the Maguindanao tangkel has eight strings. The Manobo tugo has seven strings. The Bukidnon Matigsulug saluray has six strings. The T'boli s'ludoy has five strings.

== See also ==
- Bungkaka
- Diwas
- Gabbang
- Paldong
- Takumbo
