= Northwestern Cagayan General Hospital =

Government hospital in Cagayan, Philippines

- Department of Health

Geography
- Location: Abulug, Cagayan, Cagayan Valley, Philippines

Services
- Beds: 100

History
- Founded: 2022
- Opened: 2024

Links
- Website: nwcgh.doh.gov.ph

The Northwestern Cagayan General Hospital (NWCGH) is a tertiary government hospital in Abulug, Cagayan, Philippines.

== History ==
Construction of the Northwestern Cagayan General Hospital (NWCGH) begun on March 29, 2021. The hospital was institutionalized by Republic Act No. 11718 was signed into law by President Rodrigo Duterte on April 29, 2022 with Cagayan's 2nd district representative Samantha Alfonso authoring the bill filed in the House of Representatives. By February 2024, the NWCGH was partially opened.
