= Budlong =

Budlong may refer to:

== People ==
- Charles A. Budlong (1859–1947), American politician
- Clarence R. Budlong (1874–1946), American tennis player
- Frederick G. Budlong (1881–1953), American bishop
- Robert Davol Budlong (1902–1955), American industrial designer
- S. W. Budlong, American politician in Wisconsin

== Other uses ==
- Budlong Creek, New York, United States
- Budlong Farm, Rhode Island, United States
- Budlong Pickle Company, American pickle company
