= Abulog =

River in north Luzon, Philippines

Abulog River
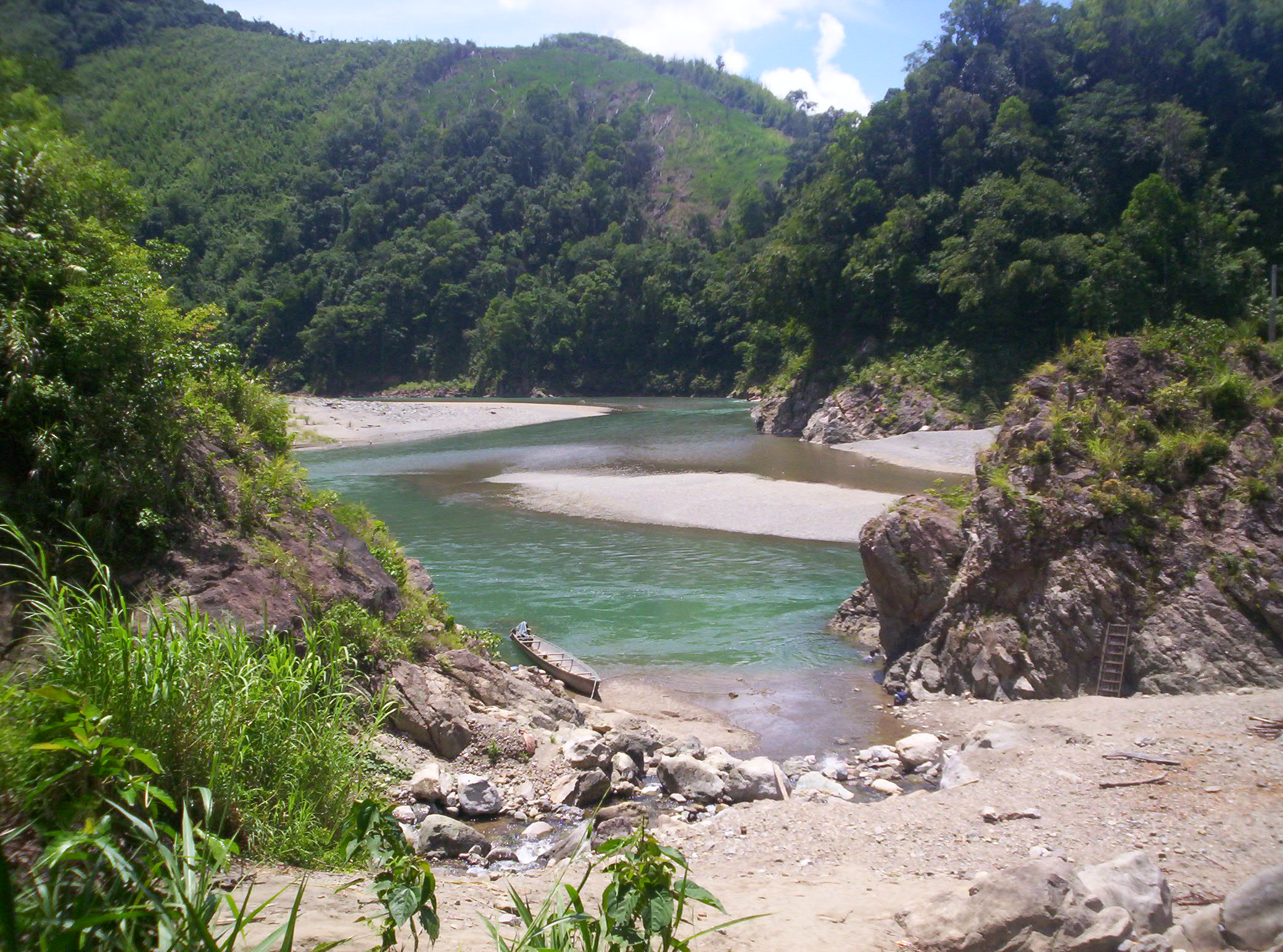
- The river in Dibagat, Kabugao, Apayao.

- Abulog River mouth Abulog (Philippines)

Location
- Country: Philippines
- Region: Cordillera Administrative Region; Cagayan Valley
- Province: Apayao; Cagayan

Physical characteristics
- Source
  - location: Apayao
- Mouth
  - coordinates: 18°27′40″N 121°26′37″E
  - elevation: 0 m (0 ft)
- Length: 196 km (122 mi)
- Basin size: 3,372 km^{2} (1,302 sq mi)
- Discharge
  - location: Babuyan Channel
  - average: 150 m^{3}/s (5,300 cu ft/s)
  - maximum: 4,000 m^{3}/s (140,000 cu ft/s)

The Abulog River or Abulug River is the 9th largest river system in the Philippines in terms of watershed size. It has an estimated drainage area of 3,372 square kilometres (1,302 sq mi) and a length of 196 kilometres (122 mi) from its source in the mountains of Apayao in the Cordillera Administrative Region. More than 90% of the drainage area of the river is located in Apayao province while the remaining, including the mouth of the river, is in Cagayan province.

== Location and basin ==
The river is located in the northern part of Cordillera, along with the Apayao River. The river is part of the Abulog-Apayao basin, which spans at about a 444,500 hectares (1,716 sq mi) size. The upper reaches of the Abulug River, especially upstream from Kabugao, is commonly known as the Apayao River.

== Dam ==
Development plans were proposed for the river, for creating a dam, or more specifically four. The Gened 2 HEPP, the Aoan Dam, the Calanasan dam, and one more unnamed dam. The council still needs to get permission from the Isnag people to construct the dams. The reactions were mixed, with elders liking the project, stating that it will “will uplift the lives of so many generations to come.”

== Use ==
The river is used by many as a fishing spot and a swimming spot. With the river being sacred by many, especially the Isnag people.

== Crossings ==
- Lucban Bridge ( AH 26 (N1) (Pan-Philippine Highway), Abulug, Cagayan)
