= Apayao River =

River in Apayao, Philippines

- Location within Luzon Location within Philippines

Location
- Country: Philippines
- Region: Cordillera Administrative Region; Cagayan Valley
- Province: Apayao; Cagayan

Physical characteristics
- Source
  - location: Apayao, Cordillera Mountains
- Mouth: Abulug River
  - coordinates: 18°08′11″N 121°21′49″E
- Basin size: 3,372 square kilometres (1,302 sq mi)

Basin features
- Progression: Apayao River – Abulug River
- River system: Apayao-Abulug River Basin

The Apayao River is a river on the island of Luzon in the Apayao province of the Philippines. It flows from an extensive watershed in the western slopes of the province, flows past the town of Kabugao and runs into the Pacific Ocean at the coastal town of Abulug. Together with the Abulog River in Cagayan province, the river forms the Apayao-Abulug River Basin, the ninth largest river system in the country.

The river is picturesque through much of its length, and features a number of waterfalls and other features as it runs through the center of the province.

The Isneg, or Apayao, people live along the banks of the Apayao River and its tributaries.

In 2024, the river was included in the yApayaos Biosphere Reserve by UNESCO.

Among the species found in the river is the critically-endangered Asian giant softshell turtle.
