= Diwas =

Philippine bamboo wood instrument

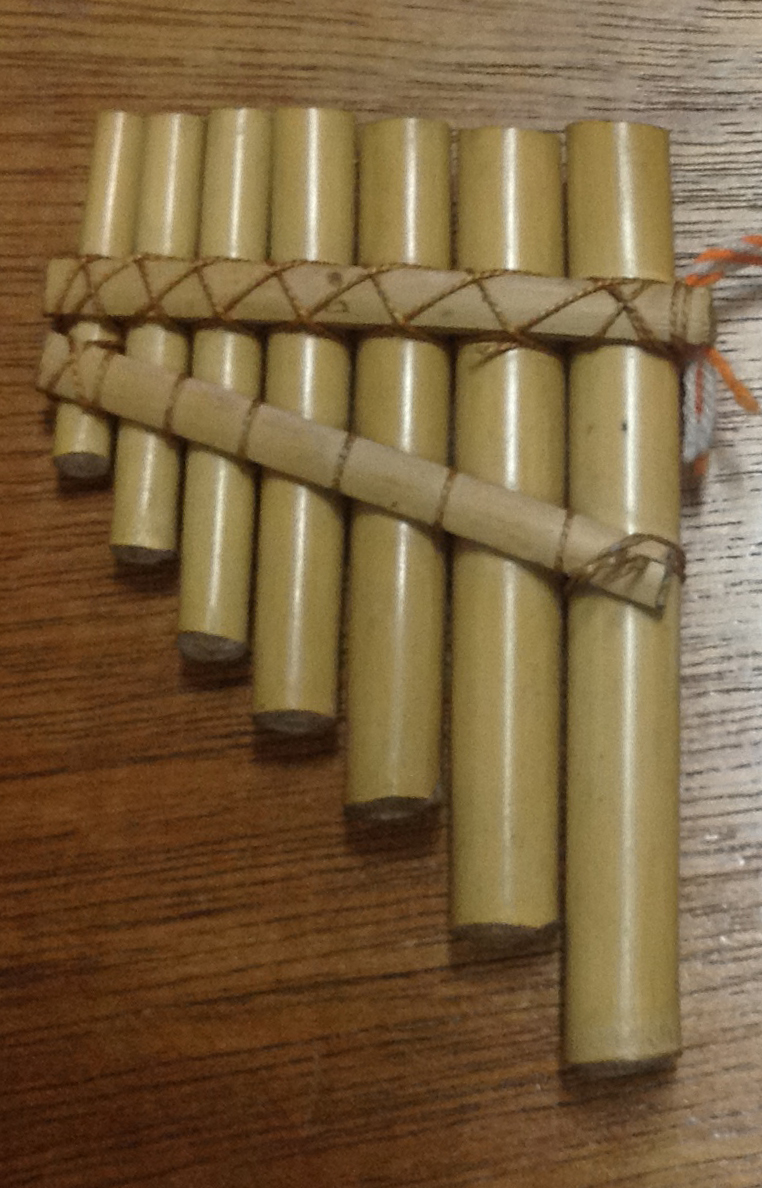
- A diwas from the UP Center of Ethnomusicology

Woodwind instrument
- Other names: Diwdiw-as (Kalinga, Kankanaey); Dad-ayu (Balangaw); Diwdiwas (Bontoc); Saggeypo (Kalinga); Dewdew-as (Tingguian)
- Classification: Wind instrument
- Hornbostel–Sachs classification: 412.112 (Sets of end-blown flutes or panpipes)

Related instruments
- Lip-valley flutes (Paldong), Nose flutes (Tongali)

The Diwas is a native bamboo wind instrument from the Philippines that is a variation of the well-known pan flute or panpipes. It is made of bamboo, with one end closed with bamboo nodes. It does not have finger holes (or tone holes) like other popular aerophones, such as flutes. The Diwas compensates by grouping pipes of graduated lengths together. The player shifts from one pipe to another to produce sounds with varying pitches. In Kalinga, these individual pipes are known as saggeypo, which is why the Diwas is sometimes called saggeypo. The number of attached saggeypos can range from five to eight.

== Playing techniques ==
Diwas
Diwas sound sample. Each pipe in the Diwas was played.

The instrument is played by blowing on the embouchure of the instrument. The embouchure has two distinct sides, but either can be used to play the instrument. When playing on the side with the shorter cut, the instrument produces a higher pitch than when playing on the side with the longer cut.

=== Science behind panpipes ===
How the instrument produces its sound can be explained by the concept of closed-end pipes/tubes. When the player blows on the embouchure, air jets enter the body of the instrument and create vibrations. The slanted cut in the embouchure controls the airflow in the body. The time for this vibration to reach the end of the body and get reflected back determines the frequency produced by the instrument. Therefore, the length of the tube determines the frequency produced by the instrument.

== Instrument variations ==
Most of the variations of the Philippine bamboo panpipes can be traced to northern Luzon, where the instrument is known by different names. In Balangaw, the instrument is called dad-ayu. In Bontoc, it is known as diwdiw-as. In Tingguian, dwdew-as. In Kankanai, diwas. In these variations, the number of pipes ranges from five to eight. The size, length, and radius of the instruments vary from one ethnic group to another, but exact measurements are not required. The aesthetics of the instrument also varies from one group to another.

=== Saggeypo ===
In Kalinga, "saggeypo" and "Diwas" are the same because "saggeypo" refers to the individual pipes of the "Diwas". There is no significant difference in the physical features of the saggeypo and diwas. However, since the diwas is a group of saggeypo strung together, the lengths of the pipe are more fixed. Typically, saggeypo has no fixed length.

== Physical features ==
Production of the Diwas does not depend on exact measurements. This affects the generality of the music in Indigenous peoples of the Philippines. Unlike Western music tradition, which depends largely on musical notes in producing melody, Indigenous music in the Philippines depends highly on rhythm. This is why sizes, length, radius, etc. of instruments in the Philippines have no fixed value where these values are important in producing pitch.

== See also ==
- Bungkaka
- Gabbang
- Kolitong
- Paldong
- Takumbo
