= Gabbang =

Philippine bamboo xylophone

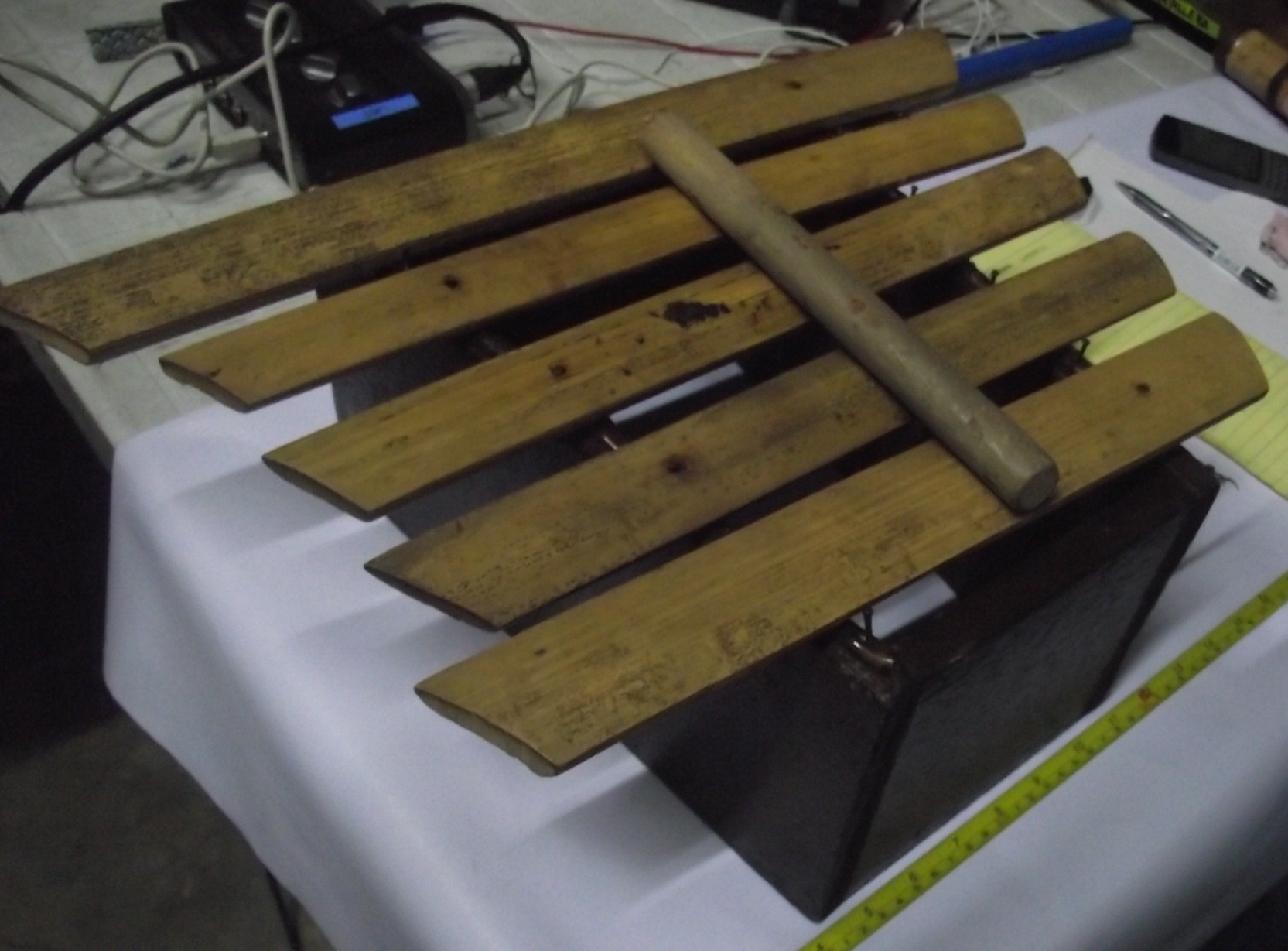
- Gabbang owned by Kontra Gapi

idiophone
- Other names: bamboo xylophone, agung gabbang (Yakan), gambang (Samal), gabbang (Tausug, Palawan)
- Hornbostel–Sachs classification: 111.212

The gabbang, also known as bamboo xylophone, is a musical instrument made of bamboo widely used in southern Philippines. Among the Tausugs and Samas, it is commonly played to accompany songs and dances as a solo instrument or accompanied by the biola.

== Physical features ==
A gabbang consists of a set of trapezoidal bamboo bars of increasing length resting on a resonator. The number of bars varies with the group that made them: Among Yakans, the number ranges from three to nine bamboo bars, but the common agung gabbang has five; among Tausugs, the number ranges from 14 to 22 bamboo bars, but the common gabbang has 12; and in Palawan, the common gabbang has five.

== Playing techniques ==
A bamboo xylophone is played by direct striking using a wooden mallet. The gabbang is played by a pair of beaters while another taps a rhythmic pattern on the side of the box.

== See also ==
- Bungkaka
- Diwas
- Kolitong
- Paldong
- Takumbo
