= Abulug =

Municipality in Cagayan, Philippines

- Municipality
- Municipality of Abulug
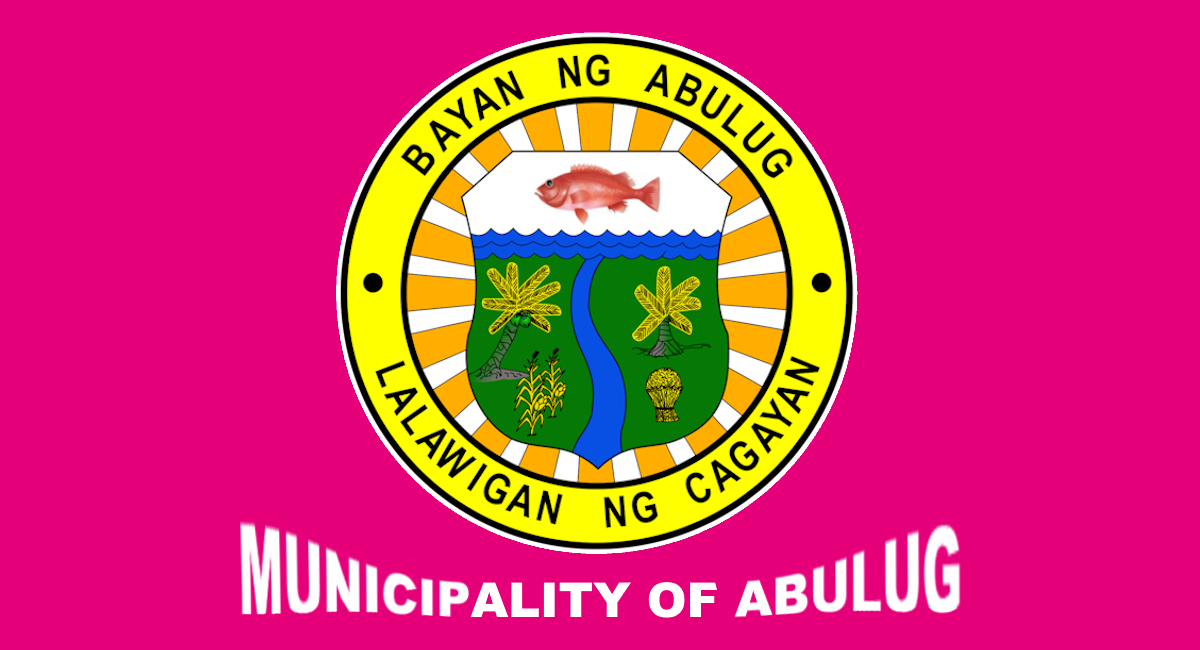
- Flag Seal
- Nicknames: Nipa Haven of the North; Trading Center of Northwestern Cagayan
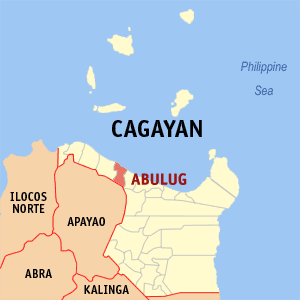
- Map of Cagayan with Abulug highlighted
- Interactive map of Abulug
- Location within the Philippines
- Coordinates: 18°26′39″N 121°27′27″E
- Country: Philippines
- Region: Cagayan Valley
- Province: Cagayan
- District: 2nd district
- Barangays: 20 (see Barangays)

Government
  - Type: Sangguniang Bayan
  - Mayor: Jesus Florencio A. Vargas
  - Vice Mayor: Karry Ann M. Guillermo
  - Representative: Baby Aline Vargas-Alfonso
  - Electorate: 21,113 voters (2025)

Area
  - Total: 162.60 km^{2} (62.78 sq mi)
- Elevation: 3.0 m (9.8 ft)
- Highest elevation: 39 m (128 ft)
- Lowest elevation: 0 m (0 ft)

Population (2024 census)
  - Total: 35,347
  - Density: 217.39/km^{2} (563.03/sq mi)
  - Households: 8,165

Economy
  - Income class: 2nd municipal income class
  - Poverty incidence: 8.94% (2023)
  - Revenue: ▲PHP 129,899,901.10 (2019)
  - Assets: ₱ 685.7 million (2024)
  - Expenditure: ₱ 179.3 million (2024)
  - Liabilities: ₱ 193.9 million (2024)

Service provider
  - Electricity: Cagayan 2 Electric Cooperative (CAGELCO 2)
- Time zone: UTC+8 (PST)
- ZIP code: 3517
- PSGC: 0201501000
- IDD : area code: +63 (0)78
- Native languages: Ilocano; Ibanag; Atta; Tagalog

Abulug (Ibanag: Ili nat Abulug; Ilocano: Ili ti Abulug; Tagalog: Bayan ng Abulug), officially the Municipality of Abulug, is a municipality in the province of Cagayan , Philippines. According to the 2024 census, it has a population of 35,347 people.

== History ==
Abulug was officially established as a Spanish mission in 1596. Originally called Tular, the name Abulug became commonly used after 1629.

The town became the base of Spanish expeditions against the unconquered Isneg tribes of Apayao. Since its founding, the town has had to change its location thrice, primarily due to the frequently changing course of the Abulog river.

During the 1818 Spanish census, Abulug had 1,162 native families living in harmony with 1 Spanish-Filipino clan.

== Geography ==
Abulug is situated 128.06 kilometres (79.57 mi) from the provincial capital Tuguegarao, and 613.21 kilometres (381.03 mi) from the country's capital city of Manila.

=== Barangays ===
Abulug is politically subdivided into 20 barangays.Each barangay consists of puroks while some have sitios.

In 1957, barrio Colonia was renamed to Libertad.

- Alinunu
- Bagu
- Banguian
- Calog Norte
- Calog Sur
- Canayun
- Centro (Poblacion)
- Dana-Ili
- Guiddam
- Libertad
- Lucban
- Pinili
- Santa Filomena
- Santo Tomas
- Siguiran
- Simayung
- Sirit
- San Agustin
- San Julian
- Santa Rosa

=== Climate ===
Climate data for Abulug, Cagayan
Month	Jan	Feb	Mar	Apr	May	Jun	Jul	Aug	Sep	Oct	Nov	Dec	Year
Mean daily maximum °C (°F)	25 (77)	26 (79)	29 (84)	31 (88)	31 (88)	31 (88)	30 (86)	30 (86)	30 (86)	28 (82)	27 (81)	25 (77)	29 (84)
Mean daily minimum °C (°F)	20 (68)	20 (68)	21 (70)	23 (73)	24 (75)	25 (77)	25 (77)	25 (77)	24 (75)	23 (73)	23 (73)	21 (70)	23 (73)
Average precipitation mm (inches)	120 (4.7)	77 (3.0)	62 (2.4)	40 (1.6)	118 (4.6)	138 (5.4)	162 (6.4)	173 (6.8)	143 (5.6)	198 (7.8)	185 (7.3)	248 (9.8)	1,664 (65.4)
Average rainy days	16.9	12.2	11.5	10.6	18.7	20.1	21.2	23.3	20.8	16.9	16.5	20.0	208.7
Source: Meteoblue

== Demographics ==
Population census of Abulug
Year	Pop.	±% p.a.
1903	8,329	—
1918	6,459	−1.68%
1939	10,929	+2.54%
1948	11,433	+0.50%
1960	14,458	+1.98%
1970	19,206	+2.88%
1975	21,293	+2.09%
1980	23,916	+2.35%
1990	24,562	+0.27%
1995	23,548	−0.79%
2000	26,683	+2.72%
2007	28,769	+1.04%
2010	30,675	+2.36%
2015	32,497	+1.10%
2020	34,579	+1.32%
2024	35,347	+0.53%
Source: Philippine Statistics Authority

In the 2024 census, the population of Abulug was 35,347 people, with a density of 220 inhabitants per square kilometre or 570 inhabitants per square mile.

== Economy ==
Poverty incidence of Abulug (%)

Source: Philippine Statistics Authority

Abulug is potential for commercial activities. It is located in northwestern part of Cagayan. The town particularly the area of Jct. Luna is the gateway to Apayao province.

Many commercial establishments are now in the municipality such as: agricultural and construction supplies, banks, bookstores, drug stores, pawnshops, groceries, bakeries, car companies, hotels, boutiques, restaurants, convenience stores, shopping centers, appliance centers, review and training centers, courier companies and others.

== Government ==
Government officials in the provincial level are voted by the electorates of the town. The provincial government has political jurisdiction over local transactions of the municipal government.

The municipality is governed by a mayor, designated as its local chief executive, and by a municipal council as its legislative body in accordance with the Local Government Code. The mayor, vice mayor, and the councilors are elected directly by the people through an election which is being held every three years.

Barangays are also headed by elected officials: Barangay Captain, Barangay Council, whose members are called Barangay Councilors. The barangays have SK federation which represents the barangay, headed by SK chairperson and whose members are called SK councilors. All officials are also elected every three years.

The Abulug government center transferred to Barangay Libertad following a municipal resolution that re-designated the government center from its previous location in Barangay Centro.

=== Elected officials ===
Members of the Municipal Council (2025–2028)
Position	Name
Congressman	Baby Aline Vargas-Alfonso
Mayor	Manny Vargas
Vice-Mayor	Jeff Vargas
Councilors	Karry Ann M. Guillermo
Councilors	Plong Vargas
Councilors	Precy vargas
Councilors	Carlo Vinagrera
Councilors	Myrlen P. Umblas
Councilors	Bob Cabagui
Councilors	Ely De San Jose
Councilors	Boleng Montenegro

=== Congress representation ===
Abulug, belonging to the second legislative district of the province of Cagayan, is represented by Baby Aline Vargas-Alfonso in the house of representatives.

== Healthcare ==
- Apayao-Cagayan Medical Center (ACMC).
- Northwestern Cagayan General Hospital (NWCGH) is a government-owned tertiary hospital. It was established by virtue of Republic Act No. 11718 approved on April 23, 2022 by President Rodrigo Duterte through the initiative of Rep. Samantha Louise Vargas Alfonso. The NWCGH is located along National Highway, Pinili, Abulug, Cagayan.
- Abulug Municipal Hospital
- Fungayao Specialty
- Butala Ophthalmology Clinic

== Tourism ==
- New Abulug Municipal Hall - located at Municipal Government Center, Libertad.
- Lucban Bridge - is the seventh longest bridge in the Philippines. The bridge has a length of 825 825 m (2,707 ft), consists of 12 spans with 436.9 m (1,433 ft) in total length approaches.
- St. Thomas Parish Church
- Immaculate Conception Parish Church
- Miraculous Image of Santa Rosa de Lima
- Rio de Abulug/Abulug River
- Sta. Rosa Dragon Fruit Plantations
- Wine Making Industry
- Abulug River Park

== Education ==
The Schools Division of Cagayan governs the town's public education system. The division office is a field office of the DepEd in Cagayan Valley region. The Abulug Schools District Office governs the public and private elementary and high schools throughout the municipality.

=== Primary and elementary schools ===
- Abulug Central Elementary School
- Alinunu Elementary School
- Bagu Elementary School
- Banguian Elementary School
- Calog Norte Elementary School
- Calog Sur Elementary School
- Canayun Elementary School
- Dana-ili Elementary School
- Dugo Elementary School
- F. L. Vargas College - Elementary Department
- Guiddam Elementary School
- Libertad Elementary School
- Lucban Elementary School
- Macugay Elementary School
- Muru Elementary School
- Pinaron Elementary School
- Pinili Elementary School
- San Agustin Elementary School
- San Julian Elementary School
- Santa Filomena Elementary School
- Santa Rosa Elementary School
- Santo Tomas Elementary School
- Sawang Elementary School
- Sirit Elementary School
- Tayak Elementary School

=== Secondary schools ===
- Abulug School of Fisheries
- Abulug National Rural and Vocational High School
- Divine Word High School - Dana-ili
- F.L. Vargas College - High School Department
- Libertad National High School
- Lyceum of Abulug

=== Technical school ===
- TESDA Abulug

=== Higher educational institution ===
- F.L. Vargas College - Abulug Campus

== Notable personalities ==
- Jeth Troy U. Rosario – basketball player
- Jamiko Allan "Miko" Sabbun Manguba – musician
