= Budlong Pickle Company =

American company

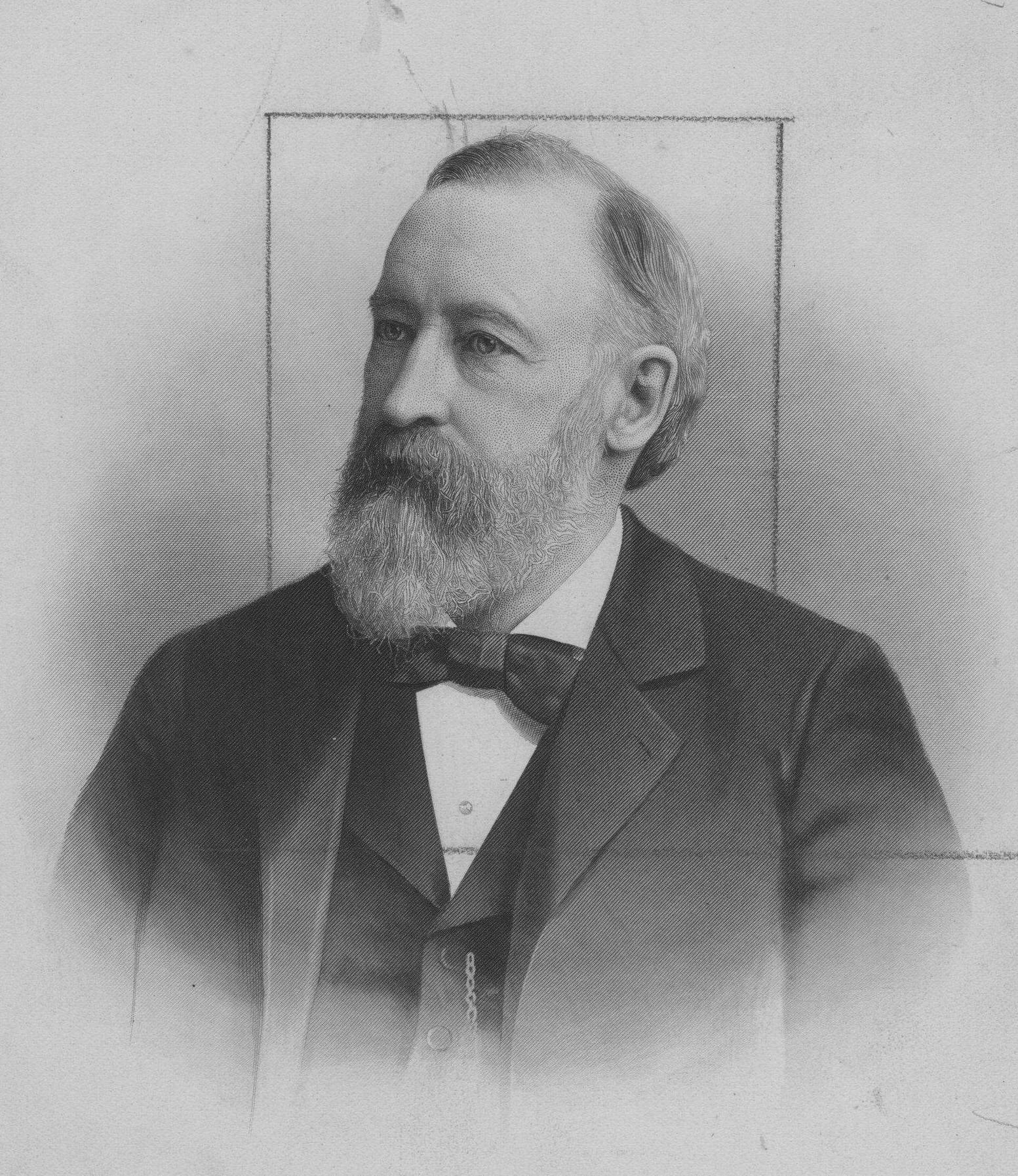
Lyman A. Budlong, founder of Budlong Pickle Company. Collection of the Chicago Public Library.

The Budlong Pickle Company was an American company based in Chicago that made and marketed pickles from its own cucumbers. Founded in the late 1850s, it was sold in 1958 to a company which was later acquired by Dean Foods. The Budlong pickle legacy has recently been revived as the namesake of a restaurant chain in Chicago called "The Budlong Hot Chicken".

== Background ==
In the 19th century, Chicago was a powerhouse of American agriculture. The Union Stock Yards was the center of American meatpacking, and the Chicago Board of Trade provided financial support for investment in agricultural commodities.

In addition to its dominance in meatpacking and the grain trade, Chicago was a center of American pickle industry in the late 19th century. Among the reasons for Chicago's pickle prominence were ample supplies of salt and a robust rail infrastructure.

The Budlong family, an old Rhode Island family and the namesake of Budlong Farm, were established farmers and picklers on the East Coast, with a large operation in Cranston, Rhode Island.

== Early history ==
In the late 1850s, Lyman A. Budlong (1829–1909) started a large farm in Chicago—in an area now named Budlong Woods—called the Budlong Nursery. Dates of the Nursery's establishment vary, but it must have been in 1857, the year that Lyman first came to Chicago, or later.

The Nursery, nicknamed the "village of glass" after its many greenhouses, produced large quantities of cucumbers, onions, and other vegetables. It also grew flowers. Approximately 700 acres (2.8 km^{2}) in size, the center of the farm was at what is now the intersection of California and Foster Avenues in the Budlong Woods section of Chicago's Lincoln Square community area.

The Budlong Pickle Company, founded in 1857 or 1859, was initially part of the same enterprise as the Nursery. In 1903, the Chicago Sunday Tribune called Budlong's the largest pickle farm in the world; as of 1928, the Tribune called "one of the largest pickle factories in the world". It sold approximately 100,000 bushels of pickled cucumbers per year during the late 19th century. In 1899, Joseph J. Budlong—Lyman's brother—patented a vegetable sorting device "particularly applicable to the sorting or grading of pickles according to size".

The factory was located at the intersection of Lincoln and Berwyn avenues, and a special "pickle train" ran on the Chicago and North Western line to pick up its employees. The farm employed a number of laborers who had immigrated to the United States from central and eastern Europe. As of 1903, workers earned an average of $1.25 per day, or approximately $45 today; some earned as little as 25 cents, or around $9.

The Nursery property was a golf course by the late 1920s, but the Pickle Company continued operations thereafter. Lyman Budlong had reportedly made at least $1.5 million (approximately equivalent to $53,750,000 in 2025) from the Nursery as of his death c. November 1909.

== Mid-century and sale ==
George L. Hathaway was Budlong's longtime president. In 1945, Hathaway was presented with an award by the National Pickle Packers Association for demonstrating "outstanding fairness … in procuring pickles for the armed forces".

Budlong had operations in Columbia, Mississippi, as of 1936; and in Ora, Indiana, as of 1940.

In 1958, it merged with a Green Bay, Wisconsin–based food company specializing in pickles, which was later acquired by Dean Foods (now part of Dairy Farmers of America).

== Legacy ==
Although the Nursery and Pickle Company no longer exist, a Chicago-based restaurant has taken on the Budlong name. The Budlong Hot Chicken was founded in 2015 by restaurateur Jared Leonard and currently has 5 stores in Chicago.

The Budlong name also survives in the Lyman A. Budlong Public School, and Budlong Woods, a part of the Lincoln Square community area.
