= Butting =

Butting may refer to:

- Max Butting (1888–1976), German composer
- Head butting, an attack using the head
- Butting Group, German manufacturer
