= Budlong Creek =

Location
- Country: United States
- State: New York

Physical characteristics
- Mouth: Mohawk River
  - location: Utica, New York
  - coordinates: 43°05′55″N 75°09′58″W
  - elevation: 402 ft (123 m)
- Basin size: 3.21 mi^{2} (8.3 km^{2})

The Budlong Creek flows into the Mohawk River near Utica, New York.
