= Apayao =

Province in Cordillera, Philippines

- Province
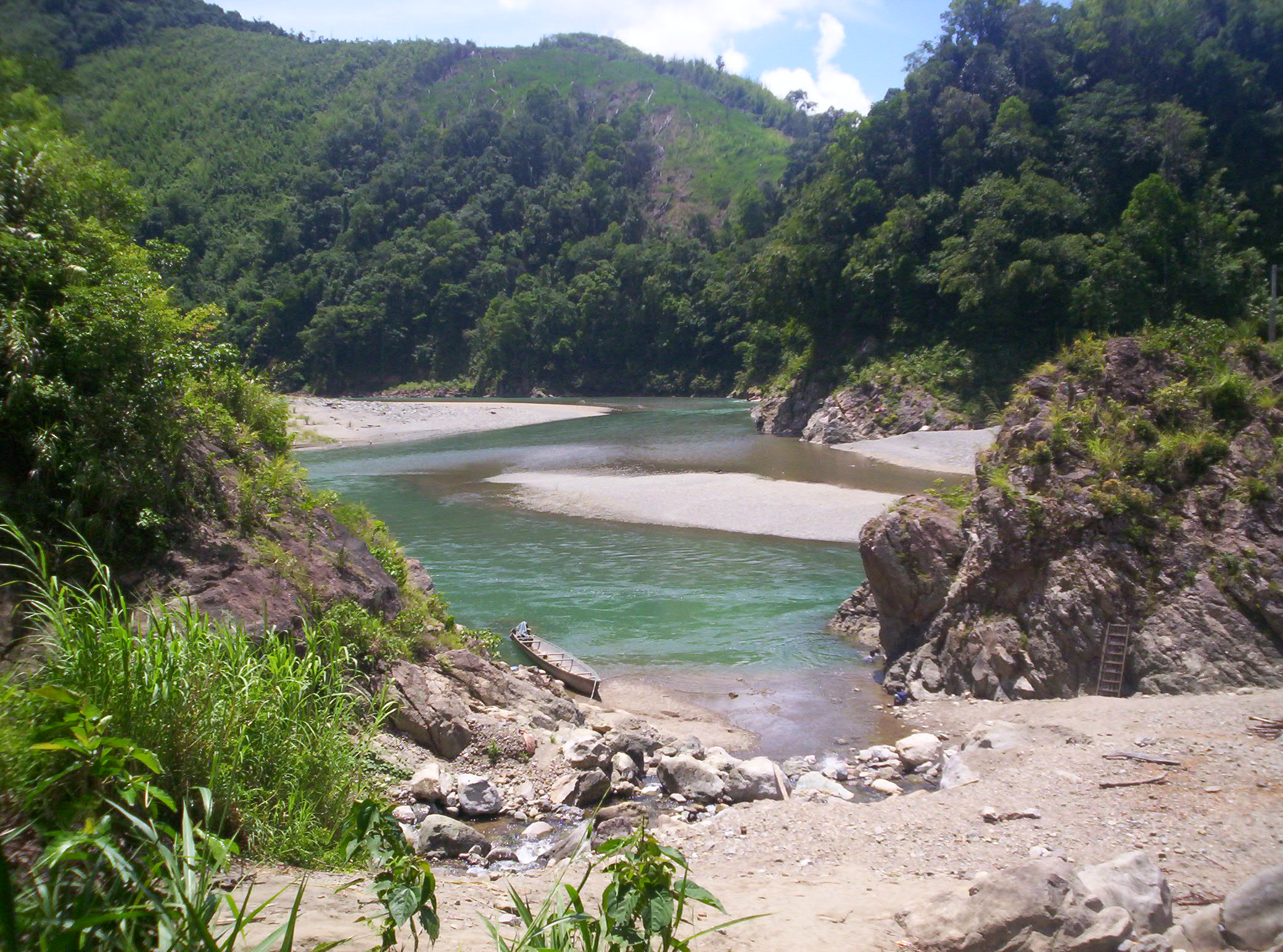
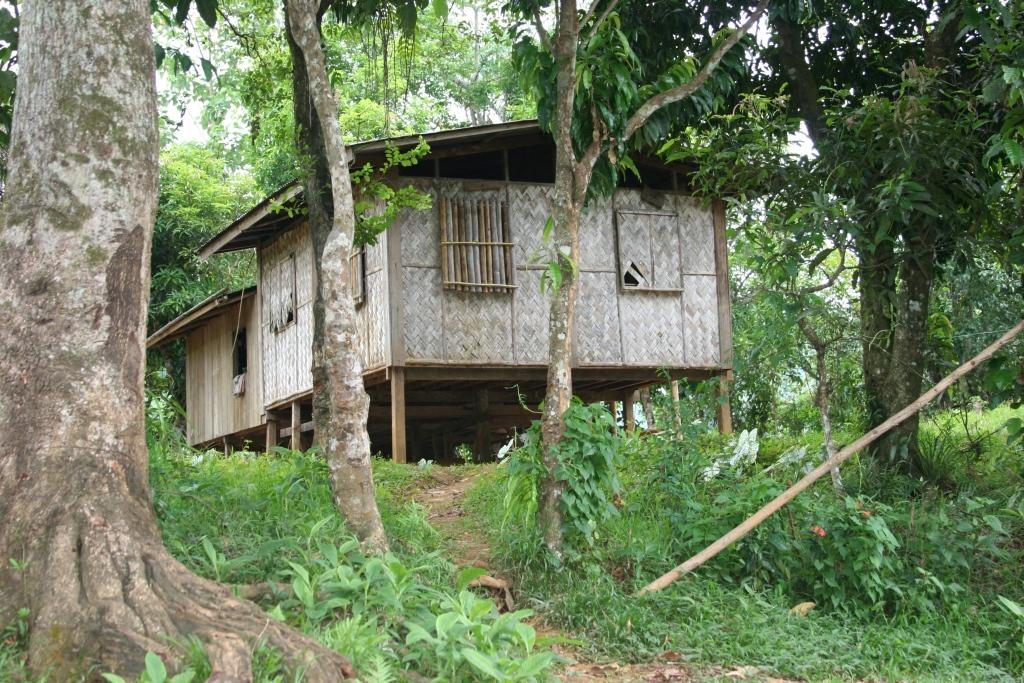
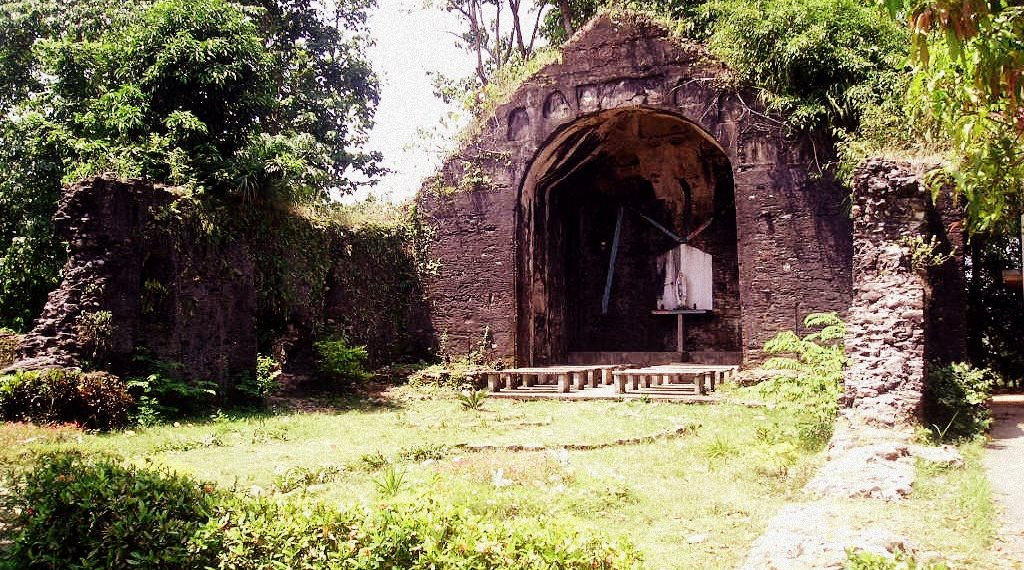
- (from top: left to right) Abulog River in Kabugao, Dibagat home and Pudtol church ruins.

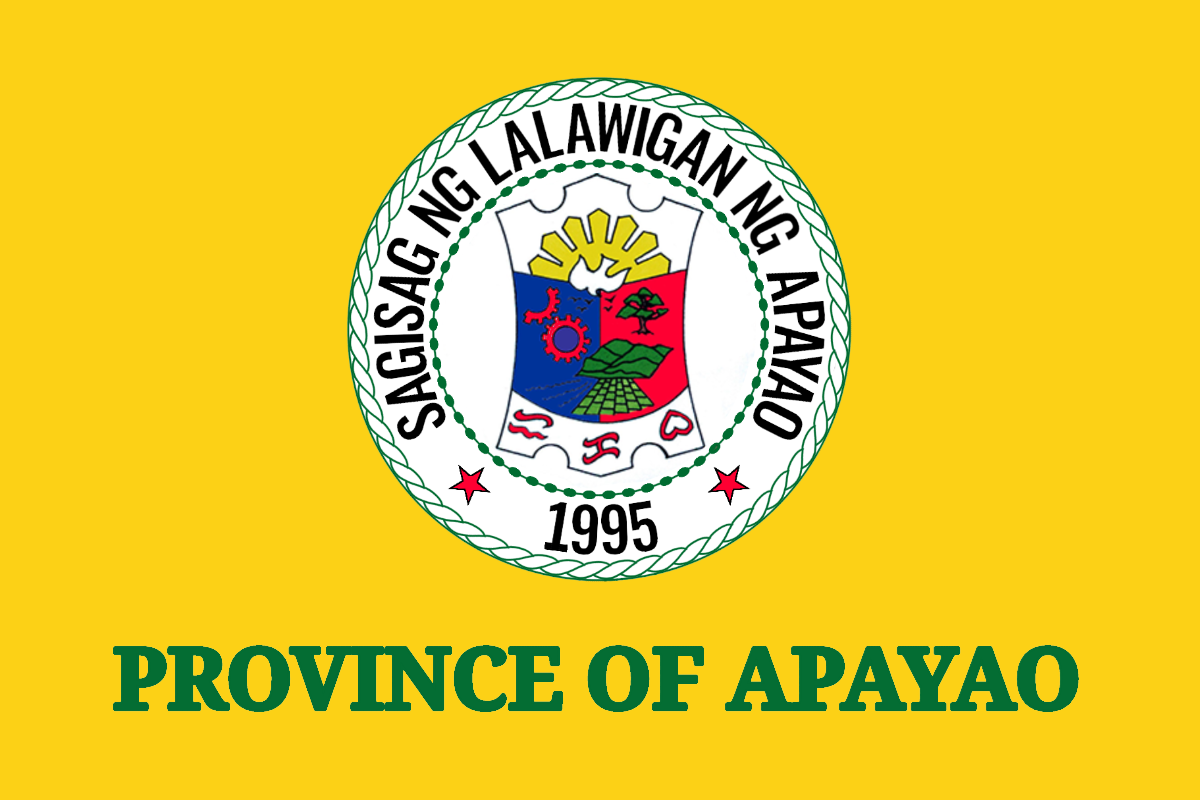
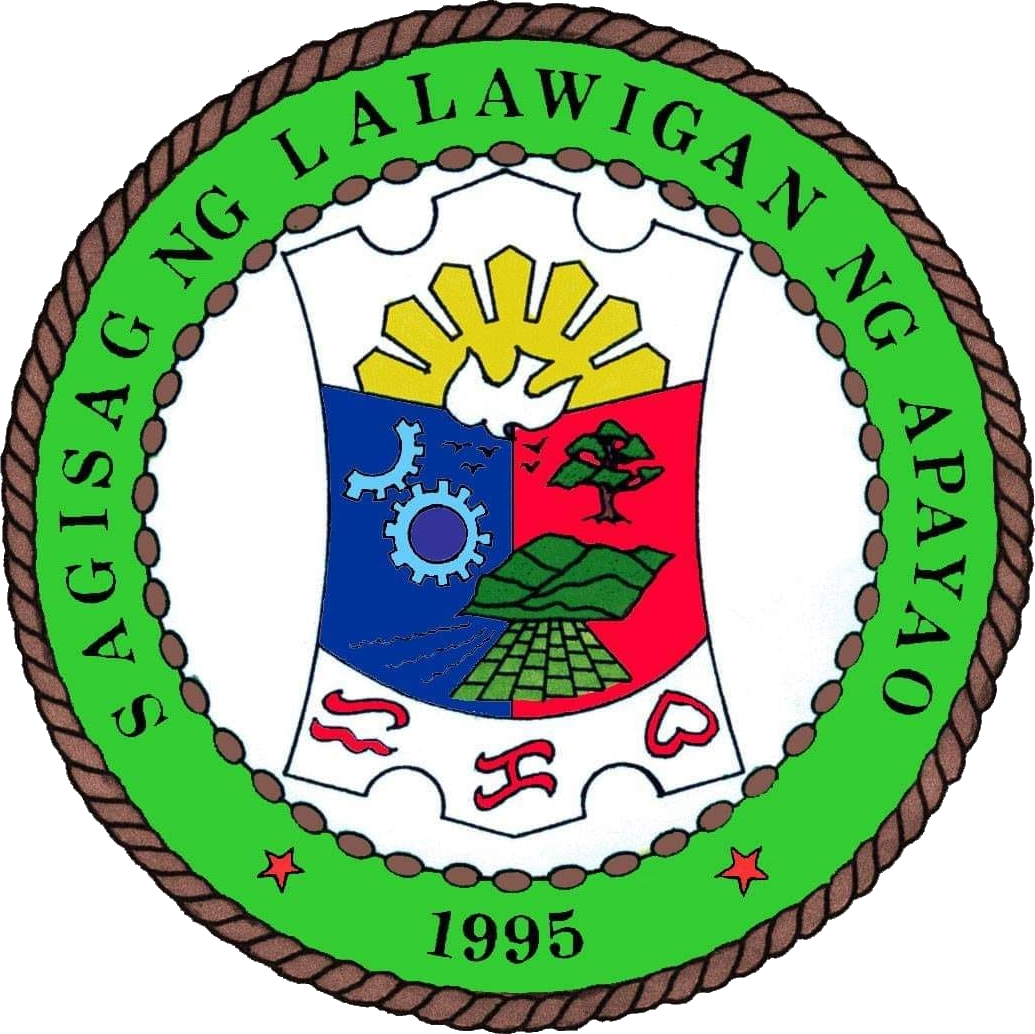
- Flag Seal

- Location in the Philippines
- Interactive map of Apayao
- Coordinates: 17°45′N 121°15′E
- Country: Philippines
- Region: Cordillera Administrative Region
- Founded: May 8, 1995
- Capital: Kabugao
- Government seat: Luna (Note: Kabugao is the officially recognized capital, although the province carries out many of its operations in a new government center established in Luna.)
- Largest municipality: Conner

Government
  - Governor: Elias C. Bulut Jr. (NPC)
  - Vice Governor: Kyle Mariah Chelsea S. Bulut-Cunan (Lakas)
  - Representative: Eleanor Begtang
  - Legislature: Apayao Provincial Board
  - Electorate: 83,441 voters (2025)

Area
  - Total: 4,413.35 km^{2} (1,704.00 sq mi)
  - Rank: 27th out of 82
- Highest elevation (Mount Lungod): 1,921 m (6,302 ft)

Population (2024 census)
  - Total: 126,587
  - Rank: 78th out of 82
  - Density: 28.6827/km^{2} (74.2880/sq mi)
  - Rank: 81st out of 82
  - Households: 28,862
- Demonyms: Apayaoan; Apayaoense

Divisions
  - Independent cities: 0
  - Component cities: 0
  - Municipalities: 7: Calanasan; Conner; Flora; Kabugao; Luna; Pudtol; Santa Marcela
  - Barangays: 133
  - Districts: Legislative district of Apayao

Economy
  - Income class: 2nd provincial income class
  - Poverty incidence: 4% (2023)
  - Revenue: ₱ 1,920 million (2024)
  - Assets: ₱ 6,463 million (2024)
  - Expenditure: ₱ 1,166 million (2024)
  - Liabilities: ₱ 561.4 million (2024)
- Time zone: UTC+8 (PHT)
- PSGC: 148100000
- IDD : area code: +63 (0)74
- ISO 3166 code: PH-APA
- Spoken languages: Ilocano; Isnag (Ymandaya; Imallod; Dibagat-kabugao); Tagalog; English
- Website: www.apayao.gov.ph

Apayao, officially the Province of Apayao, (Note: Ilocano: Probinsia ti Apayao; Itawit: Provinsiya ya Apayao; Isnag: Provinsia nga Apayao; Tagalog: Lalawigan ng Apayao) is a landlocked province in the Philippines in the Cordillera Administrative Region in Luzon. Kabugao serves as its capital. The provincial capitol and its associated offices are located at the New Government Center in Luna.

The province borders Cagayan to the north and east, Abra and Ilocos Norte to the west, and Kalinga to the south. Prior to 1995, Kalinga and Apayao comprised a single province named Kalinga-Apayao, which was partitioned to better service the needs of individual ethnic groups.

With a population of 126,587 (as of the 2024 census) covering an area of 4,413.35 square kilometres (1,704.00 sq mi), Apayao is the least densely-populated province in the Philippines, the least developed province in Luzon and one of the poorest.

== History ==
By the 20th century, Apayao is predominated by the Isneg people. They are located primarily in the highland municipalities of Kabugao and Calanasan. Majority of them live in scattered settlements along the upper reaches of the Apayao-Abulug River; while some along a major tributary of the Matalag River in Conner.

=== Spanish colonial era ===
Although Apayao which was then part of Cagayan, was among the earliest areas penetrated by the Spaniards in the Cordilleras, the region, inhabited by the Isneg tribe, remained largely outside Spanish control until late in the 19th century. As early as 1610, the Dominican friars established a mission in what is now the town of Pudtol. In 1684, the friars again made attempts to convert the people and established a church in what is now Kabugao.

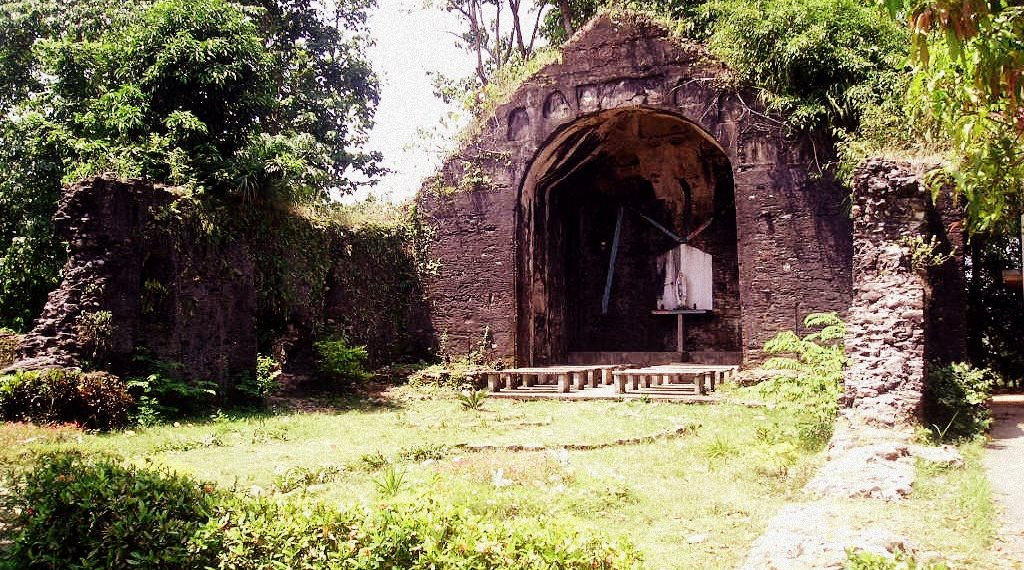
Ruins of Pudtol Church, built in 1684 by the Dominicans and abandoned in 1815

The Spanish authorities were then able to establish in Cagayan the comandancias of Apayao and Cabugaoan in 1891, which covered the western and eastern portions of what is now Apayao. The comandancias, however, failed to bring total control and the Spanish government only maintained a loose hold over the area.

=== American colonial era ===
Apayao was established through Act No. 1642 on May 9, 1907, as a sub-province of Cagayan province.

The Americans established the Mountain Province on August 13, 1908, with the enactment of Act No. 1876. Apayao was incorporated; and along with Amburayan, Benguet, Bontoc, Ifugao, Kalinga, and Lepanto, became sub-provinces of this new province.

In the early years, the sub-province underwent series of territorial changes:

- Part of Apayao was transferred to the province of Ilocos Norte (Executive Order 21, 1920).
- 1922: A barrio of municipal district of Bayag (now Calanasan) was transferred to Namaltugan.
- 1927: Parts of the municipal district of Pinukpuk in Kalinga were annexed to Conner.
- Through EO 200, approved on September 6, 1929, barrios in Tauit were organized into a separate municipal district, Luna, effective October 1.
- Through EO 13, approved on January 21, 1936, Tauit was abolished and was annexed as a single barrio to Luna, effective February 1.
- Through EO 78, approved on December 23, 1936, Namaltugan was abolished and was annexed to Bayag and Kabugao, effective January 1, 1937.

In the early years, Apayao as a sub-province was divided into seven municipal districts, all Isneg predominated.

While the Isneg clashed with the Philippine Constabulary in the early years, the families attempted to escape the area and go into the mountains of Ilocos Norte and Abra. They were involved in an attack in Tauit in 1913.

=== Japanese occupation ===
In 1942, Japanese Imperial forces entered Apayao, starting a three-year occupation of the province during the Second World War. Local Filipino troops and the military forces of the 11th and 66th Infantry Regiment, Philippine Commonwealth Army, USAFIP-NL, supported by the Cordilleran guerrillas, drove out the Japanese in 1945.

During the Second World War, Kabugao was occupied for a year by the Japanese; an Isneg guerilla force was organized under a United States Army captain who had escaped the Fall of Bataan. Little fighting occurred in the sub-province, but a number of Isneg fought with the American and Filipino forces in the Cagayan Valley and in the neighboring areas. The war and the post-war era seen development among the Isnegs, although slowly.

=== Postwar Era ===
==== Kalinga-Apayao creation and splitting ====
On June 18, 1966, the huge Mountain Province was split into four provinces with the enactment of Republic Act No. 4695. The four provinces were Benguet, Bontoc (renamed "Mountain Province"), Kalinga-Apayao and Ifugao. Kalinga-Apayao, along with Ifugao, became one of the provinces of the Cagayan Valley region in 1972.

=== Martial law era ===
The beginning months of the 1970s marked a period of turmoil and change in the Philippines, as well as in Kalinga-Apayao. During his bid to be the first Philippine president to be re-elected for a second term, Ferdinand Marcos launched an unprecedented number of foreign debt-funded public works projects. This caused the Philippine economy took a sudden downwards turn known as the 1969 Philippine balance of payments crisis, which in turn led to a period of economic difficulty and social unrest.

With only a year left in his last constitutionally allowed term as president Ferdinand Marcos placed the Philippines under Martial Law in September 1972 and thus retained the position for fourteen more years. This period in Philippine history is remembered for the Marcos administration's record of human rights abuses, particularly targeting political opponents, student activists, journalists, religious workers, farmers, and others who fought against the Marcos dictatorship. The Kalinga-Apayao became known as a flashpoint of conflict between the Marcos dictatorship and the various indigenous peoples who lived in the area, because of the Chico River Dam Project, which, even if only the most essential part of it were built, would have submerged numerous townships in Kalinga, Mountain Province, and Apayao; and would have displaced about 100,000 indigenous people. Marcos sent three armed brigades to subdue protests, resulting in heightened tensions in the area.

Apayao was deeply affected by events that took place in its sister sub-province of Kalinga, as well as the neighboring provinces of Abra and Mountain Province (Bontoc, including the struggle against the Chico Dam Project, the struggle against the encroachment on indigenous lands of logging company Cellophil Resources Corporation owned by Marcos crony Herminio Disini, and the rise of multiple armed Cordilleran autonomy movements.

=== After the People Power Revolution ===
After Marcos was finally deposed by the civilian-led People Power Revolution in 1986, many of the activists who had joined the underground movement decided to "surface," as the new administration of Corazon Aquino released political prisoners and initiated peace talks. However, anti-left sentiment in Aquino's new cabinet, which included figures who had sided with the Reform the Armed Forces Movement, made the peace process difficult, and negotiations eventually collapsed, and the insurgency in Kalinga-Apayao persisted.

Another event in 1986 marked the beginning of political change in the region, however - the splitting of the Cordillera People's Liberation Army from the New People's Army. Former Catholic priest Conrado Balweg, who had left his calling and joined the NPA in 1979, had been having disagreements with the NPA leadership over tactics and objectives in the Cordillera for four years when he finally decided to split from the NPA in early April 1986, believing that Igorot interests were better served through regional struggles for liberation, rather than the national-scale conflict pursued by the NPA. Either way, this set the stage for negotiations which would eventually lead to the creation of the Cordillera Administrative Region, and Apayao as an independent province within it.

=== Peace accord and creation of the Cordillera Administrative Region creation ===
In September 1986, the CPLA signed the Mount Data Peace Accord with the government, which led to the creation of what became called the Cordillera Autonomous Region, although attempts to ratify actual autonomy in the region have failed due to non-ratification during plebiscites.

The Cordillera Administrative Region was established on July 15, 1987, and Kalinga-Apayao was made one of its provinces.

=== Separation of Kalinga and Apayao provinces ===
Finally, on February 14, 1995, Kalinga-Apayao was split into two independent provinces with the passage of Republic Act No. 7878.

== Geography ==
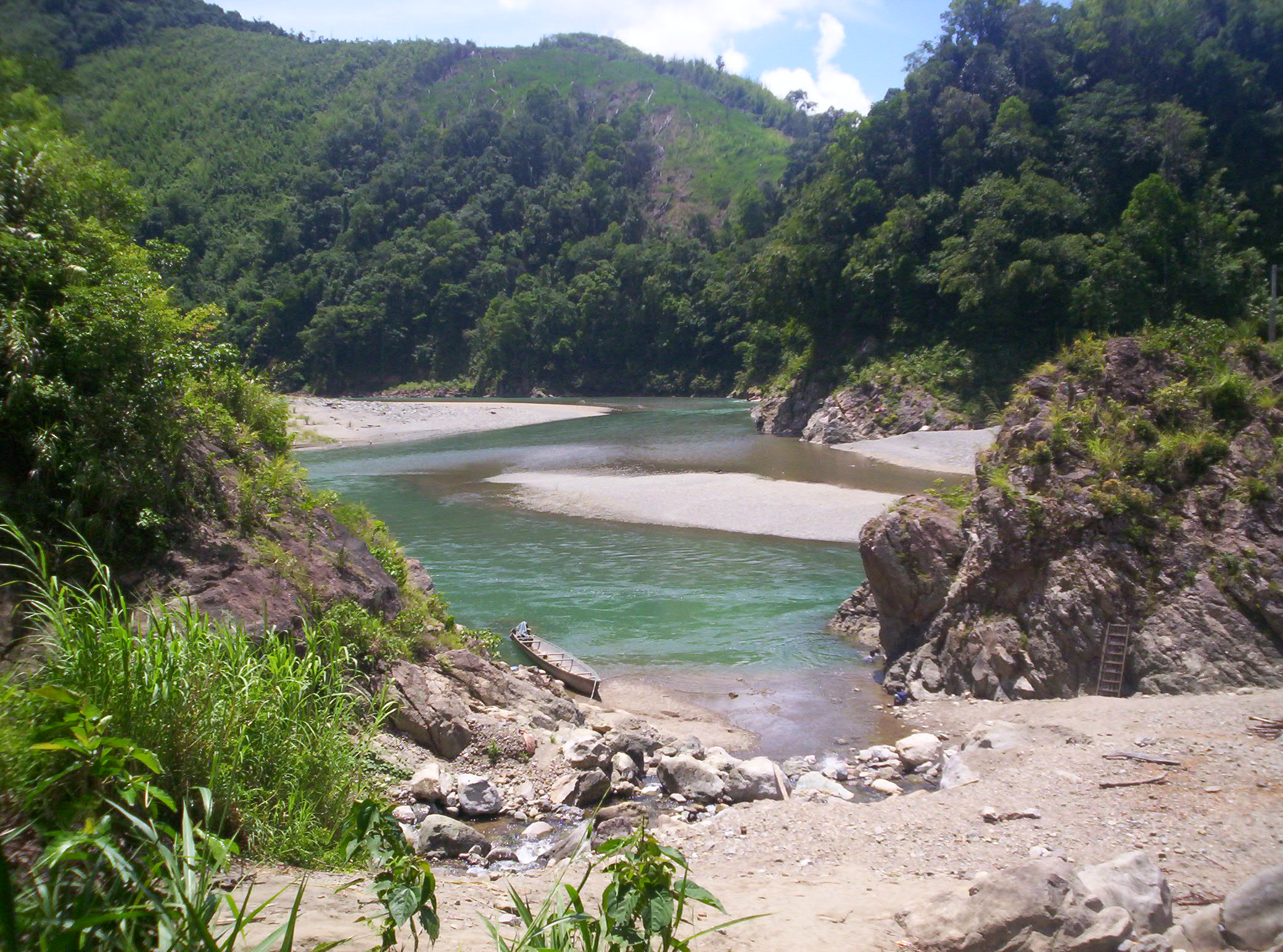
Dibagat River in Kabugao

Apayao is basically situated within the Cordillera Central mountains, traversed by many rivers. The province covers an area of 4,413.35 square kilometres (1,704.00 sq mi) forming the northern tip of the Cordillera Administrative Region, and is bounded on the north and east by Cagayan, west by Ilocos Norte, southwest by Abra and south by Kalinga.

The province is geographically subdivided into Upper Apayao (composed of the upland municipalities: Calanasan, Conner and Kabugao) and Lower Apayao (the lowland municipalities: Luna, Pudtol, Flora and Sta. Marcela).

Plains and valleys are used for farming. Apayao is basically composed of farmlands.

=== Climate ===
The prevailing climate in the province falls under Corona's Type III Classification. It is characterized by relatively dry and wet seasons, from November to April, and wet during the rest of the year. Heaviest rain during December to February while the month of May is the warmest.

=== Biodiversity ===
Apayao is biologically diverse. The province is sanctuary to 139 bird species, 61 of which are endemic and 4 threatened. It also has 43 species of wild food plants eaten by the indigenous people and 50 species of medicinal plants. The province is home to critically endangered rufous hornbills, lawaan or dipterocarp trees, Raflesia flowers, and the white-winged flying fox.

The Philippine Eagle Foundation began its search of eagles in Apayao in 2011 after reports of huge eagles were roaming the area for centuries. On March 22, 2013, scientists discovered the stronghold of critically endangered Philippine eagles, the country's national bird, in Luzon island within the vicinity of the Calanasan Lowland Forest. In January 2015, the town of Calanasan initiated a program which protected 3,000 hectares of forests under its jurisdiction. Additionally, the province of Apayao is one of the very few in the country that has an approved forest land use plan (FLUP). The first active Philippine eagle nest in Apayao was discovered in July 2015.

==== Biosphere reserve ====
On 9 July 2018, the provincial government of Apayao announced their intent for the province to be a UNESCO Biosphere Reserve. The province, which possesses more than 286,000 hectares of virgin forests, also noted that they have sent four of their personnel to train in the United States under the US Foreign Service to hasten the declaration of the site. On January 16, 2019, the provincial government announced that they were doing "legwork for the inscription."

In July 2024, UNESCO, in the International Coordinating Council of the Man and the Biosphere Programme (ICC MAB) 36th session at Agadir, Morocco, listed Apayao's 3,960 square kilometers lush forest areas, with Apayao River, a Biosphere Reserve, making it the fourth biosphere reserve in the country.

=== Administrative divisions ===
Apayao comprises 7 municipalities, all encompassed by a lone legislative district.

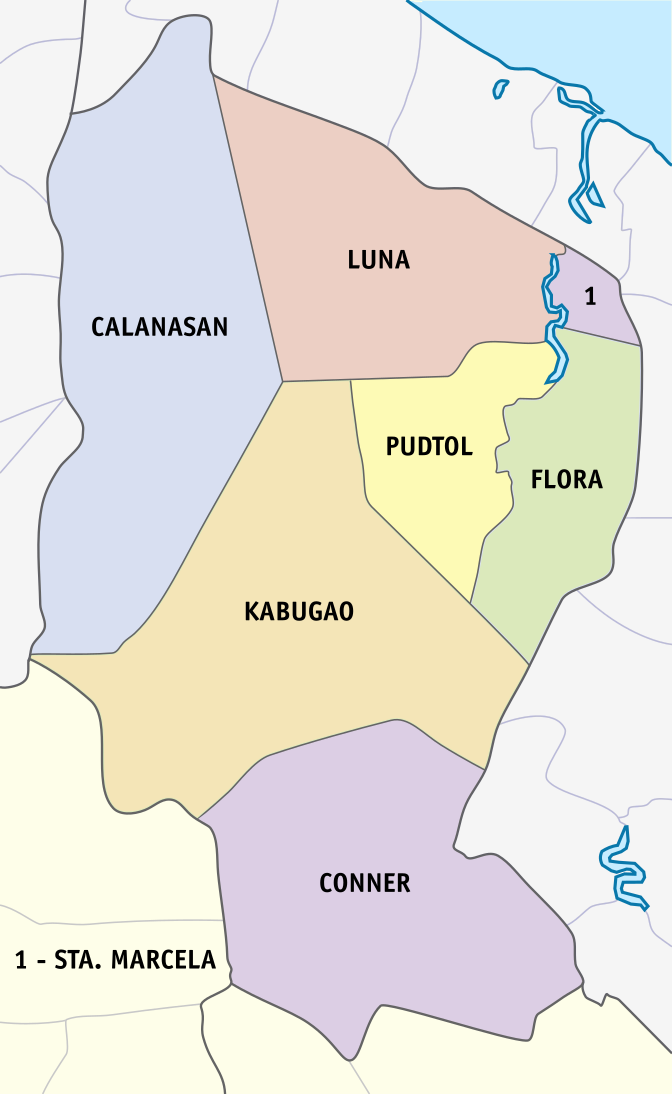
Political divisions

Municipality (Note: The globe icon marks the town center.)		Population			±% p.a.	Area		Density		Barangay
		(2020)		(2015		km^{2}	sq mi	/km^{2}	/sq mi	
Calanasan		10.1%	12,550	12,604	−0.08%	1,256.15	485.00	10.0	26	18
Conner		22.2%	27,552	26,051	+1.07%	694.30	268.07	40	100	21
Flora		14.4%	17,944	17,391	+0.60%	413.38	159.61	43	110	16
Kabugao	†	13.0%	16,215	15,537	+0.82%	935.12	361.05	17	44	21
Luna		17.1%	21,297	19,063	+2.13%	606.04	233.99	35	91	22
Pudtol		12.5%	15,491	14,925	+0.71%	401.02	154.83	39	100	22
Santa Marcela		10.7%	13,317	13,613	−0.42%	196.32	75.80	68	180	13
Total			124,366	119,184	+0.81%	4,413.35	1,704.00	28	73	133
	† Provincial capital					Municipality				

=== Barangays ===
The 7 municipalities of the province comprise a total of 133 barangays, with Barangay Malama in Conner as the most populous in 2015, and Eleazar in Calanasan as the least.

== Demographics ==
Population by ethnicity (2000)
Ethnicity	Number
Ilocano	49,328 (50.82%)
Isnag	29,071 (29.95%)
Malaueg	3,580 (3.69%)
Itneg	3,380 (3.48%)
Kalinga	2,992 (3.08%)
Kankanaey	1,208 (1.24%)
Bontoc	1,014 (1.04%)
Ibaloi	979 (1.01%)
Others	4,931 (5.08%)
Not Reported	575 (0.59%)

The population of Apayao in the 2024 census was 126,587 people, with a density of 29 inhabitants per square kilometre or 75 inhabitants per square mile.

Population census of Apayao

Year	Pop.	±% p.a.
1918	9,787	—
1939	15,614	+2.25%
1948	19,357	+2.42%
1960	29,601	+3.60%
1970	49,652	+5.30%

Year	Pop.	±% p.a.
1975	61,115	+4.25%
1980	70,681	+2.95%
1990	74,720	+0.56%
1995	83,660	+2.14%
2000	97,129	+3.25%

Year	Pop.	±% p.a.
2007	103,633	+0.90%
2010	112,636	+3.08%
2015	119,184	+1.08%
2020	124,366	+0.90%
2024	126,587	+0.43%

Source: Philippine Statistics Authority

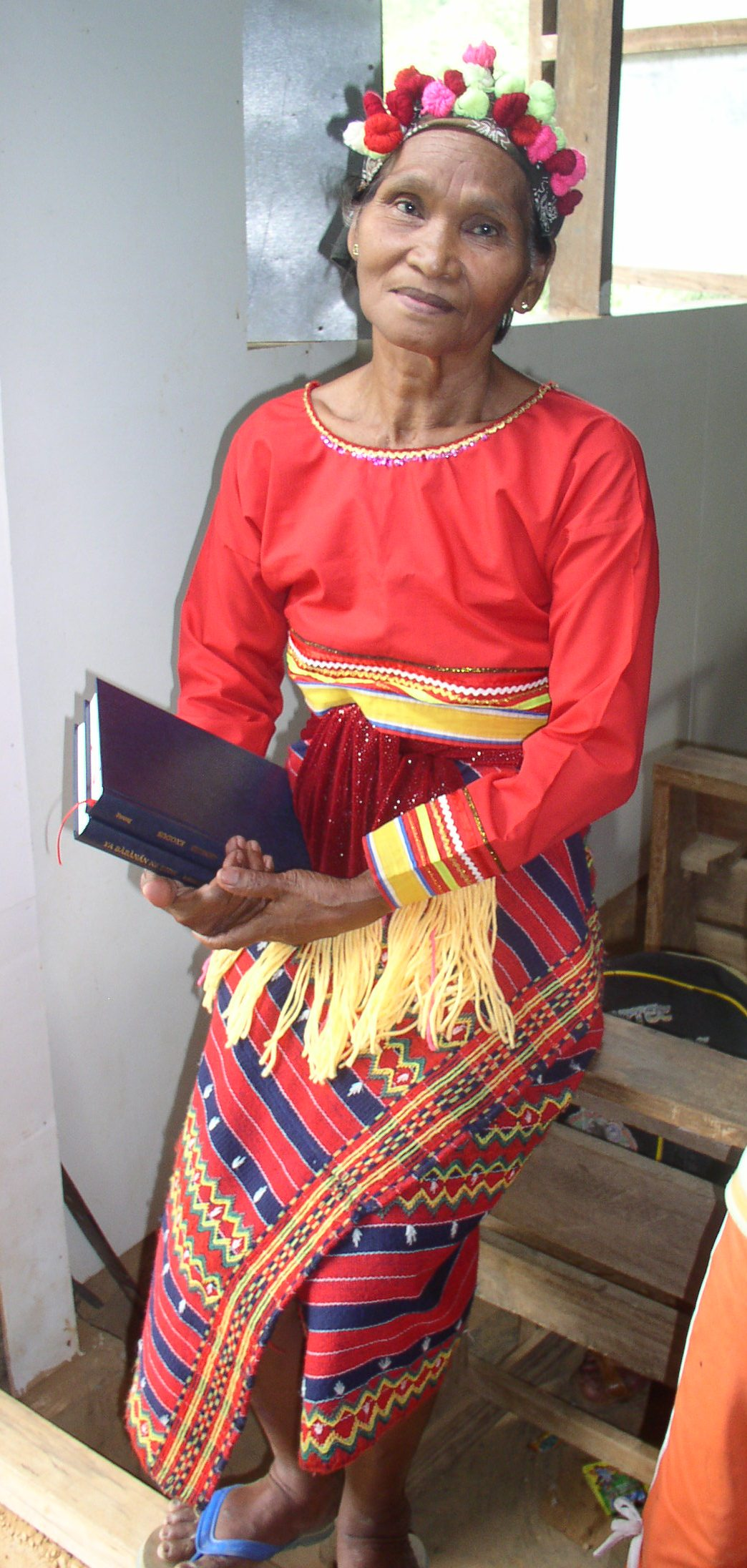
The Isnag people were the first inhabitants of Apayao. Their numbers were eventually overtaken by the Ilokano people who migrated under the orders of then president Marcos, making the Isnag a minority in their ancestral lands.

Based on the 2000 census survey, Ilocanos comprised 49,328 (50.82%) of the total provincial population of 97,058, while almost 1/3 of the population were Isnag at 29,071 (29.95%). Other ethnic groups in the province were the Malaueg at 3,580 (3.69%), Itneg at 3,380 (3.48%), Kalinga at 2,992 (3.08%), Kankanaey at 1,208 (1.24%), Bontoc at 1,014 (1.04%), and Ibaloi at 979 (1.01%).

=== Languages ===
The main languages of Apayao are Ilocano and Isnag.

== Economy ==
Poverty incidence of Apayao (%)

Source: Philippine Statistics Authority

Apayao is devoted to agricultural production, particularly food and industrial crops such as palay, corn, coffee, root crops and vegetables. Fruits produced include lanzones, citrus, bananas and pineapples, durian, santol, rambutan, coconut and mangosteen. Rice production totaled 98,489 metric tons in 2011. Parts of Apayao are home to rice terraces.

Economic activity is also based on livestock and poultry breeding such as swine, carabao, cattle, goat and sheep. Other additional investment includes manufacturing, food processing, furniture, crafts and house wares making.

Updated records of the Department of Trade and Industry Provincial Office reveal that existing industries in the province are furniture, garment craft, food processing, gifts and house wares, and agricultural support.

The people of Apayao also have a rich tradition of basket, handicraft, and textile weaving.

== Government ==
Current Provincial Government Officials (2025-2028)

- Governor: Elias C. Bulut Jr. (NPC)
- Vice-Governor: Kyle Mariah Chelsea S. Bulut-Cunan (Lakas)

Sangguniang Panlalawigan Members:

1st District:

- Alison T. Betat (NPC)
- Rosario B. Labueng (NPC)
- Samuela A. Agnas-Real (Lakas)
- Vicent S. Talattag (NPC)
- Girlie B. Laylay-uy (Lakas)

2nd District:

- Josephine M. Bangsil (NPC)
- Mailah Haylee L. Ballesteros (Lakas)
- Hector Reuel D. Pascua (NPC)
- Ricky A. Laoat (Lakas)
- Vic F. Maruquin (Lakas)

Ex-Officio Members:

- Marcia Valiente (President, LNB)
- TBD (President, PCL)
- Hanz Gerald Palacay (President, Panlalawigang Pederasyon ng Sangguniang Kabataan)
- John Anthony Amid (Representative, IPMR)

=== House of Representatives ===
District	Representative	Party	Term	Bloc
Lone	Eleanor B. Begtang	NPC	2	Majority

== Tauit ==
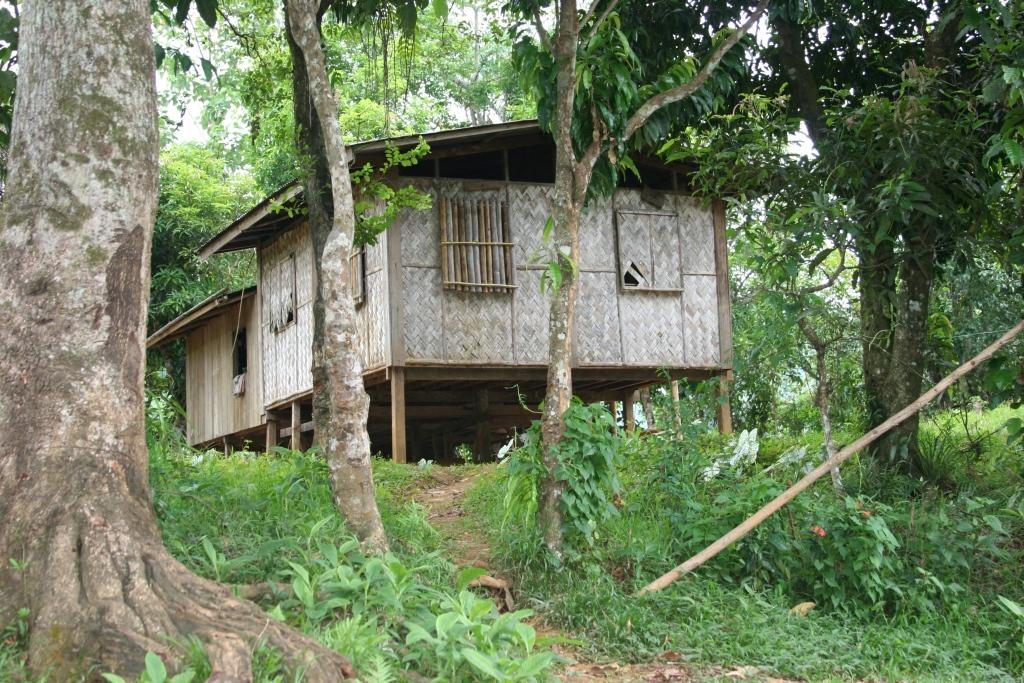
Native Dibagat homes

Tauit (or Tawit), an Isneg settlement along the lower Apayao-Abulug River, was a former municipal district and Apayao's first sub-provincial capital (1907–1915) until the capital was moved to Kabugao in August 1915 by virtue of Executive Order No. 45. It had been existed by the time of creation of the sub-province of Apayao.

Tauit is said to be the forerunner of the present-day Pudtol. Its seat of government at Barrio Tawit was later divided into four barangays in the municipality.

In 1913, a band of Isneg attacked Tauit, as they were infuriated by the large number of Ilocano settling in the territory under the protection of the local government.

In 1926, Allacapan was founded as its municipal district. In July 1927, the area was separated from Tauit and was organized into an independent one with the same name by virtue of EO No. 68. It was ceded to the province of Cagayan in 1928.

In 1929, a separate municipal district taken from Tauit, Macatel (later renamed Luna through a resolution), was organized through EO No. 200.

Difficulties in transportation led to the decision to abandon Tauit as a municipal district and to be represented by Luna.

Tauit was abolished through EO No. 13, issued on January 21, 1936, and effective February 1, with remaining territories annexed as a single barrio to Luna. These territories were established as the municipal district of Pudtol upon its creation on December 3, 1956, through EO No. 217.

Parts of the territories of Pudtol and Luna were later established as the municipalities of Flora and Santa Marcela; meanwhile, Tauit also comprised some parts of Lasam in Cagayan. At present, remnants of Tauit are located in northeastern Apayao and in few parts of Cagayan.
