= Bungkaka =

Philippine percussion instrument

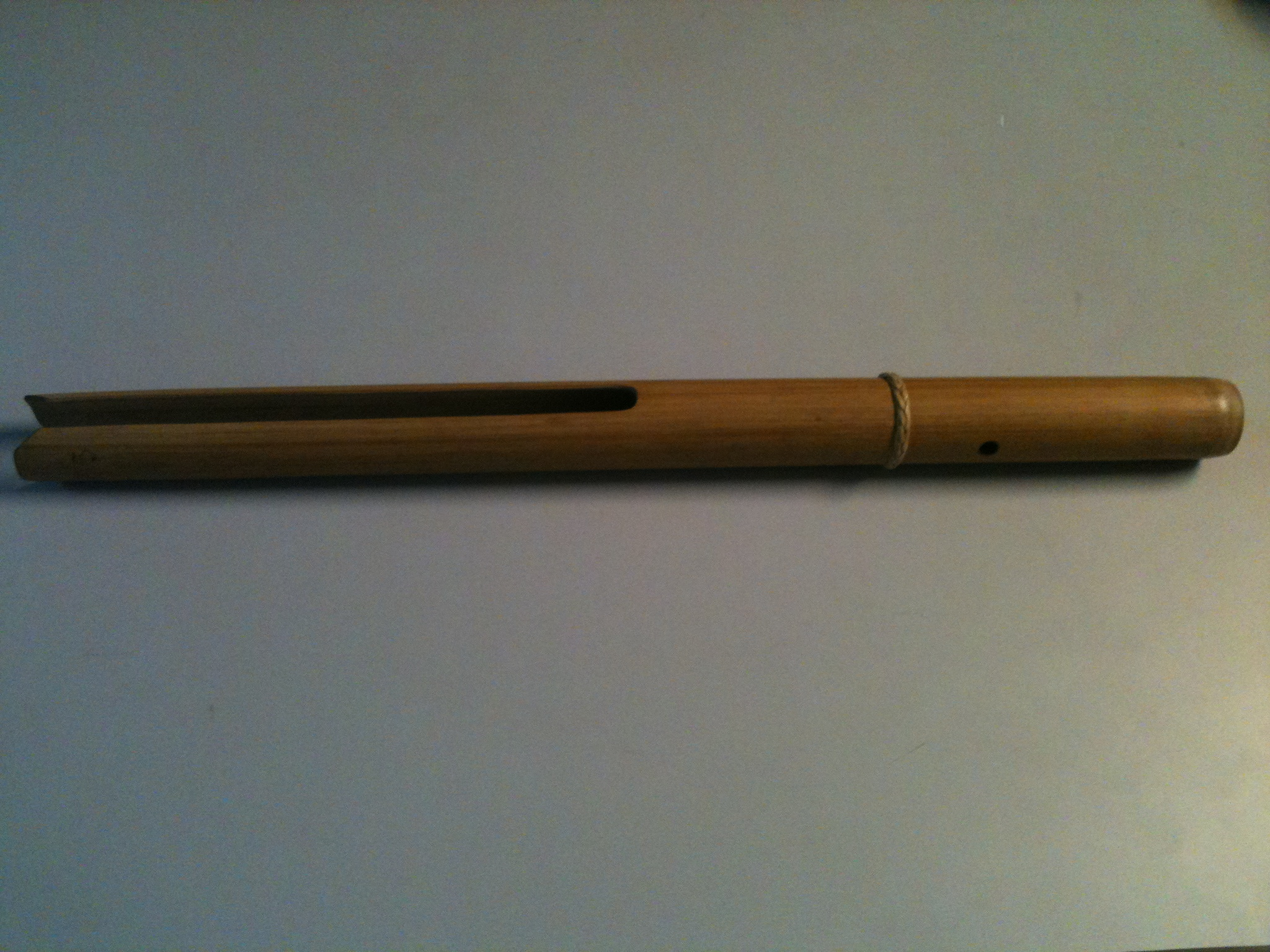

idiophone
- Other names: bamboo buzzer, avakao (Bontok), balingbing, ubbeng (Kalinga), pewpew (Ifugao), bilbil, pahinghing, pautaw (Isneg, Tingguian), pakkung (Ibaloi), batiwtiw (Mindoro)
- Hornbostel–Sachs classification: 111.231 (Sets of percussion tubes)

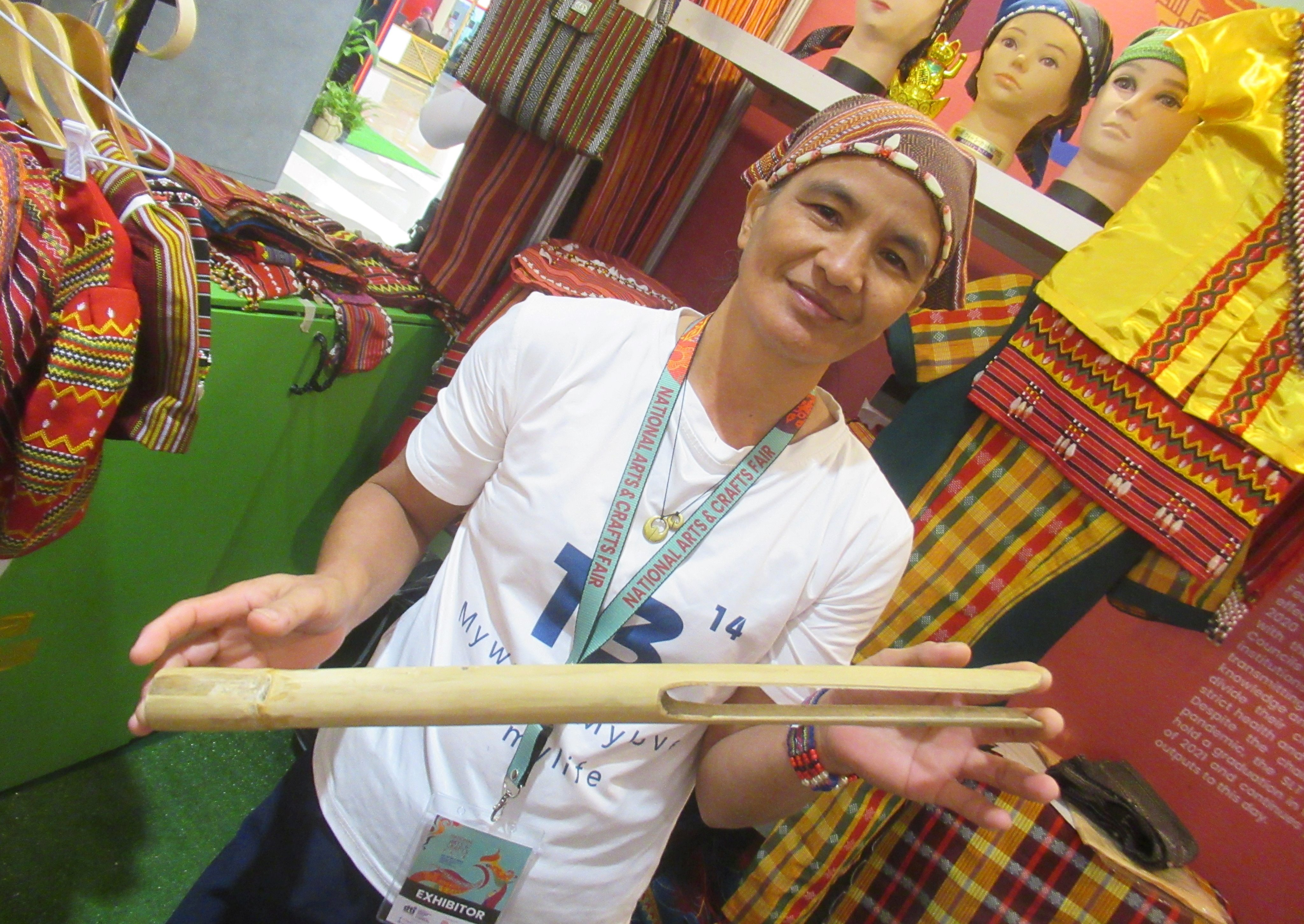
Bungkaka (ubbeng) Kalinga people

A bungkaka, also known as the bamboo buzzer, is a percussion instrument (idiophone) made out of bamboo common in numerous indigenous tribes around the Philippines such as the Ifugao, Kalinga, and Ibaloi.

== Construction ==
The instrument is constructed from a length of buhò (slender bamboo) with a node at the bottom end. The upper half is forked such that there are two tongues facing each other, while the bottom node acts as a resonator chamber.

== Playing ==
The instrument generates a buzzing sound from the slit between the two tongues when the instrument is struck against the lower palm of the hand of the player. Furthermore, the sound can be altered by covering and uncovering a hole found on the bottom half of the instrument with the thumb of the hand which grasps the instrument.
