= Isnag people =

Isnag
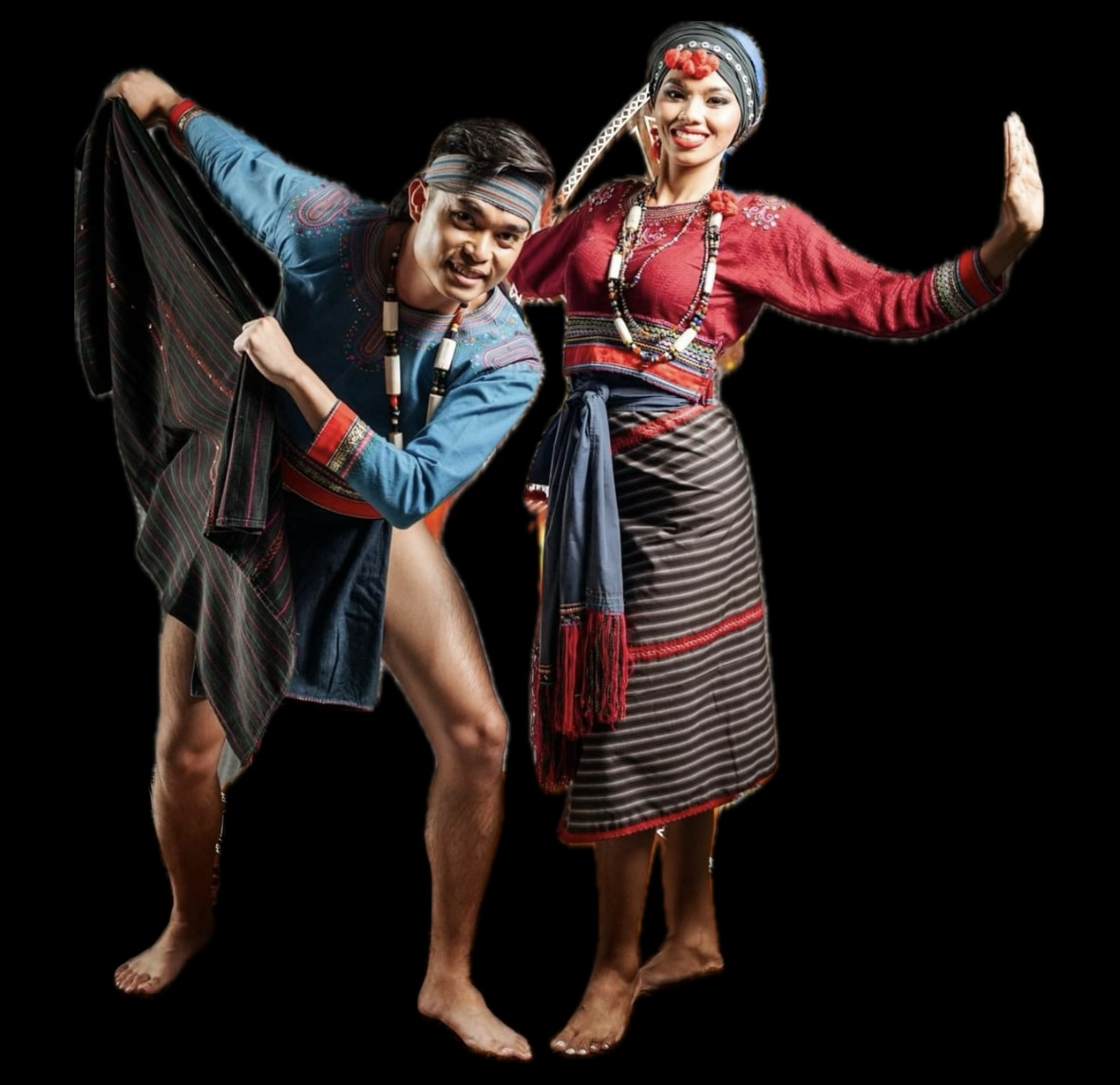
- An Isnag (Isneg) from the Imallod sub-tribe wearing traditional attire

Total population
- 50,101 (2020 census)

Regions with significant populations
- Philippines (Cordillera Administrative Region)

Languages
- Isnag, Ilocano, Tagalog

Religion
- Christianity, Indigenous folk religion

Related ethnic groups
- Igorot peoples

The Isnag people (also referred to as Isneg, Yapayao and Apayao) are an Austronesian ethnic group native to Apayao province in the Philippines' Cordillera Administrative Region, though they are also found in parts of Cagayan, Ilocos Norte, and Abra. Their native language is Isnag, although most Isnag also speak Ilocano.

The Isnag, also referred to as Yapayao, trace their origins to the Province of Apayao, though they are also found in parts of Cagayan, Ilocos Norte, and Abra. Their populations are distributed across the municipalities of Calanasan, Kabugao, Pudtol, Flora, Luna, Santa Marcela, and Conner in Apayao; the eastern part of Ilocos Norte, specifically Adams, Carasi, Dumalneg, Vintar, Marcos, Dingras, Solsona, Bangui and Pagudpud; the northwestern part of Cagayan, particularly Santa Praxedes, Claveria, Sanchez Mira, and Pamplona; and the northern part of Abra, particularly Tineg.

== Name ==
Isnag is derived from a combination of 'IS,' meaning 'recede,' and 'UNAG,' meaning 'interior.' Thus, it translates to 'people who live inland.' The Isnags are described as having a slender and graceful stature, being kind, hospitable, and generous, with a strong sense of self-reliance and courage.

Various names have been used to differentiate the Isnag. The Spaniards referred to them as los Apayaos (referring to the river along which they live) and los Mandayas (taken from the Isnag term meaning “upstream”). In 1923, they were the last ethnic group to be conquered by the American colonialists. Before, they had no collective name. Instead, they referred to themselves based on their residence or whether they lived: upstream (Imandaya) or downstream (Imallod).

The Isnags are called river people because they historically used riverways to navigate and settle in the mountains. The Imandaya prefer the upper streams "daya" of the Apayao River, Diksonan River, and Kadlay River, while the Imalawa favor the riverways of Vintar-surung, from Malawa (a sitio of Barangay DRAS, Calanasan) to Katoan (now Barangay Tanglagan, Calanasan). The Imallod live along the lower stream "allod" of the Apayao River. The Ingahan inhabit areas along the Nagan River while the Itawit domain is along the Tawit River, between Upper Atu' and Upper Pudtol in Apayao. The Isnags of Conner reside along a major tributary of the Matalag River. The Ehapayao/Iyapayao (Yapayao) prefer the Bulu River, known as 'payaw,' in the eastern part of Ilocos Norte and the northwestern part of Cagayan.

== Geography ==
The Isnags are native in Apayao province, which was formerly a sub-province of Mountain Province, but are also found in portions of Cagayan and Ilocos Norte. Apayao has an area of 397,720 hectares and is typographically divided into two parts: the Upper Apayao that is mountainous, and the Lower Apayao that is generally flat with rolling mountains and plateaus. Today, there are about 50, 000 Isnags living in Apayao. Isnag populations can also be found in the Eastern part of the Province of Ilocos Norte, specifically the municipalities of Adams, Carasi, Marcos, Dingras, Vintar, Dumalneg and Solsona; and in the Northwestern part of the Province of Cagayan, specifically the municipalities of Santa Praxedes, Claveria, Pamplona and Sanchez Mira. The majority of them live along the Apayao River-Abulog River, Matalag River, and the small rivers on the hillsides of Ilocos Norte and Abra.

== Social organization ==
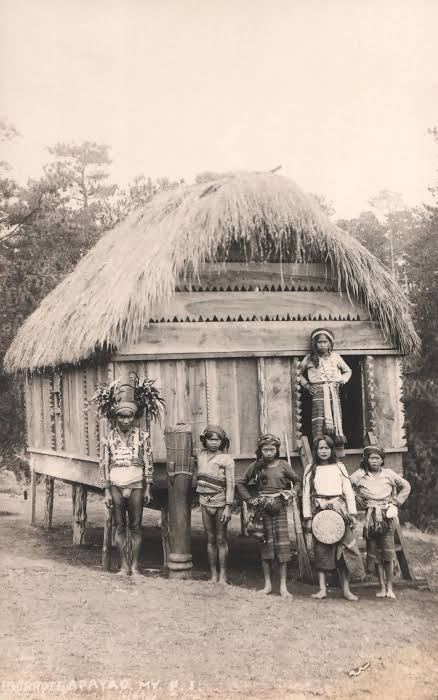
The Isnag Family and Isnag House

Because there was no political or ward system, the kinship groups and family clans became the central social organizations and were usually led by the husbands. Polygamy is allowed, but depends on the capacity of the husband to support the family. Like other ethnic groups, they also follow a lot of taboos. These taboos vary from place to place. A pregnant woman, for example, is discouraged to eat some kinds of sugarcane, banana, and the soft meat of sprouting coconut to have a normal conception. In the past, twins were also believed to be unlucky, so whenever twins were born, they would let the weaker twin die. Also, if the mother dies upon giving birth, the child is also left to die and is usually buried with the mother. The Isnags don’t follow rituals on the adolescence of the child. They, however, have rituals on marriage, like the amoman (or the present-day pamamanhikan), and death, like the mamanwa which is done by the widowers.

Isnag houses (balay) are two-story, one-room structures built on 4 corner posts with an entrance reached by a ladder. The open space below (linong or sidong) includes a small shed (abulor) for jars of basi. The bamboo pigpen(dohom) is nearby. Rice granaries (alang) are also made on four posts that include a circular and flat rat shield. Temporary buildings associated with upland and swidden farming are called sixay. Their bolo (badang) and axe (aliwa) are important tools. They are also expert fishermen.

== Culture ==
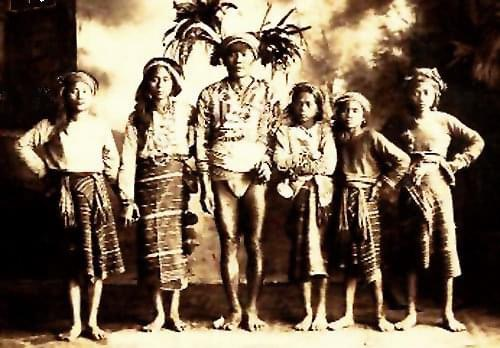
Isnag family circa 1900s

Isnag kinship is bilateral, meaning children are equally related to both the mother and the father. Households consist of interrelated families living close to each other, and extended families of three generations living together in their balay. The family is the key element in society, the larger the better, headed by the husband. No other society structure exists, though brave men, mengals, lead in hunting and fishing. The bravest, Kamenglan, is the overall leader. A young man entered their ranks after the first headhunting expedition. A mengal carries a red kerchief on the head and has tattoos on his arms and shoulders. They are animistic and practice polygamy.

=== Language ===
Isnag language is spoken by around 50, 000 people mostly by the Isnag people, who are also bilingual in Ilokano.

=== Religion ===
Approximately 9% of the population are Christians. In 2006, the entire New Testament, along with the books of Genesis and Exodus, had been translated into Isnag by SIL. The complete Bible was completed in 2023. Rest of the Isnags are mainly animists.

=== Clothing ===
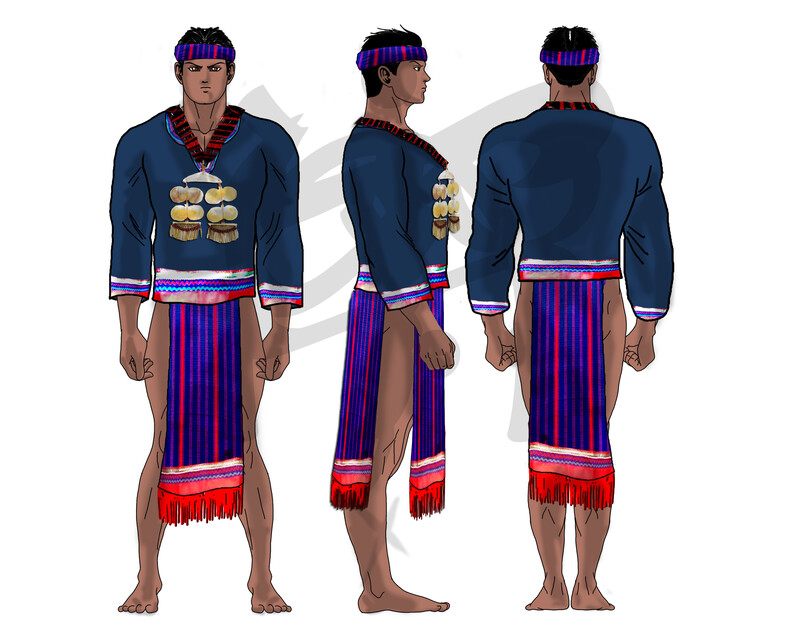
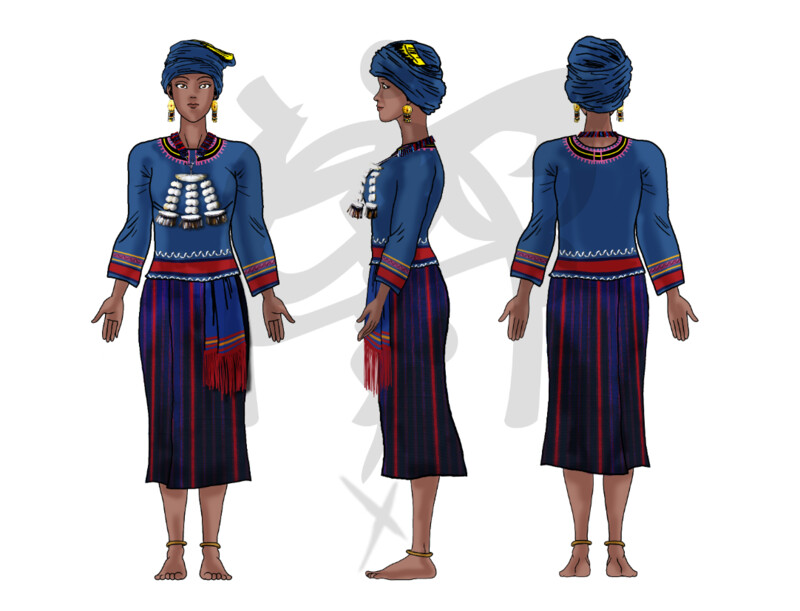
A illustrated depiction of traditional Isnag male and female attire

The traditional attire of the Isnag tribe reflects their rich cultural heritage and distinct aesthetic sensibilities.

Men's Attire: Isnag men traditionally wear a G-string called "abag," which is typically blue in color. For special occasions, they don an upper garment known as "bado." They also wear an ornament called "sipattal," made of shells and beads, specifically during significant events. Historically, warriors or "mengal" would wear a red kerchief on their heads and have tattoos on their arms and shoulders to signify their bravery and accomplishments in head-taking forays.

Women's Attire: Isnag women are known for their colorful garments. They wear a wraparound cloth called "aken," which comes in two sizes: a smaller one for everyday use and a larger one for ceremonial occasions. Their attire is often complemented by numerous ornaments and jewelry, showcasing their inclination towards vibrant and decorative clothing during festivities and important ceremonies.

These traditional garments are integral to the Isnag identity and are worn with pride during various cultural and social gatherings, reflecting their unique heritage and social structures.

=== Cuisine ===
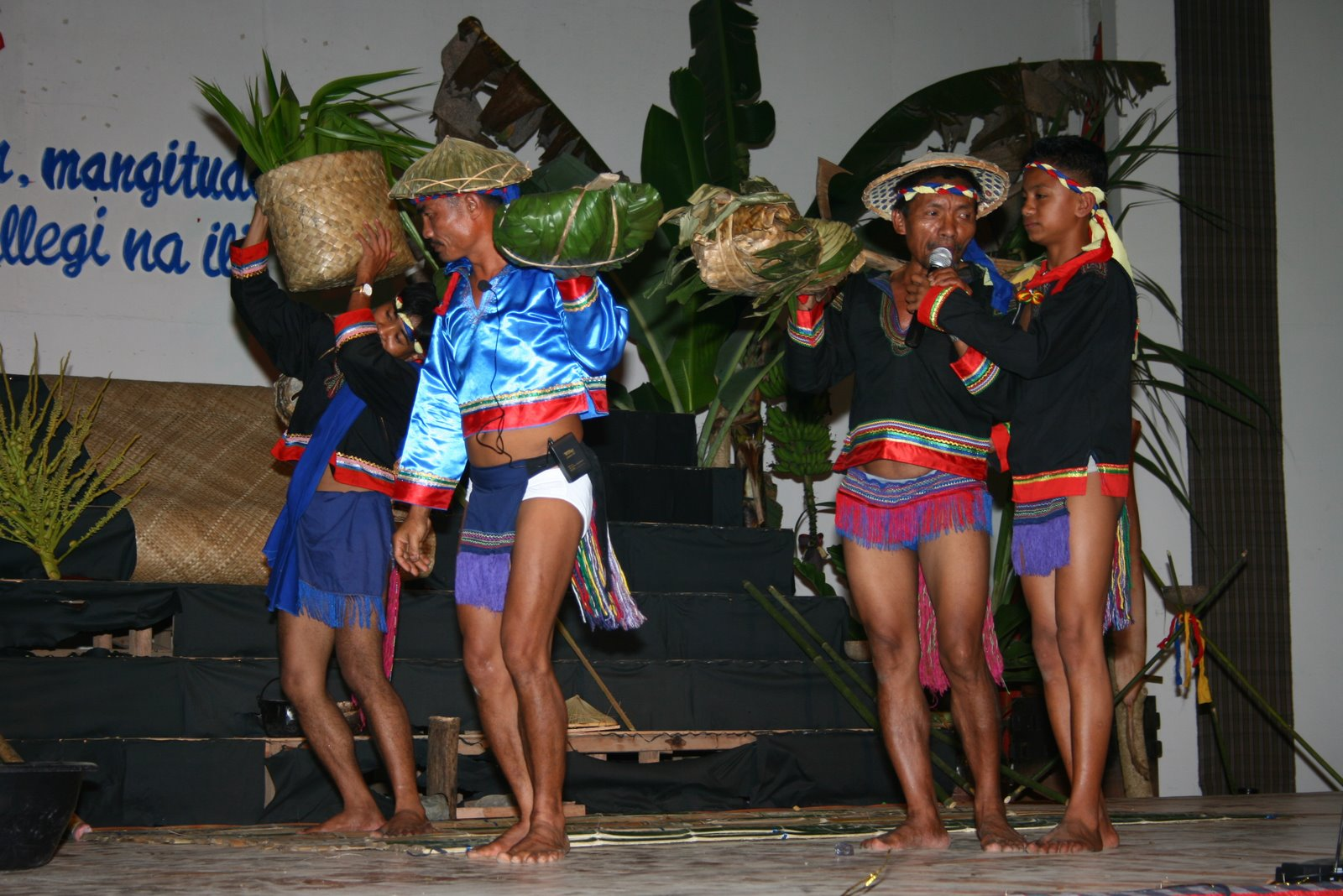
An Isnags from the Ymandaya sub-tribe carrying traditional crops and food

The isnags traditionally only consume two meals a day; one in the mid-morning and one in the late afternoon, or one at noon and the other in the evening. Though most of their meals include rice, rice is always scarce because of the limited womanpower. Hence, they resort to trade to satisfy demands. Meals also include vegetables and root crops such as camote and occasionally, fish and wild pig or wild deer. Dogs, pigs and chickens are only eaten during feasts and chicken eggs are seldom eaten because they are generally allowed to hatch. Sometimes, before or after meals, the typical isneg families enjoy home-grown coffee while gathering around the hearth while rice wine is only consumed during festive occasions.

They were proud of using bamboo as cooking utensils. They have sinursur, a dish made of catfish or eel on bamboo with chili, abraw, freshwater crabs with coconut and chili, sinapan, which looks like smoked meat. They used anything they can find in nature as food, from brooks, rivers, lakes and streams, they catch fish and other creatures in it. In forests, they use any edible leaves in there. They douse the harvest in cooking it with chili.

=== Funeral practices ===
The Isnag wrap the deceased person in a mat, and is then carried on the shoulders of the immediate male family members. Items are placed inside the coffin in order to help the deceased person throughout his/her journey. For example, a jar (basi) is placed in the coffin to quench the deceased one's thirst. Another example is a spear and shield also being put inside in order to help him/her protect himself/herself from enemies during the journey. The coffin is then lowered into either the kitchen area of their families home or in a burial site owned by his/her family.

== Early accounts of the Isnag ==
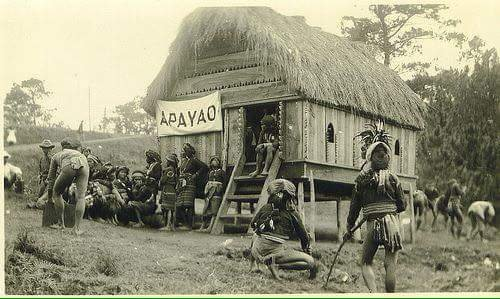
Special occasion of the Isnag

The Isnag are distinguished from the other Cordillerans by the fine construction of their houses, resembling that of the lowland Filipinos, and they are particularly conspicuous about cleanliness. Their houses are set on four large and strong straight posts of incorruptible wood resistant to humidity, driven into the earth; instead of being made of bamboo cut in long narrow strips joined by rattan, as the lowland Filipinos do. Their houses are airy and bigger, and they do everything to decorate it the best way they can. They barter for products from their mountains, such as beeswax, cacao, and tobacco.

Jean Mallat, a French adventurer in the Philippines during the 1800s.

== See also ==
- Dibagat
- Isnag language
- Isnag in the Provinces of Ilocos Norte and Cagayan
