= Journalism during the Marcos dictatorship =

Philippine journalism from 1972 to 1986

Journalism during the Marcos dictatorship in the Philippines—a fourteen year period between the declaration of Martial Law in September 1972 until the People Power Revolution in February 1986—was heavily restricted under the dictatorial rule of President Ferdinand Marcos in order to suppress political opposition and prevent criticism of his administration.

Hitherto considered the most prominent embodiment of press freedom in Asia, various Philippine mass media were shut down very suddenly in the early hours of September 23, 1972 when Marcos’ forces began enforcing Martial Law. The clampdown included 7 television stations, 16 national daily newspapers, 11 weekly magazines, 66 community newspapers, and 292 radio stations; as well as public utilities including the electricity company Meralco, the telephone company PLDT, and airlines. The most prominent television and newspaper reporters, publishers, columnists, and media owners were among the 400 people jailed in the first hours of Martial Law, with more arrested in Marcos’ dragnet in the succeeding days.

Newspapers owned by Marcos cronies such as Roberto Benedicto were the only ones allowed to publish in the immediate aftermath of the declaration, and media companies taken over by such associates became the dominant media outlets, eventually becoming referred to as the "crony press".

Journalists who evaded arrest went underground and came out with alternative publications such as Balita ng Malayang Pilipinas (News of the Free Philippines) and Taliba ng Bayan (The Nation's Sentinel). These were sometimes referred to as the "underground press". In later years, pressure from the international community and from the politically influential Catholic Church forced Marcos to allow publication of some newspapers critical of his administration, although Marcos ensured he could shut them down “just like that.” These publications were referred to as the “alternative press,” or because they were irritations Marcos could swat down with ease, the “mosquito press.”

Key turning points in the history of Philippine journalism in this time include: the establishment of WE Forum in 1977 and of Ang Pahayagang Malaya in 1981; the landmark coverage of the assassination of indigenous opposition leader Macli-ing Dulag; the Chico River Dam Project; the 1982 exposé of Ferdinand Marcos' fake military medals which led to the closure of WE Forum and jailing of its prominent columnists; and the 1984 murder of leading Mindanao journalist Alex Orcullo in Davao City.

Two radio stations – Radyo Veritas 846 and DZRJ-AM, disguised as "Radyo Bandido" – played a pivotal role in overthrowing Marcos. These non-government stations aired the appeal of Cardinal Jaime Sin, Archbishop of Manila, for Filipinos to go to Epifanio delos Santos Avenue (EDSA) and prevent Marcos from killing the leaders of a failed coup attempt, and then keeping local and international audiences updated about the ensuing People Power Revolution.

== Rationale for media control and censorship ==
Before the declaration of martial law, mass media in the Philippines functioned as a government watchdog and source of information for citizens. Marcos exerted considerable effort to stifle the free press, which is considered a key feature of a functioning democracy. He shut down media outlets and set up set up print and broadcast outlets that he controlled through his cronies. In doing so, he silenced public criticism and opposition by controlling information that the people had access to. This allowed him to have the final say on what passed as truth.

By controlling the press, the dictatorship was able to suppress negative news and create an exaggerated perception of progress.

== Shutdown and takeover of mass media ==
Presidential Proclamation No. 1081, putting the Philippines under Martial Law, was dated September 21, but it was only publicly announced on the evening of September 23, preceded by a wave of arrests that began shortly before midnight on September 22.

=== Letters of Instruction No. 1 and No. 1-A ===
Through Letter of Instruction No. 1, signed on September 22, a day before the public declaration of martial law, Marcos ordered the military take over of the assets of privately owned media companies. The letter was written in view of what Marcos called a national emergency, in which existed a "criminal conspiracy to seize political and state power." All privately owned newspapers, magazines, television, radio, and other mass media were ordered to be taken over and controlled so as to prevent their use for purposes that sought to undermine the government. The letter was addressed to Press Secretary Francisco Tatad and Secretary of National Defense Juan Ponce Enrile.

On September 28, Marcos issued Letter of Instruction No. 1-A, ordering the armed forces to seize and sequester facilities owned by ABS-CBN Broadcasting Corporation and Associated Broadcasting Corporation, two of the largest broadcasting companies in the Philippines. The principal officers of both corporations, according to the letter, were actively engaged in activities subverting the government. Marcos also accused both of allowing the dissemination of deliberately skewed, exaggerated, and false information with a view towards subverting the government and promoting the Communist Party of the Philippines. The takeover included all facilities owned and operated by the two corporations, including their TV and radio subsidiaries in the cities of Davao, Cebu, Laoag, and Dagupan. The facilities of ABS-CBN were later transferred to Marcos crony Roberto Benedicto's Kanlaon Broadcasting System (or KBS, now operating as Radio Philippines Network), and still later to the government-owned Maharlika Broadcasting System (now operating as People's Television Network).

=== Arrests of media workers ===
By dawn on September 23, 100 of the 400 individuals on Marcos's "Priority Arrest List" were in detention centers, including Manila Times publisher Chino Roces, newspaper editors Amando Doronila of the Daily Mirror, Luis Mauricio of the Philippine Graphic, Teodoro Locsin Sr. of the Philippine Free Press, and Rolando Fadul of the vernacular broadsheet Taliba. Also arrested were reporters Robert Ordoñez of the Philippine Herald, Rosalinda Galang of the Manila Times; columnists Ernesto Granada of the Manila Chronicle and Maximo Soliven of the Manila Times, and Luis Beltran and Ruben Cusipag of the Evening News. Church publications are also not allowed to operate. Among the publications closed were the Signs of the Times published by the Association of Major Religious Superiors of the Philippines and The Communicator published by the Jesuits. Several radio stations operated by the Catholic Church and United Church of Christ in the Philippines in Bukidnon and Davao were shut also down.

Philippines Free Press associate editor Napoleon Rama and ABC-5 broadcaster and The Big News anchor Jose Mari Velez also happened to be delegates to the 1971 Constitutional Convention, and were among the 11 outspoken convention delegates to be arrested. (The others included Heherson Alvarez, Alejandro Lichuaco, Voltaire Garcia, and Teofisto Guingona Jr.)

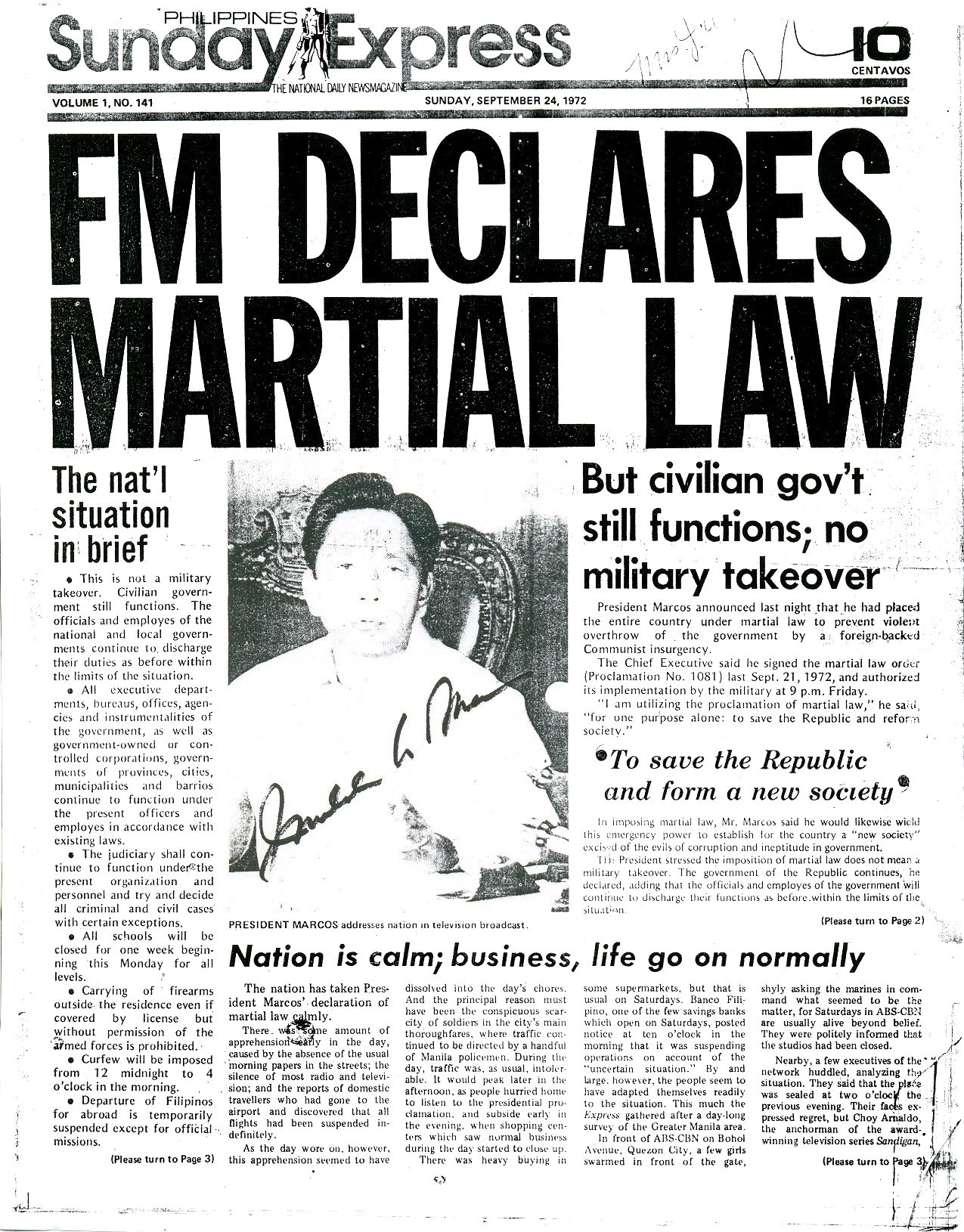
The Daily Express, in its Sunday edition, announcing the declaration of martial law while reassuring its readers that business and life will "go on normally." The final years of martial law saw mounting protests against government-owned or controlled mass media, including the Daily Express.

By the morning of September 23, 1972, martial law forces had successfully implemented a media lockdown, with only outlets owned or controlled by the government allowed to operate. In the afternoon, Benedicto-owned television channel KBS-9 went back on air playing episodes of Hanna-Barbera's Wacky Races cartoon series, which was interrupted at 3:00 PM, when Press Secretary Francisco Tatad went on air to read Proclamation No. 1081, through which Marcos declared martial law. Ferdinand Marcos himself went on air at 7:17 that evening to formalize the announcement. The following morning, on September 24, the headline of Benedicto's Daily Express announced "FM Declares Martial Law" – the only national newspaper to come out in the immediate aftermath of martial law. (The Mindanao Tribune, which had not received notification of the media lockdown, had been able to put out an edition by the evening of September 23.)

The declaration shut down 7 television stations, 16 national daily newspapers, 11 weekly magazines, 66 community newspapers, and 292 radio stations; as well as public utilities such as Meralco, PLDT, and the then-existing Philippine Airlines.

=== Killing of media workers ===
According to the Philippine Movement for Press Freedom, 34 journalists were killed during the Marcos dictatorship.

In April 1973, student journalist and activist Liliosa Hilao was arrested, detained in Camp Crame, tortured, and killed by her military captors. She was the first political detainee killed during martial law. Hilao was an editor of Hasik, the school organ of Pamantasan ng Lungsod ng Maynila, for which she wrote essays critical of the Marcos dictatorship.

== Censorship under Ferdinand Marcos ==
Although some of the press was eventually allowed to reopen their doors, news was heavily regulated and censored. All publications, including those from foreign news outfits, had to be approved by the Department of Public Information. Department Order No. 1 required all news outlets to assist in the administration of martial law by only reporting news that had positive national value. Presidential Decree No. 191 require all news agencies to get clearance from the Media Advisory Council (MAC) before publishing or airing any content. Society news, editorial commentary, and content critical to the Philippine government were among those banned. The government seized control of privately owned media. Only Daily Express and Bulletin Today (now operating as Manila Bulletin) were allowed to resume operations among those publications that existed prior to Martial Law. The regulations bred self-censorship among members of the press, which were traditionally adversarial towards the government.

The foreign press' access to information was also heavily regulated. Foreign journalists critical of the regime were often expelled or had their visas denied. Marcos accused Arnold Zeitlin of the Associated Press of ‘malicious and false reporting’ during his coverage of the fighting between the government forces and Muslim Filipino separatists in Jolo, Sulu. Zeitlin was expelled from the Philippines in 1976. A year later, the government denied the visa application of Bernard Wideman, a news correspondent of The Washington Post and Far Eastern Economic Review. Wideman covered Marcos' seizure of privately owned companies like Philippine Airlines and Philippine Cellophane Film Corporation. Wideman's expulsion was eventually reversed by the Immigration Commission.

The government also censored other forms of media outside of print, radio, and television. Books such as Primitivo Mijares's The Conjugal Dictatorship of Ferdinand and Imelda Marcos and Carmen Pedrosa's The Untold Story of Imelda Marcos are banned. Film was censored through the Board of Censors for Moving Pictures (BCMP). Letter of Instruction No. 13 issued on September 29, 1972, prohibited films perceived to incite subversion and rebellion, glorify criminals, show the use of prohibited drugs, and undermine the people's confidence in the government. It also sought to ban any film that, to the judgment of the BCMP, was not aligned with the spirit of Proclamation No. 1081.

=== Media and communications-related issuances ===
The following is a list of Presidential Decrees, Letters of Instruction, and other official issuances that shaped the mass media landscape of the period, arranged by year of signing or release.

==== 1972 ====
- Letter of Instruction No. 1, signed September 22 - Ordered the taking over and control of all privately owned mass media for the duration of martial law.
- Letter of Authority No. 1, signed September 22 - Authorized the operation of Radio Philippines Network, Kanlaon Broadcasting Network, the Voice of the Philippines, Philippines Broadcasting System, and the Daily Express.
- Department Order No.1, issued September 25 - Issued by the Department of Public Information (DPI). Provided the guidelines and policies to be followed by news media, emphasizing "news reports of positive national value" and requiring all materials to be cleared with the DPI prior to publication. This includes all foreign dispatches or cables.
- Letter of Instruction No. 10, signed September 26 - Ordered the country's Postmaster General to adopt measures to effectively control the use of mails in order to avoid their use for anti-government propaganda.
- Letter of Instruction No. 1-A, signed September 28 - Ordered the Department of National Defense to sequester the TV and radio facilities of the ABS-CBN Broadcasting Corporation and the Associated Broadcasting Corporation.
- Letter of Instruction No. 13, signed September 29 - Provided a list of qualifications that the BCMP is to use in identifying films that will be banned from public exhibition in any theater in the country. Consequences for violation included the closure of any theater involved and the arrest and prosecution of any person involved.
- Letter of Instruction No. 13-A, signed September 29 - Required all radio dealers and manufacturers to submit monthly reports of their sales, including the names of the persons, companies, and entities who purchased their products.
- Letter of Implementation No. 12, signed November 1 - Authorized the creation of the Bureau of Standards for Mass Media.

==== 1973 ====
- Presidential Decree No. 191, signed May 11 - Created the Media Advisory Council (MAC), which was to review all applications for mass media entities to operate, such that no entity may broadcast or publish without first getting a Certificate of Authority to Operate form the MAC. All certificates were also to be approved by Marcos before becoming valid and effective and had to be renewed every six months.

==== 1974 ====
- Presidential Decree No. 576, signed November 9 - Abolished the MAC and authorized the creation of regulatory councils for print media and broadcast media. Both councils were authorized to formulate and enforce policies, guidelines, rules, and regulations for all media activities within their authority. Specified that no mass media group or entity that had been closed or sequestered in September 1972 in line with the martial law declaration can be granted a certificate of registration. The abolition of the MAC was seen as a move to assuage foreign criticisms on the regime's curtailment of freedoms, including those of foreign newsmen.

==== 1980 ====
- Presidential Decree No. 1737, signed September 12 - Emphasized that the President or Prime Minister may, as he deems necessary, and among other things, order the closure of subversive publications and ban or regulate modes of entertainment or exhibition of the same nature.

==== 1981 ====
- Presidential Decree No. 1834, signed January 16 - Increased the penalties for rebellion, sedition, and related crimes. Speeches, proclamations, writings, emblems, banners, and other materials interpreted as inciting to rebellion or sedition were made punishable with reclusion perpetual to death.

== The crony press ==
When martial law was declared, soldiers padlocked the offices of major newspapers and wire agencies in Metro Manila and posted copies of Proclamation 1081 on their doors. Journalists were arrested on charges of subversion and other crimes. Media outlets owned or taken over by cronies or Ferdinand Marcos were later allowed to operate, such as the Philippine Daily Express, Bulletin Today, Times Journal, and Kanlaon Broadcasting System. These came to be known as the admin press or the crony press. It was also described by National Artist Nick Joaquin as a conformist press.

Ferdinand Marcos's crony Roberto Benedicto owned print publications Daily Express and Weekend magazine and television channels Kanlaon Broadcasting System (later relaunched as Radio Philippines Network), Intercontinental Broadcasting Corporation, and, later, ABS-CBN, as well as multiple radio stations. Benjamin Romualdez, Imelda Marcos's brother, owned Times Journal, Times Mirror, and People's Journal. Hanz Menzi, Ferdinand Marcos's aide, owned Bulletin Today, Panorama, Tempo, and Balita.

== The opposition press ==
=== The underground press ===
Journalists who were able to evade the mass arrests in the early months of the dictatorship set up underground publications, sometimes referred to as the "underground press". These underground publications include the newspapers Balita ng Malayang Pilipinas (put out by Satur Ocampo and Carolina "Bobbie" Malay) and Taliba ng Bayan. The publications were sometimes reproduced in makeshift offices using mimeograph machines.

The underground press published news stories and opinions that were banned from the mainstream press and broadcast stations. For example, while the crony press printed stories that falsely portrayed a "golden age of the Philippine economy", Antonio Zumel published stories in Ang Bayan that tried to demonstrate how the dictatorship's export-oriented and import-dependent economy benefited a few instead of rural communities.

In addition to publications written in Filipino and English, local underground papers written in regional languages such as Ilocano, Bikolano, Bisaya, Samarnon, and Hiligaynon were also published.

Artists and journalists also published an underground magazine on arts and culture called Ulos.

=== The "mosquito" press ===
In later years, pressure from the international community and from the Catholic Church forced Marcos to allow the publication of some newspapers critical of his administration, although Marcos made sure he could shut them down "just like that." These publications were referred to as the "alternative press," or, because they were irritations Marcos could swat down with ease, the "mosquito press."

Among these publications that formed part of the mosquito press were Joe Burgos' WE Forum and Pahayagang Malaya; Veritas, edited by Felix Bautista and Melinda de Jesus; Raul and Leticia Locsin's Business Day (present-day Business World); Eugenia Apostol and Leticia Magsanoc's Inquirer and Mr. and Ms. Magazine.

=== Xerox journalism ===
The phenomenon of samizdat or xerox journalism also proliferated, which involved the dissemination of news clippings, usually from publications abroad that were not checked by the government's censors. These often proliferated through Filipino journalists working for foreign news outfits.

=== Beginnings of investigative journalism in the mainstream press ===
Although still unable to directly investigate the Marcos administration itself, reporters for the mainstream press slowly explored the possibility of covering anomalies and crimes linked to Marcos' supporters and cronies, particularly in the countryside, as the 1980s rolled in. Key stories that were published during this time included Maria Ceres Doyo's coverage of the murder of Macliing Dulag for Panorama Magazine, and Demosthenes Dingcong's investigation of fund irregularities at the Mindanao State University, where Marcos supporter Ali Dimaporo was president, for the Bulletin Today.

== Macli-ing Dulag murder coverage ==
The murder of Kalinga leader Macli-ing Dulag, who led the indigenous people of the Cordillera in protesting Marcos' Chico River Dam Project, became a turning point in the history of Martial Law, because for the first time since the press crackdown during the declaration of Martial Law in 1972, the mainstream Philippine press joined the mosquito press in confronting the issue of military arrests on civilians under Martial Law.

== Murders of Jacobo Amatong and Alex Orcullo ==
The public outrage resulting from the death of prominent Mindanaoan journalist Alex Orcullo in Davao City on October 19, 1984 became an important rallying point of the fight against the Marcos dictatorship in Mindanao, resonating with the assassination of Ninoy Aquino in Luzon the year before. On the Zamboanga Peninsula, the September 24, 1984, murder of Mindanao Observer publisher Jacobo Amatong had a similar effect.

== Role of radio stations in the People Power Revolution ==
=== Radyo Veritas 846 ===
With opposition forces already poised to go to the streets after massive cheating during the 1986 Presidential Election, Catholic Church-run radio station Radyo Veritas 846 aired a call from Jaime Sin, Archbishop of Manila, for Filipinos to go to EDSA highway and prevent Marcos from killing the leaders of a failed coup attempt—an appeal that triggered the People Power Revolution. Radyo Veritas kept local and international audiences informed of events relating to the revolution, but was assaulted by Marcos' soldiers on February 23 and 24, 1986, leading to its shutdown and the injury of some of its staff members.

=== Radyo Bandido ===
After Radyo Veritas was shut down by Marcos' soldiers, a small group led by Jesuit priest Fr. James Reuter, SJ and actress June Keithley took over the transmitter of DZRJ-AM, changed its frequencies to mask their location, and broadcast as "Radyo Bandido" (Outlaw Radio), continuing to report on the events of the revolution and eventually announcing that Marcos had run away from the seat of power in Malacañang Palace, ending his 21 years in power, which included 14 years as dictator.

== Martyrs and heroes honored at the Bantayog ng mga Bayani ==
=== Liliosa Hilao ===
Liliosa Rapi Hilao (March 14, 1950 – April 5, 1973) was a Filipina student journalist and activist. She was the first prisoner to die in detention during martial law in the Philippines.

=== Ditto Sarmiento ===
Abraham "Ditto" Pascual Sarmiento Jr. (June 5, 1950 – November 11, 1977) was a Filipino student journalist who gained prominence as an early and visible critic of the martial law regime of dictator Ferdinand Marcos. As editor-in-chief of the Philippine Collegian, Ditto melded the University of the Philippines student newspaper into an independent though solitary voice against martial law rule at a time when the mass media was under the control of the Marcos government. His subsequent seven-month imprisonment by the military impaired his health and contributed to his premature death.

=== Tony Nieva ===
Antonio Maria "Tony" Onrubia Nieva (September 21, 1944 – October 13, 1997) was a Filipino journalist, union organizer, and activist. He worked to defend press freedom and the rights of workers, and campaigned to end authoritarian rule in the Philippines. He led the National Press Club as president and founded the National Union of Journalists of the Philippines. Nieva led a campaign for the release of publisher Jose "Joe" Burgos Jr. and other journalists from the independent newspaper We Forum. We Forum, which published articles critical of the government, was raided and shut down in December 1982.

=== Chino Roces ===
Joaquin "Chino" Pardo Roces (June 29, 1913 – September 30, 1988) was a Filipino businessman and newspaper publisher. Roces was arrested and jailed when martial law was imposed in 1972, together with Benigno "Ninoy" Aquino Jr., José W. "Ka Pepe" Diokno, who is the father of human rights, and Lorenzo M. "Ka Tanny" Tañada Sr. and other journalists. As soon as he was released, he took to the streets to openly protest the Marcos dictatorship. After the assassination of Benigno "Ninoy" Aquino Jr. in 1983, he further intensified his protest and during a vigil on Mendiola Bridge, Roces was drenched by water cannons.

=== Chit Estella ===
Lourdes "Chit" Panganiban Estella-Simbulan (August 19, 1957 – May 13, 2011) was a Filipino journalist and professor, known for her critical writings on government repression, abuse, corruption and human rights violations. She was a student journalist at the Philippine Collegian, which published articles critical of the ills of the Marcos dictatorship. She later began writing for underground publications Liberation, Balita ng Malayang Pilipinas, and Taliba ng Bayan, as well as for Ang Pahayagang Malaya and Mr. & Ms.

== See also ==
- Bantayog ng mga Bayani
- Protest art against the Marcos dictatorship
- Indigenous people’s resistance against the Marcos dictatorship
- Religious sector resistance against the Marcos dictatorship
