= Puri Pedro =

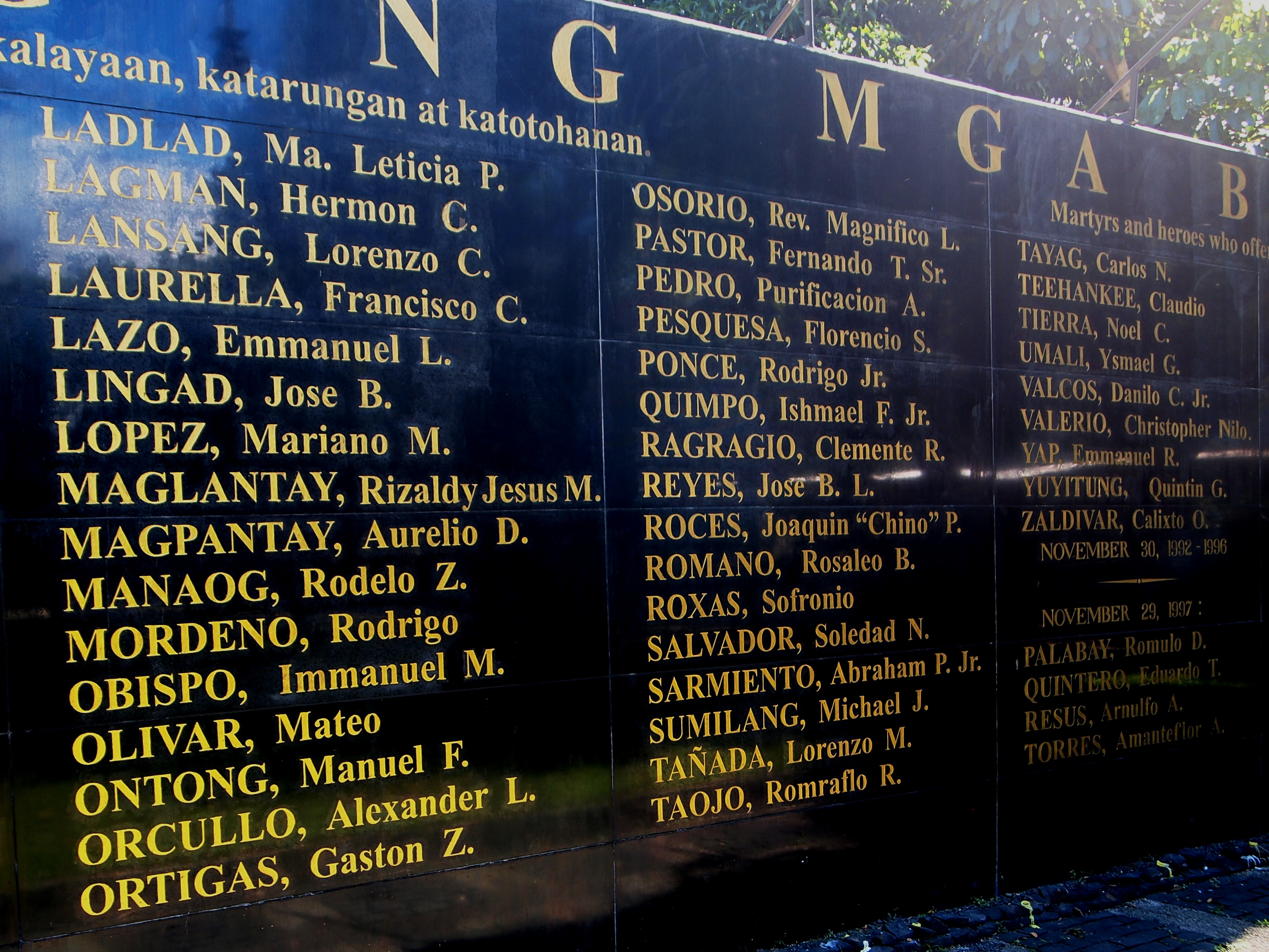
- Detail of the Wall of Remembrance at the Bantayog ng mga Bayani, showing names from the first batch of Bantayog Honorees, including that of Puri Pedro.
- Born: Purificacion Abarro Pedro; September 22, 1948; Laoag, Ilocos Norte, Philippines
- Died: January 23, 1977 (aged 28); Balanga, Bataan, Philippines
- Education: University of the Philippines Diliman (BS)
- Occupation: Social worker
- Awards: Honored at the Bantayog ng mga Bayani wall of remembrance

Purificacion "Puri" Abarro Pedro (September 22, 1948 – January 23, 1977) was a Filipino social worker and Catholic layman who was killed by soldiers under the dictatorship of Philippine President Ferdinand Marcos at the Bataan Provincial Hospital in 1977.

== Parish work ==
Pedro graduated with a degree in Social Work from the University of the Philippines, after which she 1969 national board examination for social workers, becoming the #10 topnotcher of all the board exam takers that year. She first worked for the National Rehabilitation Training Center, which provided services for the physical handicapped.

In 1970, though, she began her work at the Immaculate Conception Parish in Cubao, Quezon City, where her tasks included helping run the parish's day nursery and sewing group for urban poor women, while also handling the educational program of two cooperatives. She led summer camps and leadership seminars for the urban poor and the out-of-school youth served by the Parish.

She also did work for the Lady of Fatima Parish in Mandaluyong, Rizal, contributing to that parish's Christian community-building and leaders’ formation programs.

== Community volunteer work ==
Aside from her work with the parishes in Cubao and Mandaluyong, Puri Pedro also began volunteer community work, beginning with the Luzon floods of 1972, during which she helped bring medicine and relief goods to many affected areas around Quezon City.

In 1975, she resigned from her Parish job, convinced that she had to do what she could to help the various Indigenous People communities which resisted the Chico River Dam Project.

== Murder ==
Towards the end of 1976, Puri Pedro was accepted to join the staff of the Catholic church’s Luzon Secretariat for Social Action (LUSSA), and was about to start in that post in January 1977 when she decided to visit friends in Bataan who had joined the armed resistance against the Marcos Dictatorship. Her visit happened to coincide with a military assault on the camp where her friends were based, and Pedro was injured in the operation, taking a bullet wound in her shoulder. She was brought to the Bataan Provincial Hospital, where she was beginning to recover.

On her sixth day in the hospital, Marcos administration soldiers led by Col. Rolando Abadilla forced their way into Puri Perdo's hospital room, saying they wanted to interrogate her, and ordering Puri's sister, who had been watching over her, to leave the room.

They left Puri's hospital room after an hour, and when Puri's companions came back into her hospital room, they found her dead, with a medal of the Virgin Mary in her hand. Puri Pedro had been strangled by a piece of wire in the hospital room's lavatory.

== Legacy ==
For her martyrdom, and for her parish and volunteer work, including her time with the Kalinga and Bontoc peoples who resisted the Chico River Dam Project, she was honored by having her name inscribed on the wall of remembrance at the Philippines' Bantayog ng mga Bayani (monument of heroes).

She is also honored as one of the five "woman martyrs" of the University of the Philippines Diliman, and she is listed among Filipino Catholics nominated to be named Servant of God.
