= Dulag =

Dulag may refer to:

- Macliing Dulag, an assassinated Filipino indigenous peoples' rights activist
- Dulag, Leyte, a municipality in the Philippines
- Dulag or Durchgangslager, the German term for a prisoner transit camp
