= Indigenous Philippine art =

Indigenous Philippine art is art made by the indigenous peoples of the Philippines. It includes works in raw materials such as extract from trees, fruits, and vegetables. Some of the art treasure of the Philippines is found in rock in caves, trees and woods.

== Agono Rock engravings ==
In one cave, there are different carvings created by former resident tribes. They are the oldest known cave art carvings in the Philippines, dating to approximately 1000 B.C. Originally, there were 127 engravings of human and animal figures in stick form.

== Industrial arts ==
18th and 19th centuries industrial arts included clay pots.
