= Indigenous people's resistance against the Marcos dictatorship =

Opposition in the Philippines, 1970s and 1980s

Indigenous people’s resistance against the Marcos dictatorship varied from case to case among the various indigenous peoples of the Philippines. The most documented cases are the various resistance movements towards the Marcos administration’s appropriation of indigenous lands, particularly in the case of the Chico River Dam Project and the Manila Water Supply III project on the Kaliwa River watershed, and the birth of the various separatist groups and their coalescing into the Moro conflict in the wake of news about the Jabidah Massacre.

Groups of indigenous peoples were subjected to massacres and other human rights violations throughout the Martial Law era, as was the case of the Subanen family in the Tudela massacre. However, this did not necessarily result in organized opposition from the Indigenous People group as a whole.

== Indigenous people’s resistance against Marcos dam projects ==
The most prominently documented instances of Indigenous people’s resistance against the Marcos administration’s appropriation of indigenous lands involve cases where indigenous land rights were threatened by dam construction projects, most famously the Chico River Dam Project and the Manila Water Supply III project on the Kaliwa River watershed.

=== Resistance to the Chico River Dam ===
The Chico River Dam Project was a proposed hydroelectric power generation project that various Igorot people groups, notably the Kalinga people, resisted because of its threat to their residences, livelihood, and culture. The project was shelved in the 1980s after public outrage in the wake of the murder of opposition leader Macli-ing Dulag. It is now considered a landmark case study concerning ancestral domain issues in the Philippines.

Even if only part of the project pushed through, the project's watershed would have encompassed the municipalities of Tinglayan, Lubuagan, Pasil, and parts of Tabuk in Kalinga Province, and the municipalities of Sabangan, Sagada, Sadanga, Bontoc, Bauko, and parts of Barlig in Mountain Province. Contemporary estimates suggest that the project would have displaced about 100,000 Kalingas and Bontoks. In Kalinga, the barrios of Ableg, Cagaluan, Dupag, Tanglag, Dognac, and Mabongtot would be completely submerged. The Kalinga-Apayao government estimated that more than 1,000 families would be rendered homeless as a result, and P31,500,000 worth of farmlands would be lost. An additional P38,250,000 worth of rice fields farmed by the residents of Bangad, Lubuagan, Dangtalan, Guinaang, and Naneng would also be flooded, even if the villages themselves would not be submerged.

In 1977, numerous opposition leaders—including tribal leaders Lumbaya Aliga Gayudan, Macli-ing Dulag, and even a 12-year-old child—were rounded up by these forces and incarcerated for up to two months. Opposition leaders were undaunted, and more bodong peace pacts ceremonies were organized—including two of the largest bodong councils ever, in June 1978, and December 1979. The December 1979 bodong was attended by 2,000 Kalingas and Bontocs and saw Macli-ing Dulag officially designated as the official spokesperson for the opposition effort.

On 24 April 1980, armed forces under the command of then-President Ferdinand Marcos—identified in the press as elements from 4th Infantry Division of the Philippine Army—opened fire on Dulag at his home, killing him instantly. Macli-ing Dulag's murder became a turning point in the history of Martial Law, because for the first time since the press crackdown during the declaration of Martial Law in 1972, the mainstream Philippine press confronted the issue of the military's arrests of civilians under Martial Law. Macli-ing's murder unified the various peoples of the Cordillera Mountains against the proposed dam, causing both the World Bank and the Marcos regime to eventually abandon the project a few years after.

=== Resistance to the Kaliwa River Dam ===
Manila Water Supply III project of the Marcos administration, sometimes referred to as the first “Laiban Dam” project, was the first of numerous proposed dams in the Kaliwa River watershed. In November 1979, the Metropolitan Waterworks and Sewerage System (MWSS) was tasked to look for potential dam sites, and identified the Kaliwa River basin to be the most viable alternative. Thus in the same year, the first World Bank feasibility study on the damming of the Kaliwa river began. The history of projects on the Kaliwa River watershed began with the conception of the Manila Water Supply III project in November 1979 during the administration of President Ferdinand Marcos. However, Marcos instructed the MWSS to look for alternative sites. The MWSS identified the Kaliwa River basin to be the most viable alternative, and began the first World Bank feasibility study on the damming of the Kaliwa river in 1979.

The Indigenous peoples who lived in the watershed, including the Remontado Agta who were most affected, opposed the dam. They first appealed to the Marcos administration to stop the construction. But when Marcos refused, they “responded with intense social mobilization over many years,” with tactics including protests, road blockades, and other approaches.

Eventually, the Philippine economy went into rapid decline because Marcos' debt driven deficit spending made the Philippines vulnerable when the United States increased its interest rates in the third quarter of 1981. The ensuing collapse of the Philippine economy, worsened by the political pressure after the assassination of Benigno Aquino, led to slow development of the Laiban dam project until Marcos was forced out of office and into exile by the 1986 People Power Revolution.

== Rise of the Moro conflict ==
While sometimes obscured by the separatist nature of various groups who came into conflict with the government (e.g. the Moro National Liberation Front and the Moro Islamic Liberation Front), the immediate causes of the Moro conflict that is only slowly being resolved today are usually traced to the first term of Ferdinand Marcos.

The immediate spark of the Moro conflict is attributed to unrest brought about by news about the Jabidah massacre in March, 1968 – towards the end of the first term of President Ferdinand Marcos. A senate exposé based on the testimony of an alleged survivor claimed that at least 11 Filipino Muslim military trainees had been killed in Corregidor by soldiers of the Armed Forces of the Philippines. The trainees were alleged to have been part of a plot to infiltrate and destabilize Sabah.

The news caused unrest among Filipino Muslims, especially among students. Both Muslim intellectuals and common people suddenly became politicized, discrediting the idea of finding integration and accommodation with the rest of the country, and creating a sense of marginalization.

This led to the rise of organizations such as the Muslim Independence Movement and the Bangsamoro Liberation Organization at first, and eventually organizations such as the Moro National Liberation Front and the Moro Islamic Liberation Front.

== Prominent individuals ==
- Tayab "Arthur" Aboli - Butbut tribe leader who became OIC Barangay Captain after his predecessor Macli-ing Dulag was killed. Later became part of the Cordillera People's Liberation Army (CPLA) and became a key figure in the Mount Data Peace Accord soon after Ferdinand Marcos was ousted by the People Power revolution.
- Buyog (Manuel Sampiano) — leader and tribal historian of the Ata people of the Paquibato District of Davao City and one of the first Ata catechists under the Apostolate for Cultural Communities. Became one of the Marcos dictatorship desaparacidos when he left home saying he would file a report to the Catholic church regarding the abuses of the Marcos dictatorship against the Ata people
- Jennifer Cariño (March 4, 1950 – July 13, 1976) — an Ibaloi scholar and cultural worker who belonged to the prominent Cariño which originally owned the land where Baguio City and Camp John Hay now stand, joined the underground resistance against Marcos in 1974 and spent the last two years of her life giving literacy lessons and doing acupuncture services among the Kalanguya people before she was killed in an accident in 1976
- Pedro Dungoc Sr. (January 1, 1943 – June 22, 1985) — a farmer of the Butbut tribe of Kalinga province who would serve as Macli-ing Dulag's spokesperson in the resistance against the Chico River Dam Project
- Macli-ing Dulag (c. 1930 – April 24, 1980) — a pangat (leader) of the Butbut tribe of Kalinga province, killed for his resistance against the Chico River Dam Project
- Ama Lumbaya Gayudan (Lumbaya Aliga Gayudan, May 1, 1935 – January 1, 1984) — a pangat (leader) of the Butbut tribe of Kalinga province, who was key to establishing peace between the Butbut and the Naneng tribes in the 1960s, and in establishing the intertribal peace agreements which would create a united front against the Chico River Dam Project.
- Ernesto Dog-ah Lacbao (May 29, 1942 – June 10, 1980) — a mumbaki of the Kalanguya people, was imprisoned in Camp Holmes (now Camp Bado Dangwa) in La Trinidad, Benguet as response to his resistance to the forced relocation of his village.
- Rashid Lucman (June 23, 1924 – July 21, 1984) — a Maranao legislator, journalist, World War II guerilla hero, and an early proponent of Moro independence or autonomy who is noted to have helped Benigno Aquino Jr. to get back to the Philippines after exile

== See also ==
- Workers' resistance against the Marcos dictatorship
- Religious sector resistance against the Marcos dictatorship
