= Alex Orcullo =

Filipino journalist

- Born: October 19, 1946
- Died: October 19, 1984 (aged 38)
- Cause of death: Shot 13 times from behind by Marcos Martial Law paramilitary personnel
- Occupation: Journalist
- Awards: Honored at the Bantayog ng mga Bayani wall of remembrance

Alexander "Alex" Orcullo (October 19, 1946 – October 19, 1984) was a Filipino journalist, community leader, and activist known for speaking against the abuses of the dictatorship of Ferdinand Marcos, and for being a seminal figure of the protest movement against the Marcos dictatorship in Mindanao, Philippines.

== Journalism in Davao ==
Orcullo was a writer for the San Pedro Express, the editor of Mindanao Currents, and was instrumental in the founding of Mindaweek. His writing and community organizing earned him the ire of the Marcos administration. Before his death, Orcullo was considered to be a strong contender for the mayorship in Davao City.

== Murder ==
On the night of his 38th birthday, October 19, 1984, Orcullo was driving home with his wife Nenen and their two-year-old son was accosted by a government-sponsored paramilitary group called the Philippine Liberation Organization, at a checkpoint in Barangay Tigatto in the Buhangin district of Davao City. After telling Orcullo to alight from his car and then subjecting him to a body search, the men shot Orcullo thirteen times in the back, in front of his wife and child.

The public outrage resulting from his death became an important rallying point of the fight against the Marcos dictatorship in Mindanao, resonating with the assassination of Ninoy Aquino in Luzon the year before.

== Legacy ==
Orcullo is honored as one of the martyrs of martial law whose names are inscribed on the Wall of Remembrance at the Bantayog ng mga Bayani (lit. Memorial of the Heroes) in Quezon City.

== See also ==
- Bantayog ng mga Bayani
- Martial law under Ferdinand Marcos
- Davao City
