= Chico River Dam Project =

Proposed river dam in Luzon, Philippines

The Chico River Dam Project was a proposed hydroelectric power generation project involving the Chico River on the island of Luzon in the Philippines that locals, notably the Kalinga people, resisted because of its threat to their residences, livelihood, and culture. The project was shelved in the 1980s after public outrage in the wake of the murder of opposition leader Macli-ing Dulag. It is now considered a landmark case study concerning ancestral domain issues in the Philippines.

== History ==
=== Proposal ===
A situation report by Joanna Cariño, Jessica Cariño, and Geoffrey Nettleton for the 1979 National Convention of the Ugnayang Pang-Aghamtao (UGAT), Inc. states that opposition for the Chico River Basin Development Project started as early as 1965, upon the initiation of survey work in affected areas. Locals were wary of the destructive implications of the project, having heard of or witnessed the devastating effects of the Binga and Ambuklao dams to the minorities of Benguet. Earlier studies on the project, however, were not deemed feasible because of high estimated construction costs. Activities under the project picked up pace in 1974, at a time when countries around the globe were reeling from the effects of the OPEC Oil Price Hike of 1973. Alternative sources of energy became highly desirable as the price of oil quadrupled. This led the government of President Ferdinand Marcos to tap the German firm Lahmeyer International in cooperation with the Engineering and Development Corporation of the Philippines to develop a technical feasibility study. The Marcos administration then sought funds from the World Bank in order to fund the project.

The plan involved the construction of four dams along the Chico River:

- Chico I was expected to produce 100 Megawatts, with its site in Sabangan, Mountain Province;
- Chico II was expected to produce 360 Megawatts, with its site in Sadanga, Mountain Province;
- Chico III was expected to produce 100 Megawatts, with its site in Barrio Basao in the Municipality of Tinglayan in present-day Kalinga Province; and
- Chico IV was expected to produce 450 Megawatts, with its site in the Barrio of Tomiangan, in Tabuk, now a city in Kalinga.

The technical feasibility study was submitted by Lahmeyer in June 1973 without prior consultation with the indigenous population that was to be displaced by the project. Said population only learned of the study in 1974, when the Marcos government started conducting surveys in preparation for the construction of Chico Dams II and IV.

=== Implications for affected communities ===
Even if only Dam IV were built, the project's watershed would have encompassed the municipalities of Tinglayan, Lubuagan, Pasil, and parts of Tabuk in Kalinga Province, and the municipalities of Sabangan, Sagada, Sadanga, Bontoc, Bauko, and parts of Barlig in Mountain Province. Contemporary estimates suggest that the project would have displaced about 100,000 Kalingas and Bontoks. In Kalinga, the barrios of Ableg, Cagaluan, Dupag, Tanglag, Dognac, and Mabongtot would be completely submerged. The Kalinga Apayao government estimated that more than 1000 families would be rendered homeless as a result, and P31,500,000 worth of farmlands would be lost. An additional P 38,250,000 worth of rice fields farmed by the residents of Bangad, Lubuagan, Dangtalan, Guinaang, and Naneng would also be flooded, even if the villages themselves would not be submerged.

The Marcos government offered various financial incentives if the communities agreed to be relocated, but these overtures were rejected by the communities because of the significance of the lands to their religious beliefs and to the legal system that shaped the relationship of their tribes and communities to one another.

The indigenous religious beliefs of the Kalinga place a strong emphasis on ancestor worship, and because these ancestors were buried within the communities themselves, the communities were essentially sacred burial grounds. Macli-ing Dulag, pangat (leader) of the Butbut people of Kalinga, is quoted by journalist Ma. Ceres Doyo expressing this sentiment:

...the question of the dam is more than political. The question is life—our Kalinga life. Apo Kabunian, the Lord of us all, gave us this land. It is sacred, nourished by our sweat. It shall become even more sacred when it is nourished by our blood.

In addition, legal and tribal relationships among Kalinga communities are expressed in peace pacts called bodong, which together form a system of laws and agreements (pagta ti bodong) that are defined by each tribe's geographical territory. This entire system of laws and the social organization built around them would effectively be abolished if the communities are submerged or their populations relocated.

=== Early opposition against the dam ===
In 1974, the National Power Corporation (NAPOCOR) began sending survey teams to the four dam sites, and opposition against the project began to mount. Macli-ing organized a bodong (peace council) in Barrio Tanglag in an attempt to rally opposition against the dam project.

In May 1975, 150 papangat or village elders and peace makers from Kalinga and Bontoc created the Bodong Federation, Inc., which intended to work against the four hydroelectric dams that would deluge many Kalinga villages, including sacred burial grounds and rice terraces. This was the first time the Bontoc and Kalinga joined intertribal forces and declared their preparedness for armed resistance to defend their ancestral territory. Their plight was supported by many nongovernment organizations and religious groups such as the Episcopal Commission on Tribal Filipinos of the Catholic Bishops' Conference of the Philippines, which helped organize a conference involving 150 Bontoc and Kalinga leaders alongside church-based support groups, at St. Bridget's School in Quezon City. The conference resulted in an agreement (Pagta ti Bodong) which formally united the Bontoc and Kalinga peoples in opposition against the Marcos dam project. Various volunteers such as Catholic social worker Puri Pedro came to the areas resisting the project, in an effort to help by providing key social services in the community.

These early opposition efforts forced the Marcos administration to temporarily pull the NAPOCOR survey teams out of the area in 1975.

=== Militarization of the Chico IV Area ===
Frustrated by the project delays caused by the opposition, Ferdinand Marcos issued Presidential Decree no. 848 in December 1975, constituting the municipalities of Lubuagan, Tinglayan, Tanudan, and Pasil into a "Kalinga Special Development Region" (KSDR), in an effort to neutralize opposition to the Chico IV dam.

With the Philippines formally under Martial Law from 1972 to 1981, areas affected by the dam project were easily militarized. Aside from the Philippine Constabulary forces already assigned to the province, the 60th Philippine Constabulary Brigade, the 51st Philippine Constabulary Brigade, and the 44th Philippine Army Brigade were brought in to suppress opposition to the dam project.

In 1977, numerous opposition leaders—including tribal leaders Lumbaya Aliga Gayudan, Macli-ing Dulag, and even a 12-year-old child —were rounded up by these forces and incarcerated for up to two months.

Opposition leaders were undaunted, and more bodong peace pacts ceremonies were organized - including two of the largest bodong councils ever, in June 1978, and December 1979. The December 1979 bodong was attended by 2,000 Kalingas and Bontocs and saw Macli-ing Dulag officially designated as the official spokesperson for the opposition effort.

=== The Murder of Macli-ing Dulag and aftermath ===
On 24 April 1980, armed forces under the command of then-President Ferdinand Marcos—identified in the press as elements from 4th Infantry Division of the Philippine Army—opened fire on Dulag at his home, killing him instantly.

Macli-ing Dulag's murder became a turning point in the history of Martial Law, because for the first time since the press crackdown during the declaration of Martial Law in 1972, the mainstream Philippine press confronted the issue of the Military's arrests of civilians under Martial Law.

=== Abandonment of the project ===
Macli-ing's murder unified the various peoples of the Cordillera Mountains against the proposed dam, causing both the World Bank and the Marcos regime to eventually abandon the project a few years after.

=== Modern revival and controversy ===
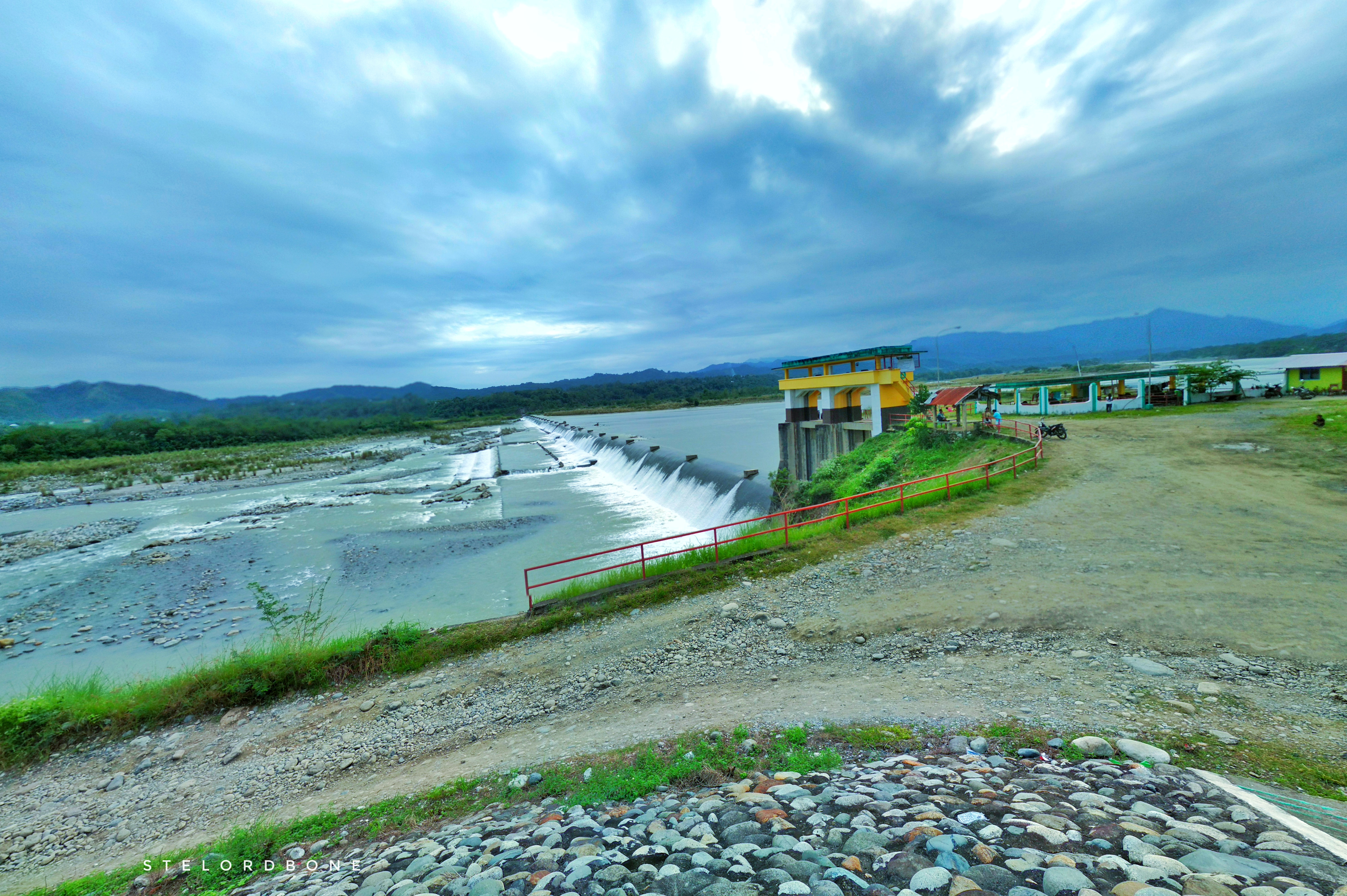
Chico River Pump Irrigation Project in 2017

Debate over damming or altering the Chico River has been recharged by the Chico River Pump Irrigation Project in the 21st century. The Indigenous people in Kalinga have vocally protested the project, that this might inundate their ancestral villages and farmlands. In 2019, the Department of Labor and Employment slapped a penalty of ₱250,000 on China CAMC Engineering Co. Ltd., the contractor for the irrigation project, for the illegal employment of 25 Chinese workers without proper work permits. Historically, Indigenous resistance to the original dam proposals was deeply influenced by the bodong (peace-pact) system—a native Kalinga political institution. Scholarly research reveals that bodong was vital for local community coordination as peace-pact leaders were among those who guided the resistance, sabotage, and public mobilization.

== Monuments and memorials ==
The names of Macli-ing Dulag, Pedro Dungoc, and Ama Lumbaya Gayudan, fellow Kalinga leader of the opposition movement, have since been inscribed on the Wall of Remembrance of the Bantayog ng mga Bayani (Monument of Heroes) in Quezon City, Metro Manila, which is dedicated to the martyrs and heroes who fought against the abuses that took place during the Philippines under the Marcos Martial Law era. April 24, the date of Dulag's murder, is one of two dates observed annually as "Cordillera Day" in the Cordillera Administrative Region.

A monument to honor Kalinga and Bontoc martyrs who fought against the Marcos dictatorship's dam projects was erected in 2017. The monument was built by indigenous communities on ancestral lands in Bugnay, Tinglayan.

== In popular media ==
- The story of Macli-ing Dulag's opposition to the Chico River Dam Project features prominently as a plot point in Auraeus Solito's 2008 film "Pisay, which is set in the Philippine Science High School in Quezon City during the months leading up to the 1986 EDSA Revolution."
- The struggle of the Kalinga people opposing the construction of the Chico River Dam was depicted in the 1988 play Macli-ing Dulag. It was written by Malou Leviste Jacob and staged by the Philippine Educational Theater Association (PETA) under the direction of Soxy Topacio. Nanding Josef played Kalinga chief Macli-ing Dulag.

== See also ==
- Macli-ing Dulag
- New Centennial Water Source-Kaliwa Dam Project
- Proposed Dams in the Kaliwa River watershed
- Water supply and sanitation in the Philippines
- Energy in the Philippines
