= Macli-ing Dulag =

Filipino igorot leader and activist (1930–1980)

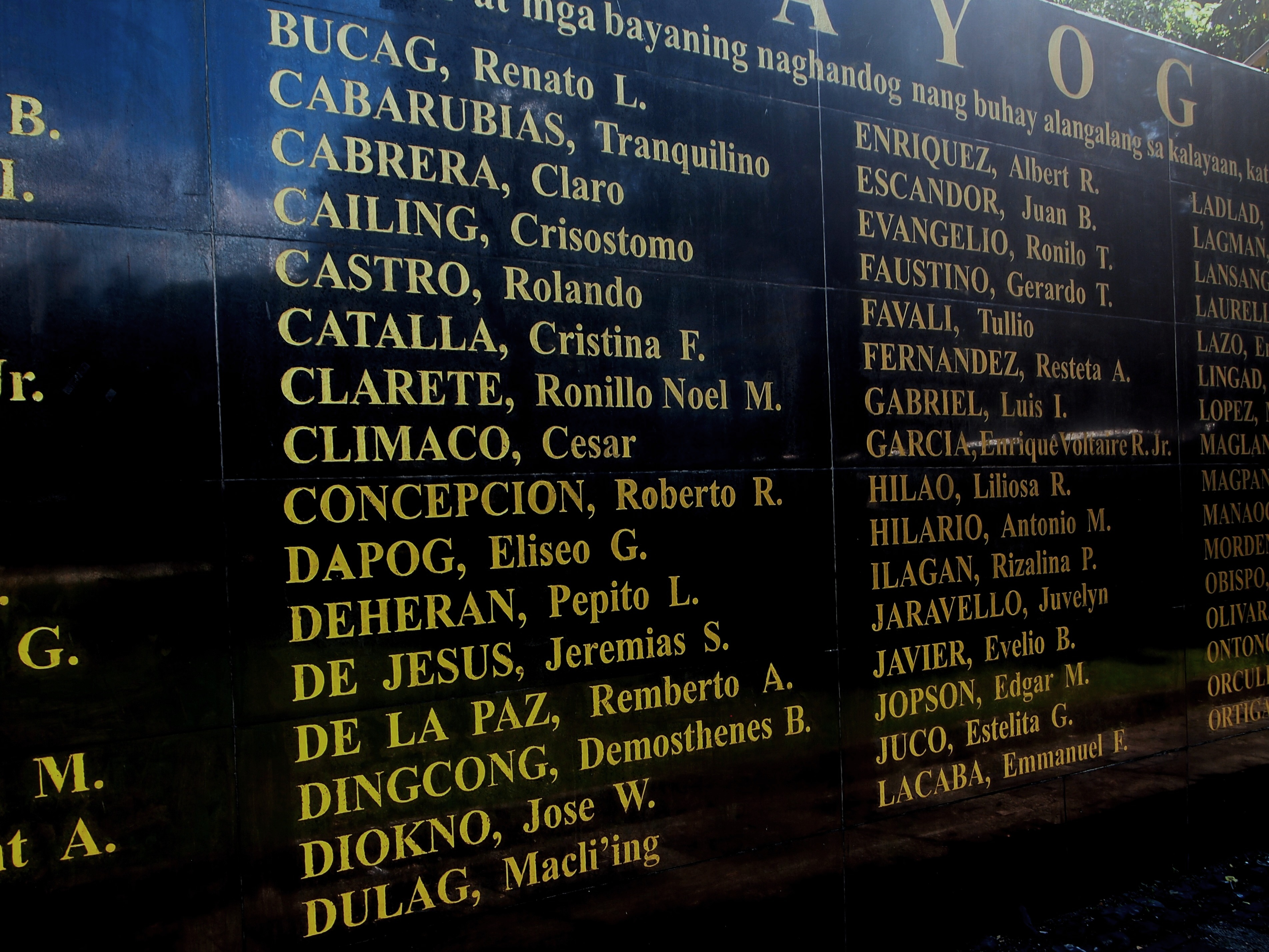
- Detail of the Wall of Remembrance at the Bantayog ng mga Bayani, showing names from the first batch of Bantayog Honorees, including that of Macli-ing Dulag
- Born: April 13, 1930; Tinglayan, Mountain Province, Philippine Islands
- Died: April 24, 1980 (aged 50)
- Occupation: Pangat (leader) of the Butbut tribe of Kalinga province
- Awards: Honored at the Bantayog ng mga Bayani wall of remembrance

Macli-ing Dulag (customarily referred to by his first name, also spelled Macliing or Macli'ing (April 13, 1930 – April 24, 1980) was a pangat (leader) of the Butbut tribe of Kalinga province in the Philippines. He is best known as one of the leaders of the opposition to the Chico River Dam Project, which led to his assassination by armed forces under the command of then-president Ferdinand Marcos.

Because his murder was a watershed moment that united the peoples of the Cordillera in opposition against the dam, Macli-ing Dulag is among the most well known of the many victims of Martial law under Ferdinand Marcos, and his name is inscribed on the Bantayog ng mga Bayani's Wall of Remembrance memorial in Quezon City.

== Early life and family ==
There are no records documenting Macli-ing Dulag's date of birth, but he was born in the highland village of Bugnay, Tinglayan, Kalinga-Apayao, and the accounts of his contemporaries in Bugnay indicate that he was in his early twenties during World War II, when he served as a porter to guerilla forces fighting against the Japanese forces. As was usual among the Butbut people at the time, he did not receive any formal schooling, although he learned how to sign his name.

== Early leadership roles ==
Like the majority of Kalinga people of the time, Macli-ing earned his living through farming, although at one point briefly took on a job as a "caminero" (road maintenance worker) for the Department of Public Works and Highways. By the 1960s, he had become a respected pangat (leader) among the Butbut people, who lived in the villages of Bugnay, Buscalan, Lokong, Ngibat and Butbut in the Municipality of Tinglayan, Kalinga.

He was elected to three terms as barrio captain of Bugnay. One contemporary noted: "No adda riribuk dagiti agkakailian dagdagusenna't tumulong nga mangibanag kadagitoy. (He did not hesitate to lose a day's work to settle disputes among his people.)"

== Opposition to the Chico River Dam Project ==
=== Early opposition ===
In 1974, residents of Sadanga, Mountain Province and Tinglayan, Kalinga were surprised when teams from the National Power Corporation (NAPOCOR) began appearing in their villages, conducting preparatory surveys for the Chico River Dam Project of then-President Ferdinand E. Marcos. They had not been consulted when a technical feasibility study for the project had been completed a year before, in 1973.

The communities, composed of indigenous Kalinga and Bontoc people, objected to the project when they learned that the project called for the construction of four hydroelectric dams along the Chico River, with the priority being the construction of the Chico II dam in Sadanga, and the Chico IV dam in Tinglayan. The UN special rapporteur on the rights of indigenous peoples later estimated that 300,000 people would have been affected by the project.

As a pangat of the Butbut, Macli-ing was one of the first leaders to oppose the project, organizing a bodong (peace council) in Barrio Tanglag in 1974 as an attempt to rally opposition against the dam.

In May 1975, the Episcopal Commission on Tribal Filipinos of the Catholic Bishops' Conference of the Philippines helped organize another bodong involving 150 Bontoc and Kalinga leaders alongside church-based support groups, at St. Bridget's School in Quezon City. The Quezon City bodong resulted in an agreement (Pagta ti Bodong) which united the Bontoc and Kalinga people in opposition against the dam and the Marcos Administration. These early opposition efforts forced the Marcos administration to temporarily pull the NAPOCOR survey teams out of the area in 1975.

=== Militarization of Chico IV areas ===
Frustrated by the project delays caused by the opposition, Ferdinand Marcos issued Presidential Decree no. 848 in December 1975, constituting the municipalities of Lubuagan, Tinglayan, Tanudan, and Pasil into a "Kalinga Special Development Region" (KSDR), in an effort to neutralize opposition to the Chico IV dam.

Marcos had placed the entirety of the Philippines under Martial Law in 1972, so the areas affected by the dam project were easily militarized. Aside from the provincial constabulary forces, paramilitary units (the infamously violent Civilian Home Defense Forces) were activated in communities opposed to the dam. By 1976, the 60th Philippine Constabulary (PC) Brigade had been brought into the Chico IV area to suppress opposition to the dam project.

Empowered by Martial Law to conduct warrantless arrests, the 60th PC Brigade had arrested at least 150 locals by April 1977, accusing them of supposed subversion and of obstructing government projects, and various other offenses such as boycotting the October 1976 Constitutional Referendum. Individuals arrested included tribal papangat (leaders/elders), young couples, and in at least one case, a 12-year-old child. Macli-ing was one of 16 Bugnay villagers incarcerated for two months by the PC that year. Pressure from groups such as Amnesty International finally forced the PC to release these prisoners - some of whom had been incarcerated for 8 months - in June 1977.

By December 1978, parts of the Chico IV area had been declared "free fire zones", no-man's-land areas where the army could freely fire on any animals or permit-less humans at will. The 51st Philippine Constabulary Brigade was brought in from the conflict area in Sulu, to replace the 60th.

Macli-ing and the other opposition leaders were undaunted, and more bodong pacts ceremonies were organized - including two of the largest bodong councils ever, in June 1978, and December 1979. The December 1979 bodong was attended by 2,000 Kalingas and Bontocs and saw Macli-ing officially designated as the official spokesperson for the opposition effort.

Furthering the militarization of Tomiangan, the Philippine Constabulary forces were replaced by the 44th Army Infantry Brigade, which had previously been assigned to Isabela.

=== Bribery attempts ===
Even as the armed forces were focused harassing the Bontoc and Kalinga into relinquishing their lands, government officials also attempted to get the locals to leave by bribing tribal leaders, achieving only a little success.

Since Macli-ing was a prominent figure within the opposition, many of the Marcos administrations' efforts at bribing the opposition focused on him. He was offered a plush job as coordinator of the KSDR, which would have given him a large monthly salary, but he rejected the offer. In another instance, he was invited to a meeting at the Panamin Foundation headquarters; upon arriving he was shocked when he was led to a room full of "young and beautiful women," and told to "choose one for the night." He refused and asked to be allowed to leave.

The best known of these bribery attempts describes a meeting between Macli-ing and Manuel Elizalde Jr., the Presidential Assistant on National Minorities. According to the account documented by Doyo, Elizalde handed Macli-ing an envelope, but Macli-ing refused to accept it, saying:

There can be one of two things in an envelope: letter or money. Since I am illiterate, this is hardly a letter. As for money, it is only given to someone who has something to sell. I have nothing to sell.

== Murder ==
Macli-ing Dulag was assassinated by Marcos-controlled military forces on April 24, 1980.

Eyewitness accounts indicate that ten individuals in military uniforms arrived in Bugnay on two Ford Fiera trucks, seeking out Macli-ing Dulag and Pedro Dungoc Sr., another opposition leader who lived nearby.

The military personnel told Macli-ing to come out, but he refused, telling them to return the following day. He asked his wife to hold the door closed while he secured its lock, and lit a lamp to do so. The light of the lamp allowed the assailants to see where their target was behind the door, and they immediately fired on Macli-ing through a slit under the door, killing him instantly. He sustained a total of ten bullet wounds, with the fatal ones being on the left breast and the right pelvis. At least 13 bullet holes were later found on the door and walls of Macli-ing Dulag's residence, and shell casings from a Browning Automatic Rifle and an M-16 rifle were found.

Dungoc Sr., upon hearing the commotion, immediately arranged his pillows and blanket to make it seem like a person was asleep inside and hid beside it. When men in uniform began shouting in their direction, demanding for them to open the door, his wife answered the door. She pointed to the soldiers where his husband was "sleeping," and the soldiers opened fire upon the rolled-up blanket. Dungoc Sr. managed to escape with only a minor hit on the wrist.

== Aftermath ==
=== Trial of Macli-ing Dulag's murderers ===
His attackers were eventually identified as men under the command of Lieutenant Leodegario Adalem of the 44th Infantry Battalion, a graduate of the Philippine Military Academy's class of 1978. (Adalem and his men were identified more broadly in most media reports as elements of the "4th Infantry Division").

Under pressure from the international community to solve Macli-ing's murder, the Ministry of National Defense informed Amnesty International in 1981 that it had recommended the filing of cases against Adalem, two sergeants, and two draftees, the "reversion to inactive duty" of another (unspecified) officer and three of his men, and the administrative reprimand of the commander of the 44th Infantry Battalion, although Amnesty International was unable to ascertain whether these recommendations had been acted upon.

In August 1980, Adalem, along with Sgt. Angeles Tanag anad draftees Francisco Garcia and Robino Galleno, were detained for their involvement in the murder. They were later brought before a court martial at Martinez Hall in Camp Henry T. Allen in Baguio City. Adalem and Tanag were charged for violation of Articles of War No. 94, which covers murder, frustrated murder and robbery. The other two draftees were not charged. They were later found guilty, but Adalem was later covertly reinstated in the army. Later, however, Adalem was restored to active duty and was eventually able to retire with the rank of Major in the Philippine Army. He was killed in an ambush in April 2000.

=== Impact on Martial Law press coverage ===
Coverage of Macli-ing's murder proved to be a watershed moment in the mainstream press' coverage of Martial Law. The story of Macli-ing's murder was most actively pursued by journalist Ma Ceres P. Doyo and playwright Rene O. Villanueva, who got the story out in the press, and were interrogated by the military as a result. Editor Leonor Aureus, writing in 1985 for the National Press Club, noted that in the decade since 1972, there had been "no open and serious confrontation between the [mainstream] press and the military following the wave of arrests after martial law was declared."

=== Abandonment of the dam project ===
Macli-ing Dulag's murder unified the various peoples of the Cordillera Mountains against the proposed dam, causing both the World Bank and the Marcos regime to eventually abandon the project a few years after.

== Legacy ==
Dulag's name is inscribed on the Bantayog ng mga Bayani (Monument of the Heroes) Wall of Remembrance in Quezon City, Metro Manila, which is dedicated to victims of extrajudicial killings since the Martial Law era.

April 24, the date of Dulag's murder, is one of two days observed annually as "Cordillera Day" in the Cordillera Administrative Region.

== In art and popular media ==
The Philippine Educational Theater Association (PETA) portrayed the life of Macli-ing Dulag and the horrors of martial law in the 1988 play Macli-ing Dulag. It was written by Malou Leviste Jacob and directed by Soxy Topacio. It starred Nanding Josef in the title role. Writer-director Dennis N. Marasigan lists it as one of 14 essential plays on martial law in the Philippines.

"Dumaloy ang Ilog Chico" ("And so the Chico River Flows") is a 1995 children's book narrating the campaign to defend the Kalinga community against soldiers and foreign contractors. It was written by Judy Cariño and Rene Villanueva and illustrated by Bernie Solina. It was one of the stories about Dulag recited at the Philippine Daily Inquirer's Read-Along session in Surigao del Sur in 2015.

The story of Macli-ing Dulag's opposition to the Chico River Dam Project features prominently as a plot point in Auraeus Solito's 2008 film "Pisay," which is set in the Philippine Science High School in Quezon City during the months leading up to the 1986 EDSA Revolution and the 1997 documentary Batas Militar.

"Ang Pangat, ang Lupang Ninuno at ang Ilog" ("The Chieftain, the Ancestral Land and the River"), written by Luz Maranan, is a story about the chieftain Dulag who led Igorot tribes against the government's dam project during the Marcos regime. The story won third prize in the 2012 Don Carlos Palanca Memorial Awards for Literature.

The University of the Philippines Press published in 2015 Macli-ing Dulag: Kalinga Chief, Defender of the Cordillera, written by journalist Ma. Ceres P. Doyo. The essay on which the book was based led to the author's harassment by the Philippine military in 1980. The original essay won a Catholic Mass Media Award for journalism, handed by Pope John Paul II to Doyo in February 1981.

== See also ==
- Chico River Dam Project
- Bantayog ng mga Bayani
- Religious sector resistance against the Marcos dictatorship
