= Bodong =

Kalinga peace pact

Bodong refers to the peace pact or treaty, used by the Kalinga people in Kalinga Province, northern Philippines. These peace rites are usually accompanied by Kalinga songs such as the ading, wasani and the dandanag. It is a unique judicial system wherein the peace pact holder appointed by the pangat (tribal leaders) of a certain tribe holds a peace agreement with another tribe. In this system, two tribes agree to ally with each other. The bodong is usually worked out in large gatherings between two villages that belong to the same geographic area and shares kinship ties. They call the written laws pagta. The tribes in Kalinga are known for their tribal-wars wherein a life is repayable only with another life. These vengeful tribes will not settle unless the tribe of the person who committed the misdemeanor will surrender or will be killed.

Eduardo Masferré notes that by the start of American colonial period, the neighboring Bontoc and Gaddang people had begun adapting peace pact customs based on the Kalinga Bodong.
