= Kalinga people =

Ethnic group of Philippines

Kalinga
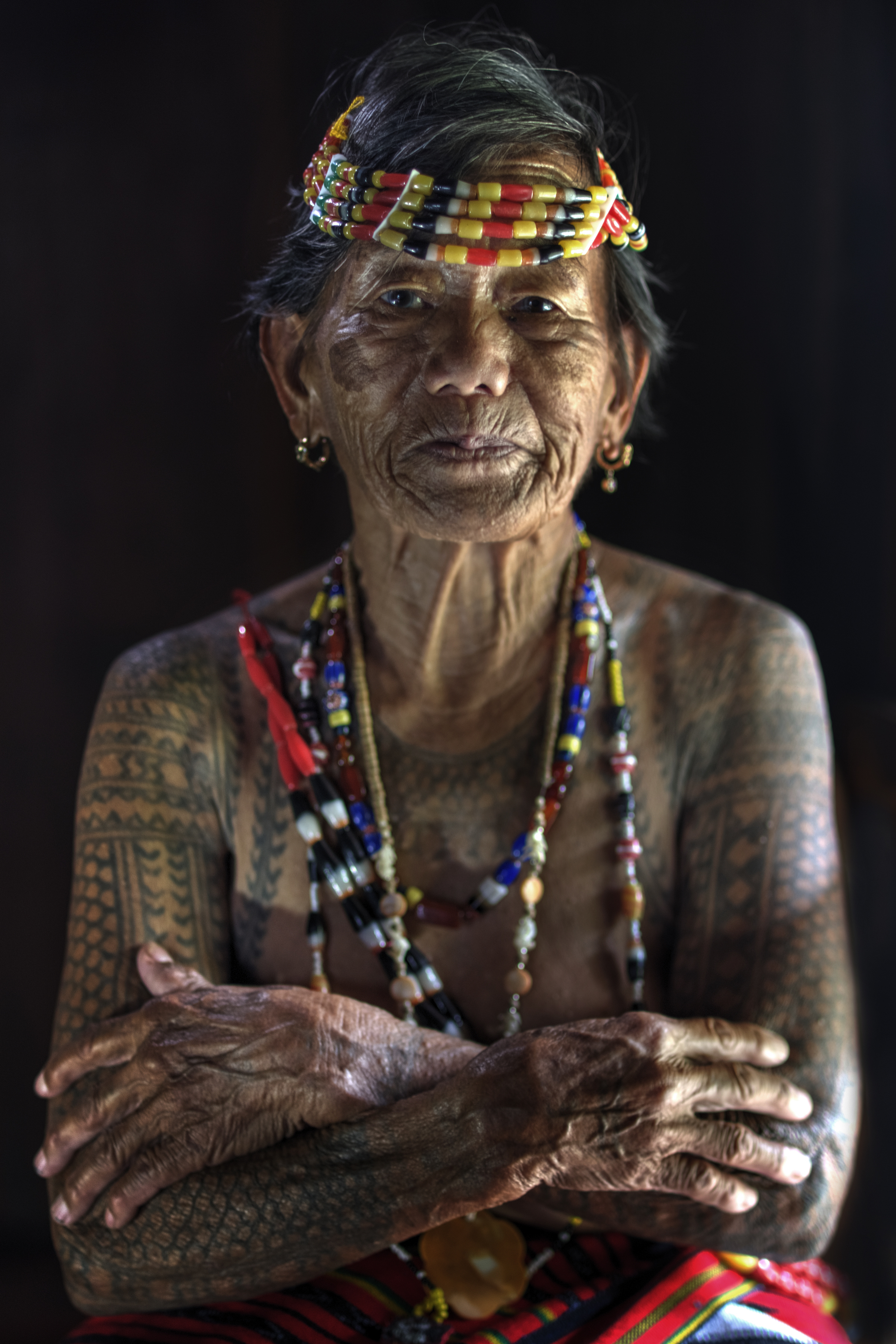
- A Kalinga woman from the Butbut sub-tribe wearing traditional attire from Buscalan, Tinglayan, Kalinga.

Total population
- 211,749 (2020)

Regions with significant populations
- Philippines (Cordillera Administrative Region)

Languages
- Kalinga, Ilocano, Tagalog

Religion
- Christianity, indigenous folk religion, Animism

Related ethnic groups
- Igorot peoples

The Kalinga people (IPA: [ka'liŋɡa]) are an indigenous ethnic group whose ancestral domain is in the Cordillera Mountain Range of the northern Philippines. They are mainly found in Kalinga province which has an area of 3,282.58 sq. km. Some of them, however, already migrated to Mountain Province, Apayao, Cagayan, and Abra. The Kalinga numbered 163,167 as of 2010.

== Sub-tribes ==
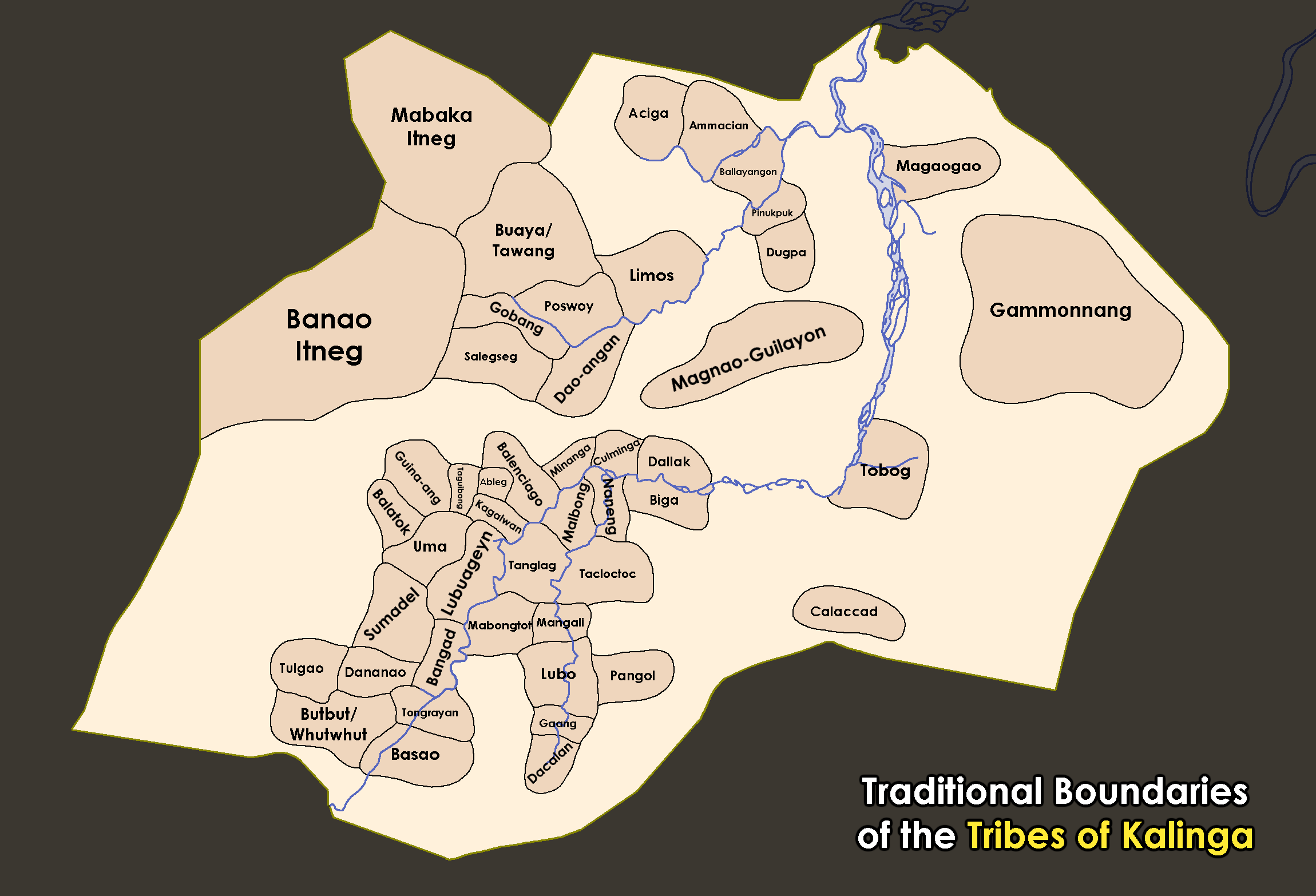
A map of the Kalinga sub-tribes within Kalinga Province.

In the past, various writers studying the Kalinga have sorted them into sub-tribes in various ways. Edward Dozier divided Kalinga geographically into three sub-cultures and geographical position: Balbalan (north); Pasil, Lubuagan, and Tinglayan (south); and Tanudan (east). Rev. Teodoro Llamzon, S.J. divided the Kalinga based on their dialects: Guinaang, Lubuagan, Punukpuk, Tabuk, Tinglayan, and Tanudan.

Ronald Himes (1997) divides the Kalinga language into three dialects: Masadiit (in Abra), Northern Kalinga, and South-Central Kalinga.

More recently, Kalinga author John Donqui-is, in an article published by the Philippines' National Commission for Culture and the Arts, identifies 31 Kalinga subtribes.

To the north of Kalinga province, the NCCA article identifies the Municipality of Balbalan as home to the Alingag (also known as the Salegseg), the Buwaya, the Dao-angan, the Gobang, the Mabaca, and the Banao; while the Municipality of Pinukpuk is home to the Ballayangon, the Limos, and the Gilayon (also known as the Pinukpuk Tabuk).

On the south or southwestern part of the province, the NCCA article says the Municipality of Labuagan is home to the Lubuagan, the Mabongtot, and the Tanglag; the Municipality of Pasil is home to the Ableg, the Balatoc, the Balinciagao, the Guinaang, and the Kagalwan; while the Municipality of Tinglayan is home to the Bangad, the Basaso, the Botbot (or Butbut), the Dananao, the Tinglayan, and the Sumadel.

Lastly, the NCCA article says that to the east of the province, the Municipality of Tanudan is home to the Dacalam, the Lubo, the Mangali, and the Taloctoc; the Municipality of Rizal is home to the Gammonnang; and the City of Tabuk is home to the Biga, the Nanong, and the Calaccad (although the article also identifies the Calaccad as Gaddang).

== Etymology ==
The name Kalinga is actually an exonym which came from the Ibanag and Gaddang term kalinga, which means headhunter.

== Social organization ==
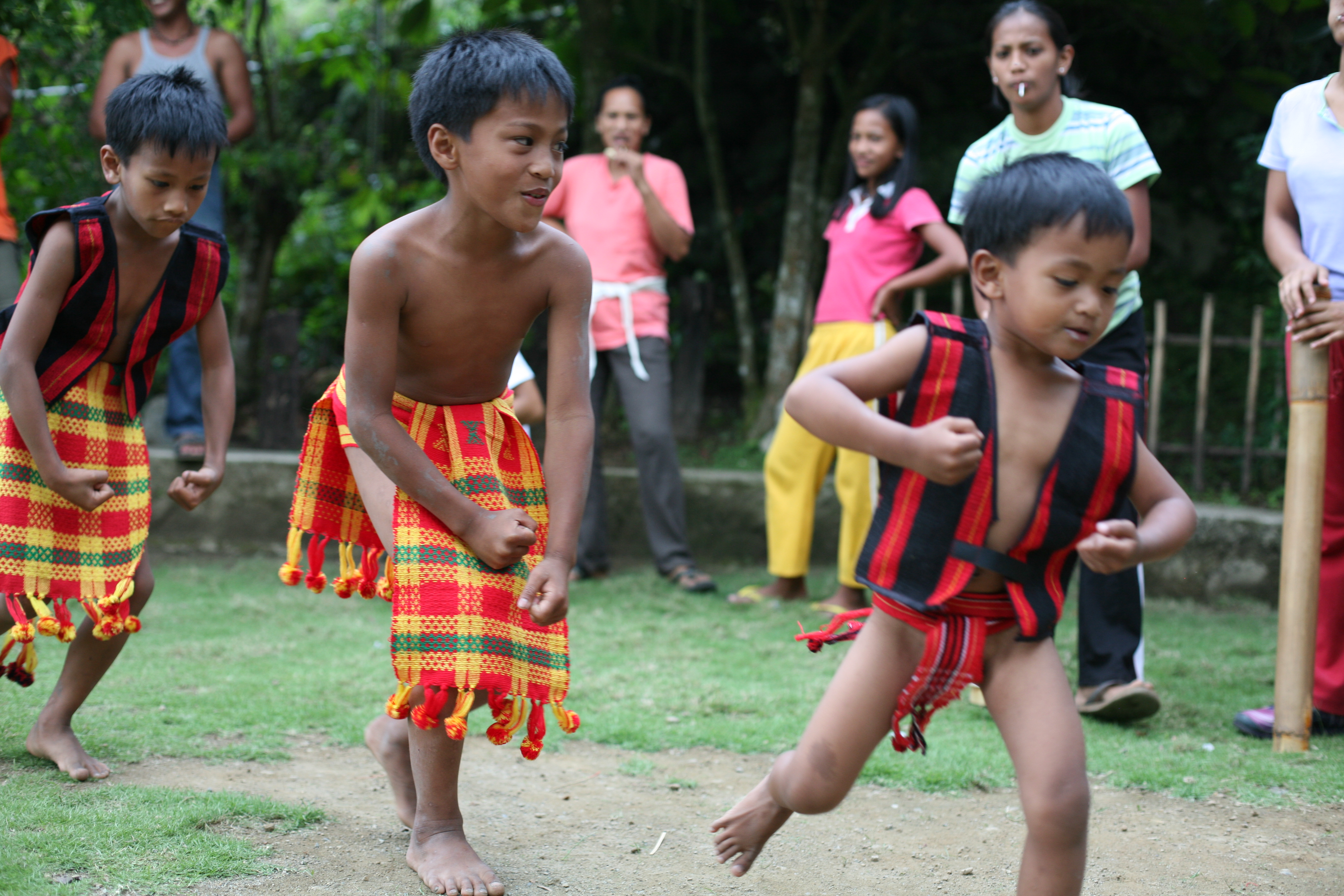
Children from Lubuagan, Kalinga perform the muscle dance.

Like other ethnic groups, families and kinship systems are also important in the social organizations of Kalingas.

They are stratified into two economic classes only which are determined by the number of their rice fields, working animals, and heirlooms: the kapos (poor) and the baknang (wealthy). The wealthy employ servants (poyong).

Politically, the mingol and the papangat have the highest status. The mingols are those who have killed many in headhunting and the papangats are those former mingols who assumed leadership after the disappearance of headhunting. They are usually the peacemakers, and the people ask advice from them, so it is important that they are wise and have good oratorical ability.

=== Bodong ===
The Kalinga developed an institution of peace pacts called Bodong which has minimised traditional warfare and headhunting and serves as a mechanism for the initiation, maintenance, renewal, and reinforcement of kinship and social ties.

Eduardo Masferré notes that by the start of American colonial period, the neighboring Bontoc and Gaddang people had begun adapting peace pact customs based on the Kalinga Bodong.

== Ancestral lands ==
Kalinga territory includes floodplains of Tabuk, and Rizal, plus the Chico River. Gold and copper deposits are common in Pasil and Balbalan.

== History ==
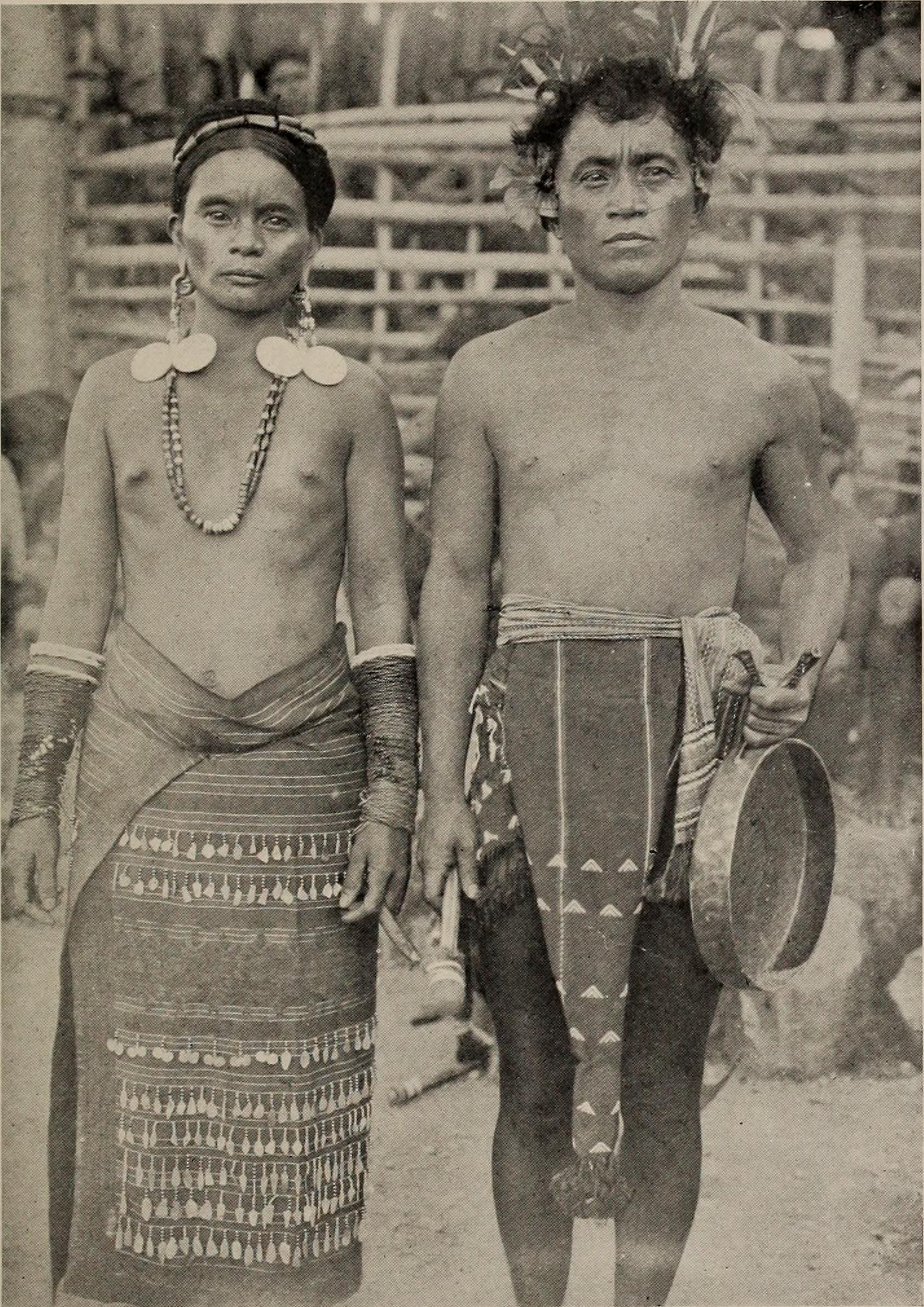
A Kalinga man and woman, circa 1903

Tabuk was settled in the 12th century, and from there other Kalinga settlements spread.

The 1970s marked the heyday of Robusta coffee production in Kalinga province, but a trader monopoly in the 1980s led to prices being kept so low that Kalinga farmers shifted to other crops like Corn. An effort to bring coffee farming to previous levels began decades later, in the 2010s.

The plight of the Kalinga people during the Marcos dictatorship in the 1970s and early 1980s became a widely discussed national issue because of the Kalinga people's ancestral domain conflicts with the Chico River Dam Project, a proposed hydroelectric power generation project which would have encompassed the municipalities of Tinglayan, Lubuagan, Pasil, and parts of Tabuk in Kalinga Province, and the municipalities of Sabangan, Sagada, Sadanga, Bontoc, Bauko, and parts of Barlig in Mountain Province. Contemporary estimates suggest that the project would have displaced about 100,000 Kalingas and Bontoks. Because the great value placed by the Kalinga on their deceased ancestors who were buried within these communities, the issue was not just one of livelihood, but one of sacred grounds. Marcos sent three armed brigades to quell down the protests, resulting in heightened tensions in the area. In 1977 alone, numerous Kalinga dam protesters — including tribal leaders Lumbaya Aliga Gayudan and Macli-ing Dulag, and even a 12-year-old child — were rounded up by these forces and incarcerated for up to two months.

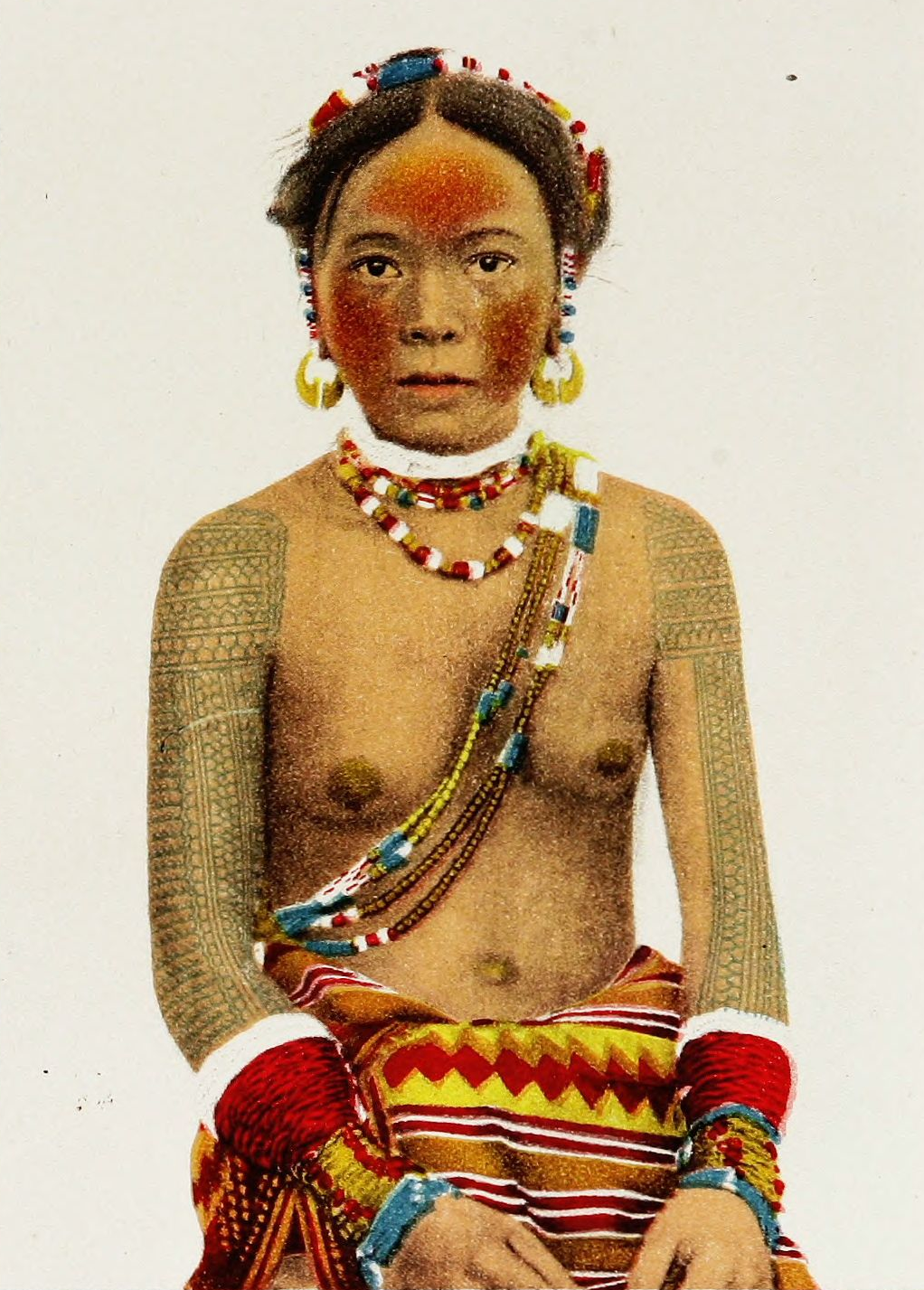
Kalinga woman from Lubuanga circa 1913

The 24 April 1980 murder of Macli-ing Dulag became a turning point when coverage of the murder led to public outrage. It was the first time since the 1972 declaration of Martial Law where the mainstream Philippine press managed to report on the arrests of civilians under Martial Law, and the turn of public opinion against both the Chico River Dam and Martial law, coupled with the united anger of the various peoples of the Cordillera Mountains led the Ferdinand Marcos administration to give up on the dam project. As a result, the Chico River Dam Project is now considered a landmark case study concerning ancestral domain issues in the Philippines.

In 2007, a Discovery Channel series hosted by American anthropologist Lars Krutak featured the tattoo work of Butbut mambabatok Whang-od Oggay. This was the start of even more media attention focused on Whang-od, bringing the Kalinga tattoo art to global attention.

== Agriculture ==
=== Wet rice and swidden farming ===
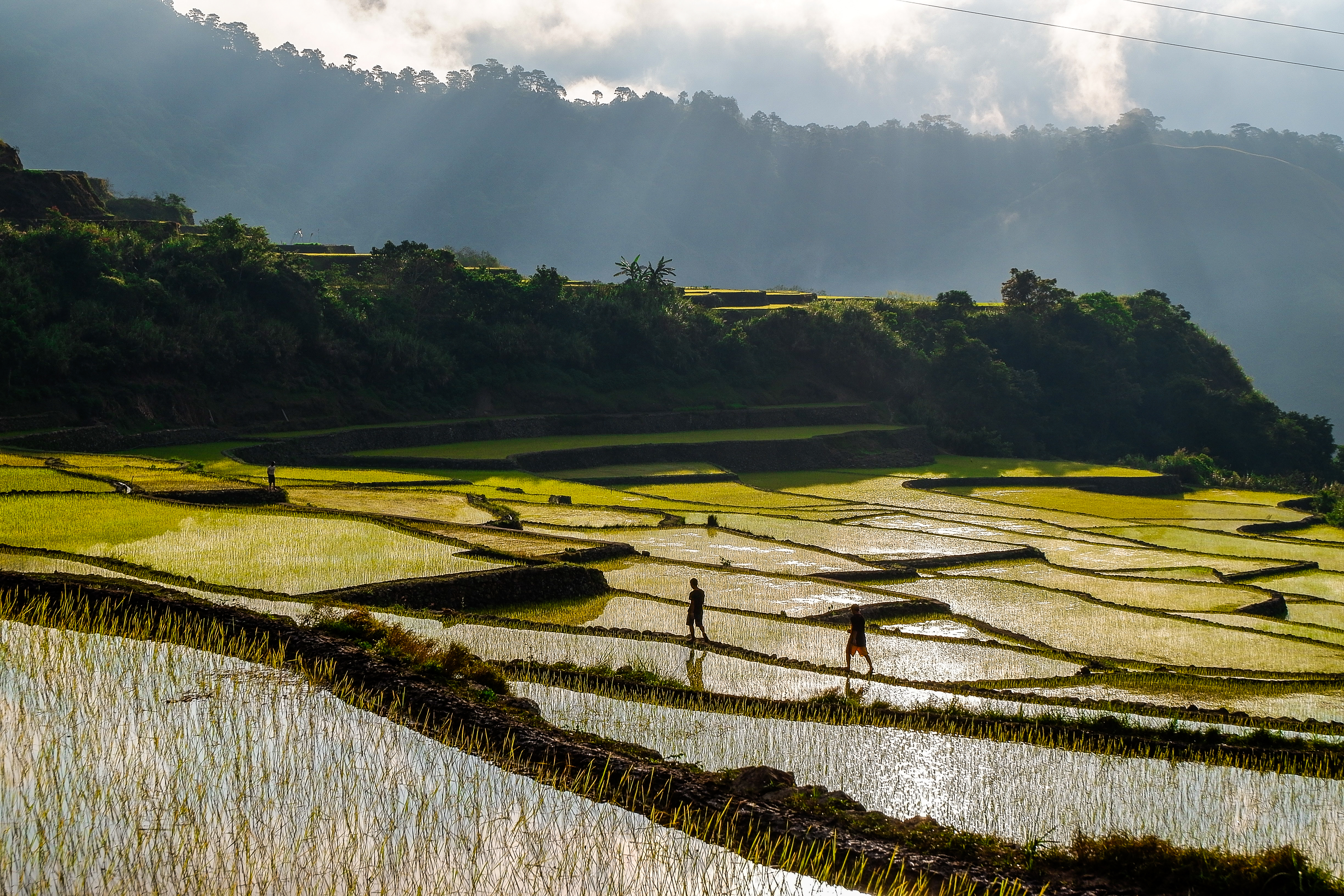
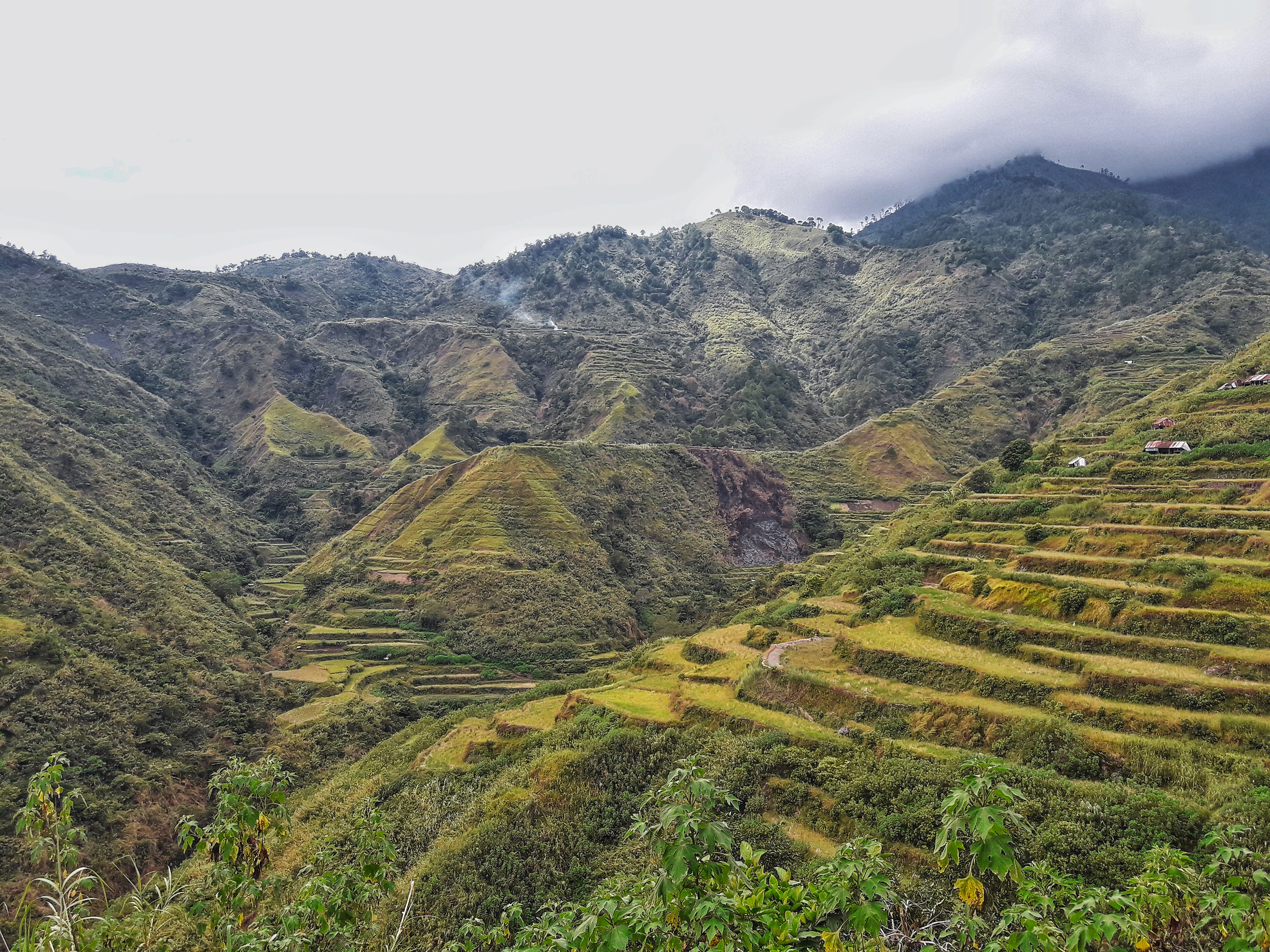
Buscalan Rice Terraces

Traditional agricultural practices involved the cultivation wet rice (papayaw) as well as swidden (uwa) farming. Due to the availability of water, two planting seasons are possible in the kalingas rice terraces. They plant three varieties of rice namely onoy, oyak and dikit/diket. Men also hunt for wild pigs, deer and wild fowl in the forests. Fish, shells and other marine life are caught from rivers, streams and lakes surrounding their area. Fruit trees such as the coconut, coffee and banana are grown in the orchard or kakkaju. Wine (basi) is also made from sugarcane.

=== Coffee ===
Robusta coffee became a popular cash-crop among the Kalinga in the 1970s, although a trader monopoly in the 1980s led to low farmgate prices despite high world market prices, causing a decline in production. In the 2010s, various government agencies encouraged farmers to return to the planting and harvesting of Cordillera Robusta coffee among the Kalinga.

== Customs ==
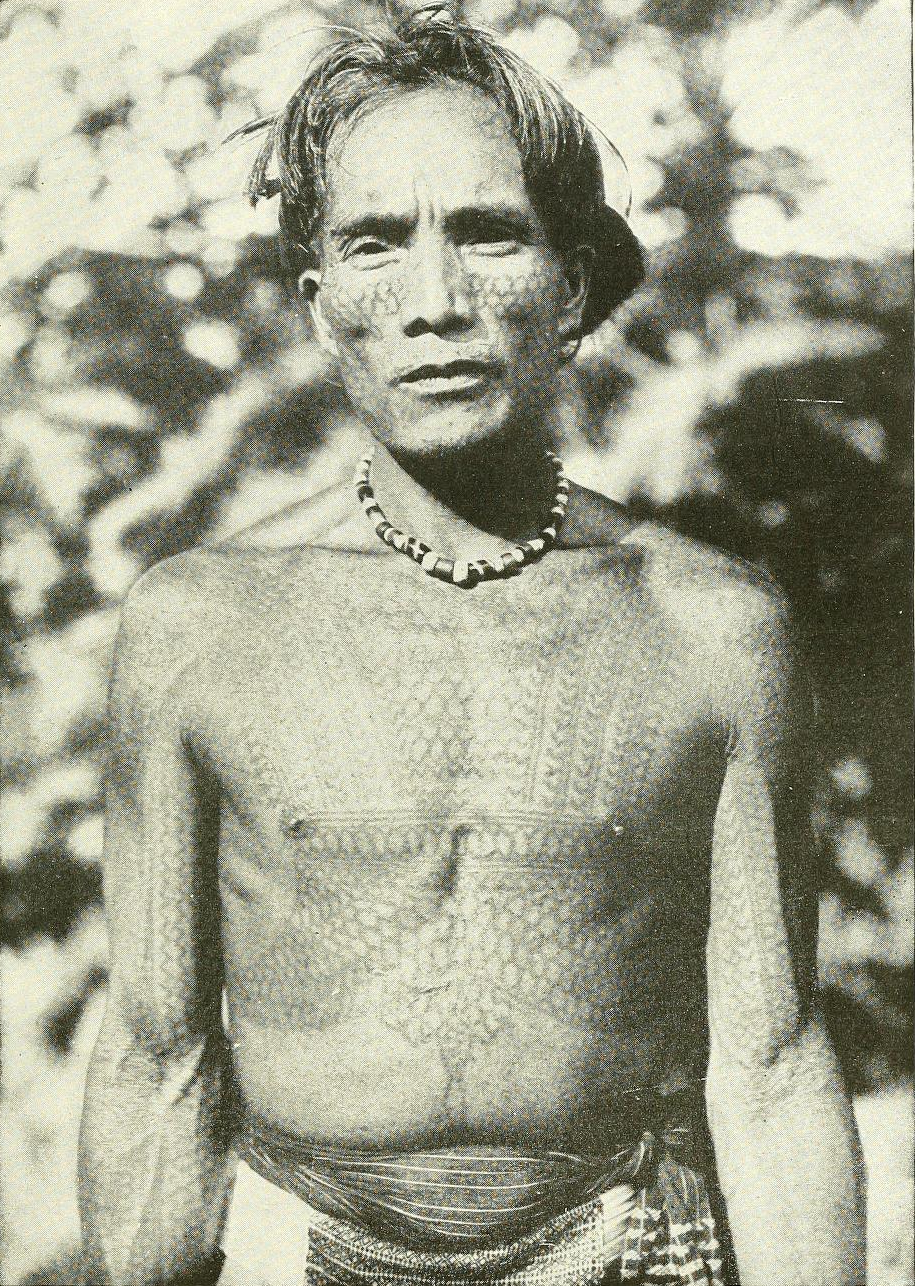
Lakay Wanawan of the Kalinga people (c.1912), a renowned warrior and later a pangat (tribal elder). Note the biking chest tattoos and the face tattoos.

Like other Cordillera ethnic groups, the Kalinga also follow numerous of customs and traditions. For example, pregnant women and their husbands are not allowed to eat beef, cow's milk, and dog meat. They must also avoid streams and waterfalls as these cause harm to unborn children. Other notable traditions are the ngilin (avoiding the evil water spirit) and the kontad or kontid (ritual performed to the child to avoid harms in the future). Betrothals are also common, even as early as birth, but one may break this engagement if he/she is not in favour of it. Upon death, sacrifices are also made in honour of the spirit of the dead and kolias is celebrated after one year of mourning period.

=== Clothing ===
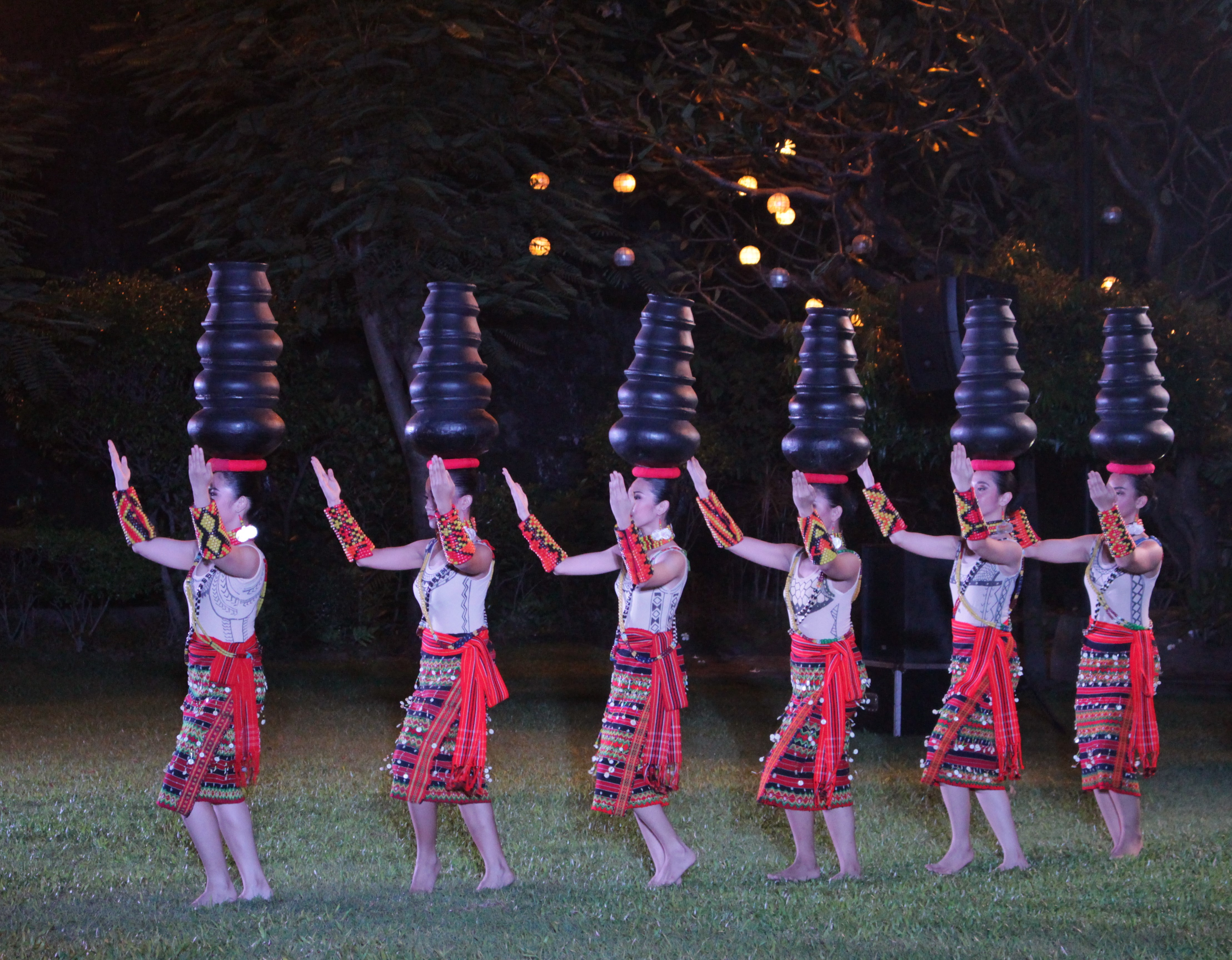
Banga Salidsid (Pot Dance) Kalinga traditional folk dance

Kalinga men wear ba-ag (loincloths) while the women wear saya (colourful garment covering the waist down to the feet). The women are also tattooed on their arms up to their shoulders and wear colourful ornaments like bracelets, earrings, and necklaces, especially on the day of festivities.

Heirlooms include Chinese plates (panay), jars (gosi), and gongs (gangsa). Key dances include the courtship dance (salidsid) and war dance (pala-ok or pattong).

=== Batok (tattooing) ===
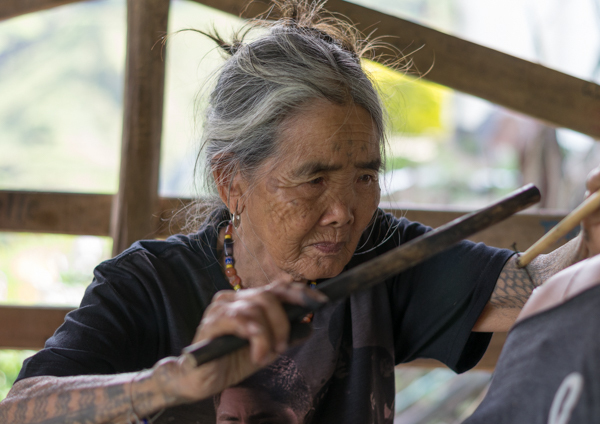
Apo Whang-od applying traditional Kalinga tattoos using the characteristic Austronesian tattooing tools - the hafted needle and the mallet

Tattoos among the Kalinga are known as batok or batek (whatok in Butbut Kalinga). They are among the best known Cordilleran tattoos due to the popularity of Apo Whang-od - once known as the "last mambabatok (tattoo artist)", but currently teaching younger artists to continue the tradition.

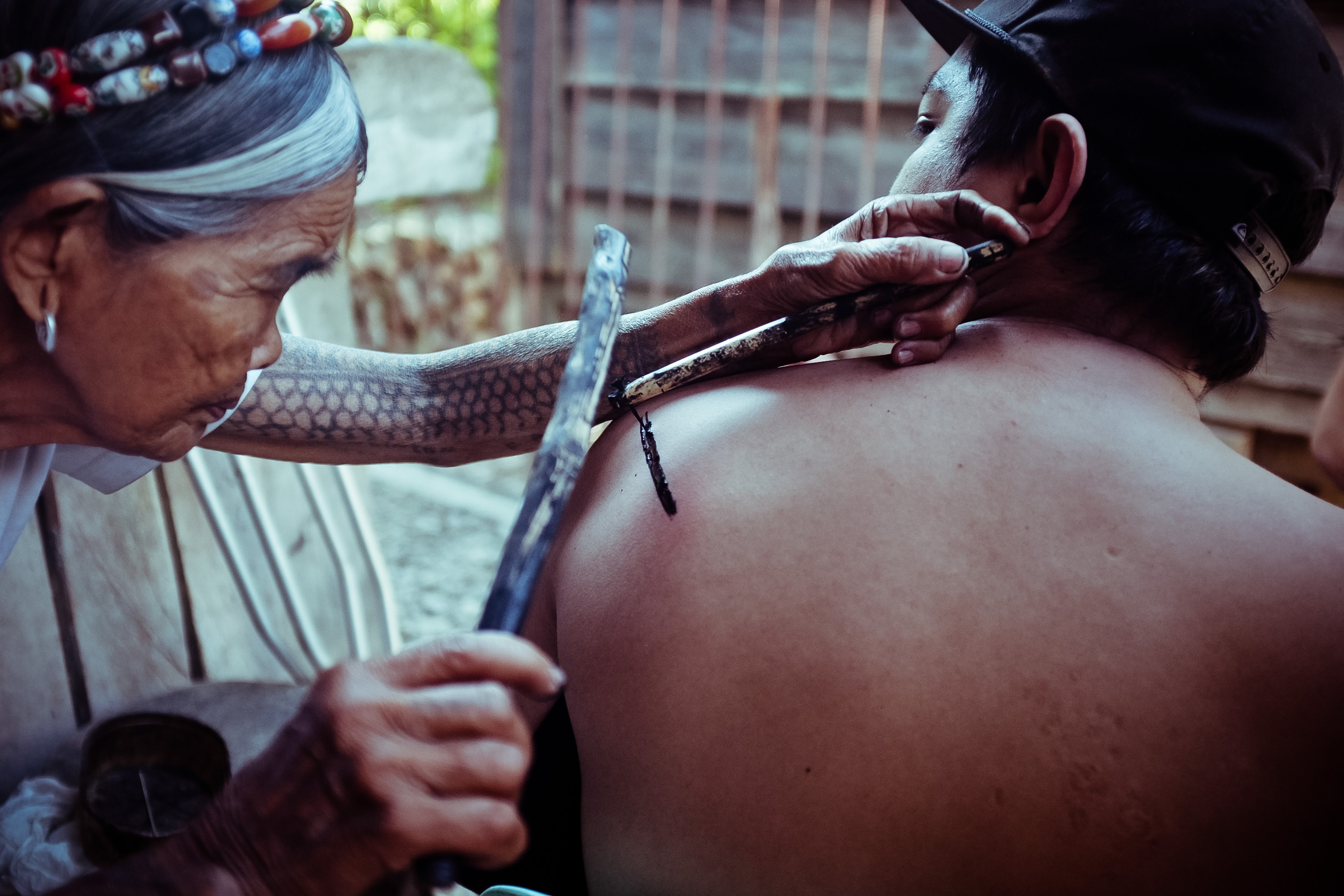
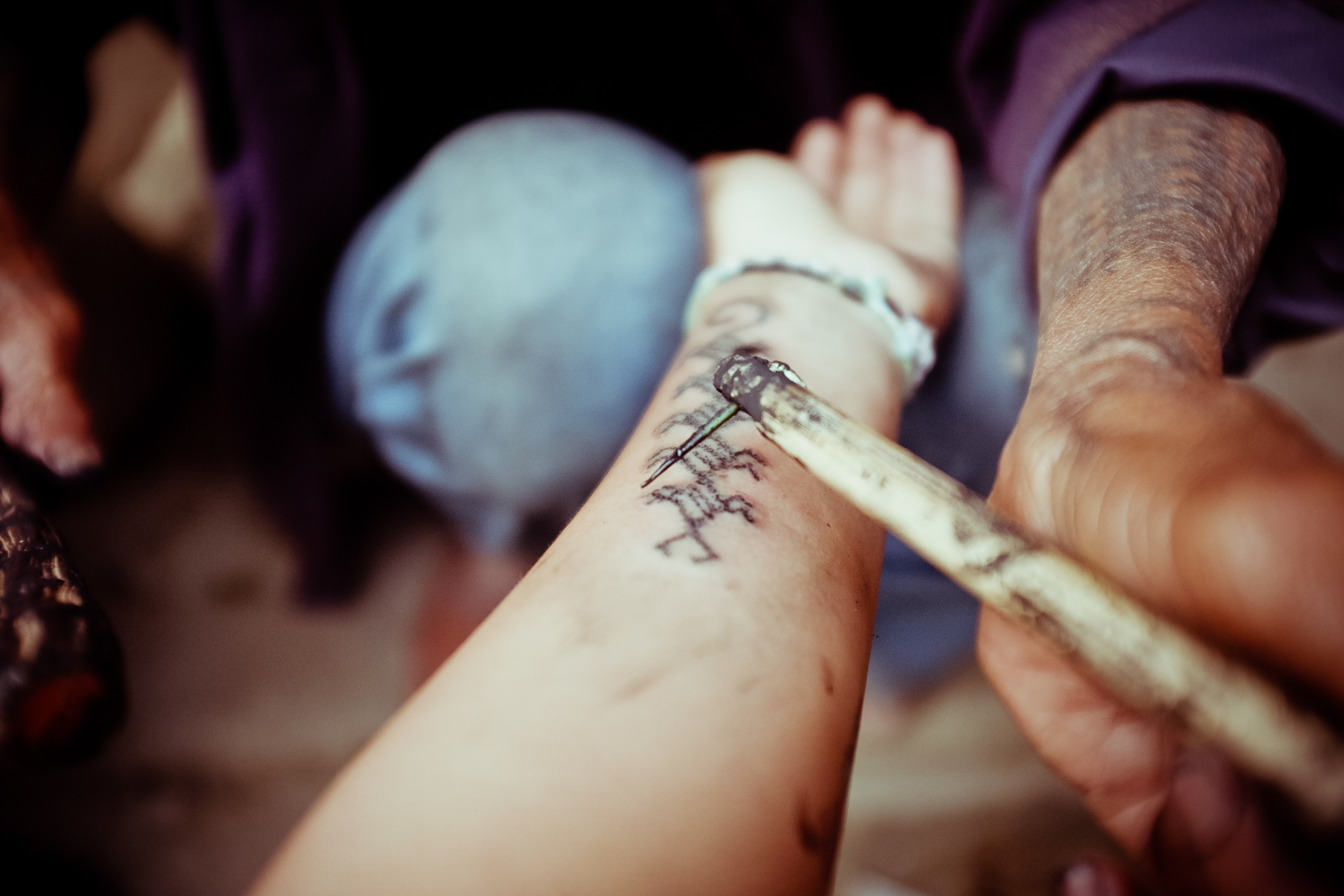
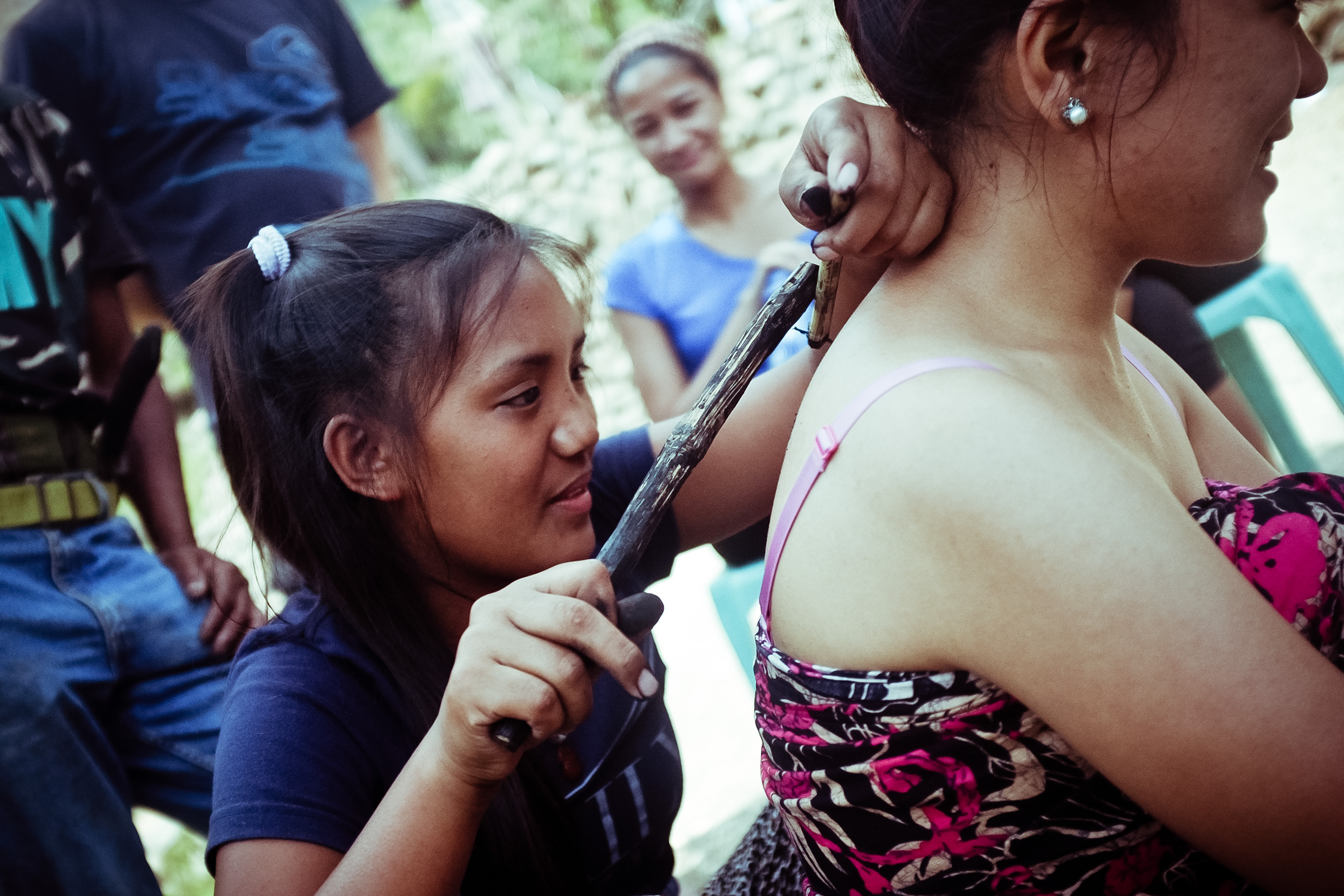

Common Kalinga tattoo motifs include centipedes (gayaman), centipede legs (tiniktiku), snakes (tabwhad), snakeskin (tinulipao), hexagonal shapes representing snake belly scales (chillag), coiled snakes (inong-oo), rain (inud-uchan), various fern designs (inam-am, inalapat, and nilawhat), fruits (binunga), parallel lines (chuyos), alternating lines (sinagkikao), hourglass shapes representing day and night (tinatalaaw), rice mortars (lusong), pig's hind legs (tibul), rice bundles (sinwhuto or panyat), criss-crossing designs (sina-sao), ladders (inar-archan), eagles (tulayan), frogs (tokak), and axe blades (sinawit).

The same designs are used to decorate textiles, pottery, and tools. Each design has different symbolic meanings or magical/talismanic abilities. The tinulipao, for example, is believed to camouflage warriors and protect them from attacks. Ferns indicates that a woman is ready to conceive, enhances their health, and protects against stillbirth. The hourglass and rice mortar designs indicate that a family is wealthy. Rice bundles symbolize abundance.

=== Architecture ===
Kalinga houses (furoy, buloy, fuloy, phoyoy, biloy)are either octagonal for the wealthy, or square, and are elevated on posts (a few as high as 20–30 feet), with a single room. Other building include granaries (alang) and field sheds (sigay).

=== Weapons and tools ===
They use the uniquely shaped Kalinga head ax (sinawit), bolo (gaman/badang), spears (balbog/tubay/say-ang), and shields (kalasag). They also carry a rattan backpack (pasiking) and betel nut bag (buyo).

== Indigenous beliefs ==
The Kalinga believe in a Supreme Being, Kabuniyan, the creator and giver of life, who once lived amongst them. They also believe in numerous spirits and deities, including those associated with nature (pinaing and aran), and dead ancestors (kakarading and anani). The priestess (manganito, mandadawak, or mangalisig) communicates with these spirits.

== See also ==
- Macli-ing Dulag
- Whang-od
- Chico River Dam Project
- Igorot people
