= List of barangays in Mountain Province =

Mountain Province has 144 barangays comprising its 10 municipalities.

== Barangays ==
Most populous in its respective town (as of 2010)

Barangay	Population					Town
Barangay	2010	2007	2000	1995	1990	Town
Abatan	845	869	627	591	603	Bauko
Agawa	431	348	576	489	451	Besao
Aguid	596	513	512	578	607	Sagada
Alab Oriente	848	880	619	580	445	Bontoc
Alab Proper	523	522	937	819	736	Bontoc
Alunogan	975	814	943	951	2,629	Natonin
Ambaguio	349	251	466	339	398	Besao
Ambasing	796	666	675	663	580	Sagada
Anabel	873	853	686	729	537	Sadanga
Angkeling	994	915	886	777	741	Sagada
Anonat	2,265	2,142	1,660	1,560	1,080	Paracelis
Antadao	360	299	397	393	447	Sagada
Bacarni	2,599	2,350	1,612	1,510	906	Paracelis
Bagnen Oriente	689	709	671	643	751	Bauko
Bagnen Proper	750	790	817	888	755	Bauko
Balangao	1,012	1,012	1,065	978	1,120	Natonin
Balaoa	1,157	1,023	989	965	778	Tadian
Balili	403	388	317	298	234	Bontoc
Balintaugan	144	136	182	196	194	Bauko
Balugan	813	765	694	626	591	Sagada
Banaao	885	824	851	827	760	Tadian
Bananao	2,195	1,755	1,497	1,203	1,080	Paracelis
Banao	1,822	1,832	1,642	1,584	1,535	Bauko
Banao	229	285	218	189	355	Natonin
Banawal	2,230	1,667	1,575	1,519	1,006	Natonin
Bangaan	703	711	583	495	402	Sagada
Banguitan	627	550	666	633	618	Besao
Bantay	4,191	3,875	2,628	2,087	2,126	Paracelis
Bantey	695	640	631	657	598	Tadian
Bao-angan	361	343	307	317	331	Sabangan
Batayan	713	610	666	588	618	Tadian
Bayyo	282	357	505	527	512	Bontoc
Bekigan	584	703	570	600	492	Sadanga
Belwang	1,210	1,404	1,231	1,523	1,078	Sadanga
Besao East (Besao Proper)	356	323	625	574	503	Besao
Besao West	493	455	720	602	593	Besao
Betwagan	2,298	2,325	1,974	1,744	1,606	Sadanga
Bila (Bua)	1,204	1,150	1,251	1,118	890	Bauko
Bontoc Ili	4,987	4,973	4,560	4,014	3,220	Bontoc
Bun-ayan	915	846	815	950	873	Sabangan
Bunga	732	648	686	543	514	Tadian
Bunot	1,693	2,065	1,743	1,377	1,324	Paracelis
Buringal	2,372	2,133	1,936	1,518	1,247	Paracelis
Busa	332	321	363	336	307	Sabangan
Butac	648	656	592	756	711	Natonin
Butigue	2,933	2,689	2,055	1,884	1,458	Paracelis
Cadad-anan	1,234	1,509	1,150	753	514	Tadian
Cagubatan	934	693	791	698	601	Tadian
Calutit	2,510	2,969	1,494	1,687	1,295	Bontoc
Camatagan	785	834	694	730	663	Sabangan
Caneo	616	679	600	401	448	Bontoc
Capinitan	573	596	586	627	527	Sabangan
Catengan	733	727	775	769	741	Besao
Chupac	642	687	708	692	547	Barlig
Dacudac	1,888	1,198	1,279	1,129	731	Tadian
Dagdag (Poblacion)	814	834	647	719	639	Sagada
Dalican	990	759	1,149	1,035	935	Bontoc
Data	744	835	762	781	745	Sabangan
Demang	904	897	1,109	990	929	Sadanga
Demang (Poblacion)	758	630	626	698	712	Sagada
Duagan	287	275	280	293	293	Tadian
Fiangtin	570	610	467	648	531	Barlig
Fidelisan	462	441	402	408	369	Sagada
Gawana (Poblacion)	759	858	799	989	769	Barlig
Gayang	437	400	449	403	421	Sabangan
Gonogon	659	677	775	785	589	Bontoc
Gueday	748	665	1,189	1,103	1,070	Besao
Guinaang	1,457	1,591	1,490	1,481	1,170	Bontoc
Guinzadan Central	1,112	1,118	1,021	854	775	Bauko
Guinzadan Norte	1,088	1,103	1,103	1,076	902	Bauko
Guinzadan Sur	1,859	1,760	1,685	1,634	1,437	Bauko
Kaleo	796	775	972	1,204	1,134	Barlig
Kayan East	896	833	969	845	846	Tadian
Kayan West	949	669	736	640	576	Tadian
Kilong	393	393	484	469	540	Sagada
Kin-iway (Poblacion)	750	755	730	670	691	Besao
Lacmaan	263	212	337	316	328	Besao
Lagan	465	432	435	354	353	Sabangan
Lagawa	1,085	1,127	954	934	701	Bauko
Latang	427	435	492	640	520	Barlig
Laylaya	901	828	659	776	680	Besao
Lenga	715	419	701	479	429	Tadian
Leseb	1,348	1,224	1,103	997	695	Bauko
Lias Kanluran	501	488	543	456	337	Barlig
Lias Silangan	464	341	526	480	440	Barlig
Lingoy	240	288	273	336	290	Barlig
Losad	556	686	667	574	580	Sabangan
Lubon	2,073	1,603	1,831	1,725	1,580	Tadian
Lunas	590	658	515	847	803	Barlig
Mabaay	1,489	1,624	1,496	1,084	1,014	Bauko
Mabalite	491	390	458	345	376	Tadian
Macalana	310	345	273	542	360	Barlig
Madongo	485	518	478	377	527	Sagada
Maducayan	362	363	342	391	521	Natonin
Mainit	1,067	1,124	1,162	1,099	1,076	Bontoc
Maligcong	842	481	713	952	591	Bontoc
Masla	1,265	1,147	1,348	1,402	1,213	Tadian
Mayag	910	688	821	728	599	Bauko
Monamon Norte	2,097	2,298	1,854	1,521	1,209	Bauko
Monamon Sur	3,574	2,778	3,119	2,171	1,989	Bauko
Mount Data	674	481	464	585	492	Bauko
Nacagang	254	289	254	252	264	Sagada
Namatec	645	641	656	696	579	Sabangan
Napua	554	585	527	429	436	Sabangan
Ogoog	539	683	783	643	542	Barlig
Otucan Norte	508	449	592	614	370	Bauko
Otucan Sur	994	1,171	1,094	1,016	920	Bauko
Padangan	499	454	846	804	522	Besao
Palitod	2,541	2,377	1,936	1,544	1,379	Paracelis
Pandayan	948	658	821	730	667	Tadian
Payeo	540	507	998	948	880	Besao
Pide	362	413	382	427	419	Sagada
Pingad	306	266	340	390	335	Sabangan
Poblacion	1,492	1,316	1,187	940	1,084	Natonin
Poblacion	5,687	5,319	3,918	3,199	2,427	Paracelis
Poblacion	1,053	1,250	1,112	1,079	1,048	Sabangan
Poblacion	1,547	1,773	1,381	1,321	984	Sadanga
Poblacion	3,194	2,610	2,595	2,456	2,112	Tadian
Poblacion (Bauko)	1,630	1,961	1,689	1,625	1,385	Bauko
Poblacion (Bontoc)	3,030	3,289	3,064	3,143	2,989	Bontoc
Poblacion (Patay)	1,537	1,547	1,347	1,336	1,208	Sagada
Pudo	678	740	775	983	–	Natonin
Sacasacan	747	728	671	637	655	Sadanga
Saclit	1,018	1,023	974	829	1,021	Sadanga
Sadsadan	3,036	2,850	2,631	1,966	1,839	Bauko
Saliok	687	800	675	570	684	Natonin
Samoki	2,881	2,980	2,042	1,843	1,391	Bontoc
Santa Isabel	631	614	609	743	550	Natonin
Sinto	1,042	905	952	758	819	Bauko
Sumadel	752	733	667	680	538	Tadian
Supang	498	467	534	520	480	Sabangan
Suquib	325	280	417	382	306	Besao
Suyo	395	400	450	418	493	Sagada
Taccong	315	324	384	337	333	Sagada
Talubin	1,594	1,722	1,682	1,481	1,168	Bontoc
Tambingan	517	596	481	423	405	Sabangan
Tamboan	803	940	871	742	692	Besao
Tanulong	402	455	423	350	465	Sagada
Tapapan	2,272	2,359	1,961	1,659	1,252	Bauko
Tetepan Norte	397	409	502	602	600	Sagada
Tetepan Sur	408	408	449	429	416	Sagada
Tocucan	1,291	1,407	1,199	1,047	917	Bontoc
Tonglayan	1,104	1,164	1,084	977	1,153	Natonin
Tue	881	666	778	727	625	Tadian
Barangay	2010	2007	2000	1995	1990	Municipality
*Italicized names are former names.; *Dashes (–) in cells indicate unavailable census data.

[top]
