= Mountain Province State University =

Public university in Mountain Province, Philippines

- Former name: Mountain Province Community College
- Type: State university
- Established: 1969
- President: Dr. Edgar G. Cue
- Location: Bontoc, Mountain Province, Philippines; 17°05′30″N 120°58′40″E
- Campus: Main campus (Bontoc); Satellite campuses (Tadian and Paracelis)
- Website: mpsu.edu.ph
- Location in Luzon Location in the Philippines

Mountain Province State University is the only public university in Mountain Province. It is mandated to provide higher professional, technical and special instructions for special purposes and promote research and extension services, advanced studies and progressive leadership in agriculture, education, forestry, engineering, arts, sciences, humanities, and other fields. Its main campus is in Bontoc, Mountain Province.

== History ==
Having been established as the Mountain Province Community College, it was converted into the Mountain Province State Polytechnic College by President Corazon Aquino on January 17, 1992, following the passage of Republic Act No. 7182.

On August 1, 2024, President Bongbong Marcos signed into law Republic Act No. 12016, converting the college into the Mountain Province State University.

== Campuses ==
- Bontoc
- Tadian
- Bauko
- Paracelis
