= Barlig =

Municipality in Mountain Province, Philippines

Barlig Fialikia / Likaw-an
- Municipality
- Municipality of Barlig
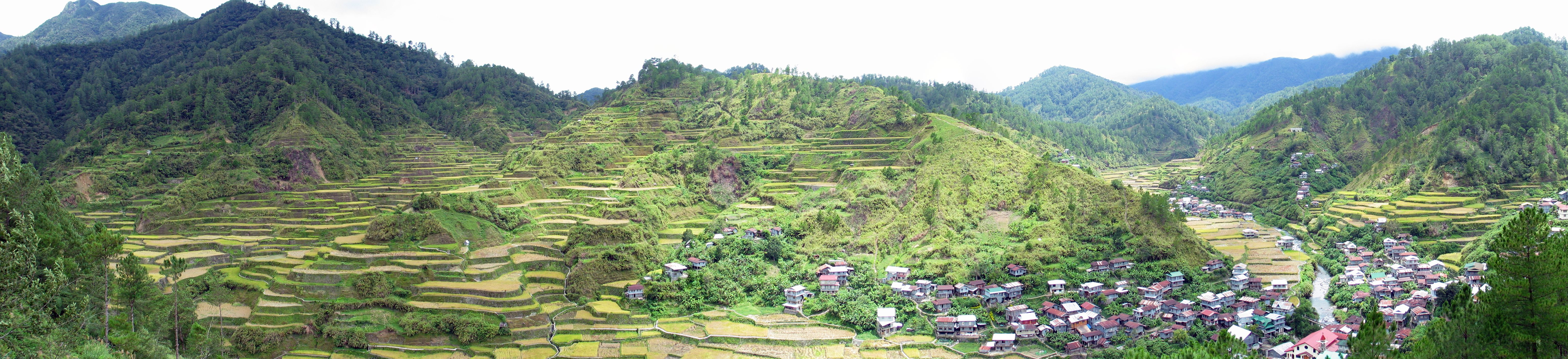
- Barlig and surrounding rice terraces

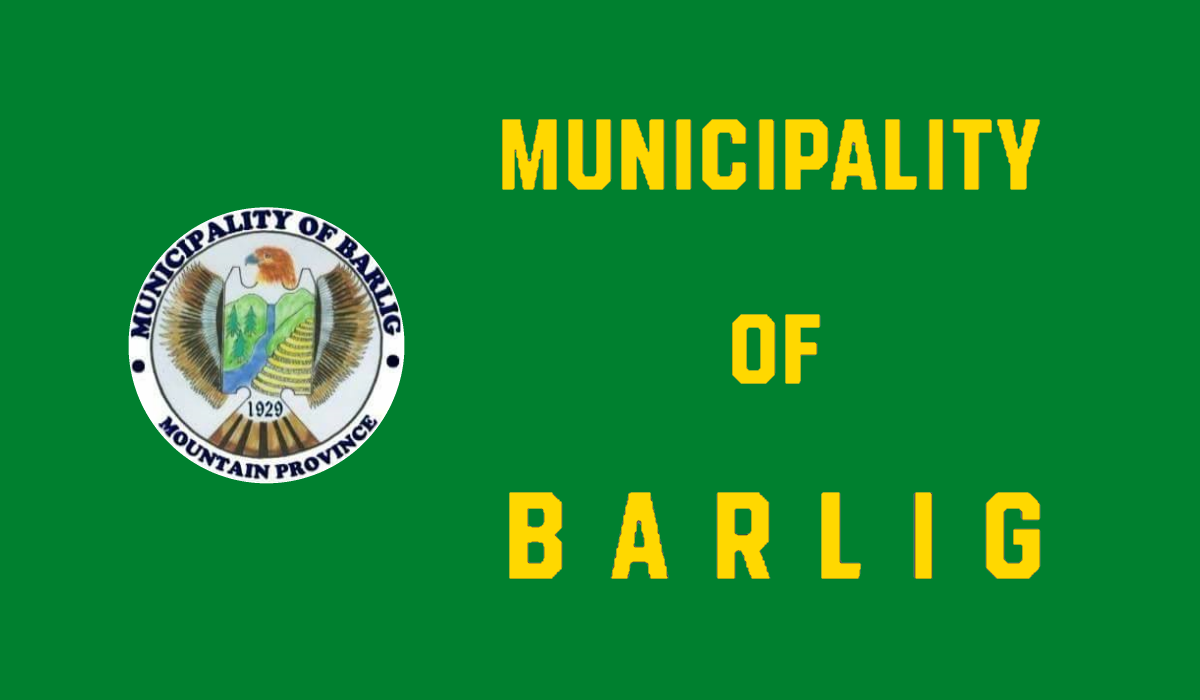
- Flag Seal

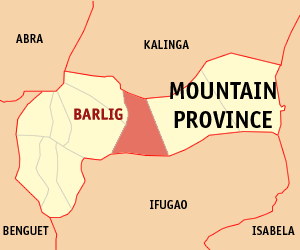
- Map of Mountain Province with Barlig highlighted
- Interactive map of Barlig
- Location within the Philippines
- Coordinates: 17°02′29″N 121°05′58″E
- Country: Philippines
- Region: Cordillera Administrative Region
- Province: Mountain Province
- District: Lone district
- Barangays: 11 (see Barangays)

Government
  - Type: Sangguniang Bayan
  - Mayor: Clark C. Ngaya
  - Vice Mayor: Delio F. Focad
  - Representative: Maximo Y. Dalog Jr.
  - Municipal Council: Members: Benjamin G. Sapguian; Rolly S. Agyao; Rodrigo S. Awe; Boas A. Polec-eo; Consuelo G. Mad-eo; Conard M. Awingan; Edmundo C. Sidchayao; Artimas F. Kumanab
  - Electorate: 4,352 voters (2025)

Area
  - Total: 228.64 km^{2} (88.28 sq mi)
- Elevation: 1,837 m (6,027 ft)
- Highest elevation: 2,689 m (8,822 ft)
- Lowest elevation: 1,252 m (4,108 ft)

Population (2024 census)
  - Total: 4,363
  - Density: 19.08/km^{2} (49.42/sq mi)
  - Households: 1,279

Economy
  - Income class: 4th municipal income class
  - Poverty incidence: 14.68% (2023)
  - Revenue: ₱ 120.1 million (2024)
  - Assets: ₱ 299.8 million (2024)
  - Expenditure: ₱ 109 million (2024)
  - Liabilities: ₱ 25.89 million (2024)

Service provider
  - Electricity: Mountain Province Electric Cooperative (MOPRECO)
- Time zone: UTC+8 (PST)
- ZIP code: 2623
- PSGC: 1404401000
- IDD : area code: +63 (0)74
- Native languages: Finallig; Ilocano; Tagalog

Barlig, officially the Municipality of Barlig (Filipino: Bayan ng Barlig, Ilocano: Ili ti Barlig) is a municipality in the province of Mountain Province, Philippines. According to the 2024 census, it has a population of 4,363 people.

== Geography ==
The Municipality of Barlig is bounded in the east by Natonin in the west by Bontoc and Sadanga. In the north, it is bounded by Tinglayan and in the south by the town of Mayoyao. The town is separated into three settlements or cluster of villages such as Barlig town proper, Lias and Kadaclan.

Barlig is situated 31.80 kilometres (19.76 mi) from the provincial capital Bontoc, and 430.57 kilometres (267.54 mi) from the country's capital city of Manila.

=== Barangays ===
Barlig is politically subdivided into 11 barangays. Each barangay consists of puroks and some have sitios.

- Chupac
- Fiangtin
- Gawana
- Kaleo
- Latang
- Lias Kanluran
- Lias Silangan
- Lingoy
- Lunas
- Macalana
- Ogoog

=== Climate ===
Climate data for Barlig, Mountain Province
Month	Jan	Feb	Mar	Apr	May	Jun	Jul	Aug	Sep	Oct	Nov	Dec	Year
Mean daily maximum °C (°F)	19 (66)	20 (68)	21 (70)	23 (73)	23 (73)	22 (72)	21 (70)	21 (70)	21 (70)	21 (70)	20 (68)	19 (66)	21 (70)
Mean daily minimum °C (°F)	12 (54)	12 (54)	13 (55)	15 (59)	16 (61)	17 (63)	17 (63)	17 (63)	16 (61)	15 (59)	14 (57)	13 (55)	15 (59)
Average precipitation mm (inches)	35 (1.4)	46 (1.8)	63 (2.5)	117 (4.6)	402 (15.8)	400 (15.7)	441 (17.4)	471 (18.5)	440 (17.3)	258 (10.2)	94 (3.7)	68 (2.7)	2,835 (111.6)
Average rainy days	9.9	19.5	13.9	18.9	26.0	27.3	28.9	28.5	26.1	19.7	14.5	12.8	246
Source: Meteoblue (modeled/calculated data, not measured locally)

Barlig has an oceanic climate (Köppen climate classification Cfb) closely bordering a subtropical highland climate ("Cwb") with relatively dry winters.

== Demographics ==
Population census of Barlig

Year	Pop.	±% p.a.
1939	1,827	—
1948	1,952	+0.74%
1960	2,972	+3.56%
1970	4,053	+3.15%
1975	5,138	+4.87%

Year	Pop.	±% p.a.
1980	5,241	+0.40%
1990	6,273	+1.81%
1995	7,477	+3.34%
2000	6,351	−3.44%
2007	6,168	−0.40%

Year	Pop.	±% p.a.
2010	5,838	−1.98%
2015	4,819	−3.59%
2020	4,796	−0.10%
2024	4,363	−2.25%

Source: Philippine Statistics Authority

In the 2024 census, the population of Barlig was 4,363 people, with a density of 19 inhabitants per square kilometer or 49 inhabitants per square mile.

The people of Barlig are predominantly of Igorot and Ilocano descent. Locals call themselves Ifiallig which is a reference to someone born or having roots from villages. In the cluster of villages in Lias, people call themselves I-lias while those from Kadaclan villages call themselves Ekachakran. Despite living in a single town, the people speak different languages and probably traditions.

=== Languages ===
Bontoc (Eastern Bontoc) is the main language of Barlig with the Ilocano as a lingua franca in the municipality.

Barlig is home to the Finalig language or Eastern Bontoc. The Finallig language has 3 dialects: iFialikia, iLias, and eKachakran. The Finallig language is spoken by the natives in Barlig.

== Economy ==
Poverty incidence of Barlig

Source: Philippine Statistics Authority

The key economic sectors of Barlig are agriculture and handicrafts. Rice cultivation is the primary crop of Barlig, supported by root crops and small-scale vegetable and fruit production. Barlig is famous for rattan weaving like the native backpack known as pasiking.

== Government ==
=== Local government ===
Barlig, belonging to the lone congressional district of the province of Mountain Province, is governed by a mayor designated as its local chief executive and by a municipal council as its legislative body in accordance with the Local Government Code. The mayor, vice mayor, and the councilors are elected directly by the people through an election which is being held every three years.

=== Elected officials ===
Members of the Municipal Council (2025–2028)
Position	Name
Congressman	Maximo Y. Dalog Jr.
Mayor	Clark C. Ngaya
Vice-Mayor	Delio F. Focad
Councilors	Rodrigo S. Awe
Councilors	Edmundo C. Sidchayao
Councilors	Benjamin G. Sapguian
Councilors	Artimas F. Kumanab
Councilors	Boas A. Polec-eo
Councilors	Conard M. Awingan
Councilors	Michael C. Pinos-an
Councilors	Romeo F. Amawan

== Tourism ==
Barlig town boasts of its own rice terraces, the Barlig Rice Terraces in the near the center of the town and Lias Rice Terraces in the Lias, which is a cluster of villages. In Kadaclan, which is another cluster of villages, the annual Menaliyam festival is held. Its most popular destination is Mount Amuyao which stands at more than 2,702 meters above sea level. That makes it one of the highest mountains in the Philippines and the fourth highest mountain in Luzon. The mountain includes a campsite and TV transmission facilities of GMA and ALLTV (formerly ABS-CBN).

== Education ==
The Barlig Schools District Office governs all educational institutions within the municipality. It oversees the management and operations of all private and public, from primary to secondary schools.

=== Primary and elementary schools ===
- Barlig Central School
- Kadaclan Elementary School
- Kaleo Elementary School
- Latang Elementary School
- Lias Elementary School
- Lingoy Primary School
- Lingoy-Chatol Elementary School
- Lunas Primary School
- Mog-ao Primary School
- Ogo-og Elementary School

=== Secondary schools ===
- Barlig National High School
- Eastern Bontoc National Agricultural Vocational High School
- Kadaclan National High School
- Lias National High School

=== Higher educational institution ===
- Mountain Province State Polytechnic College (under construction)

== Notable personalities ==
- Jeyrick Sigmaton - actor and model
