= Bauko =

Municipality in Mountain Province, Philippines

- Municipality
- Municipality of Bauko
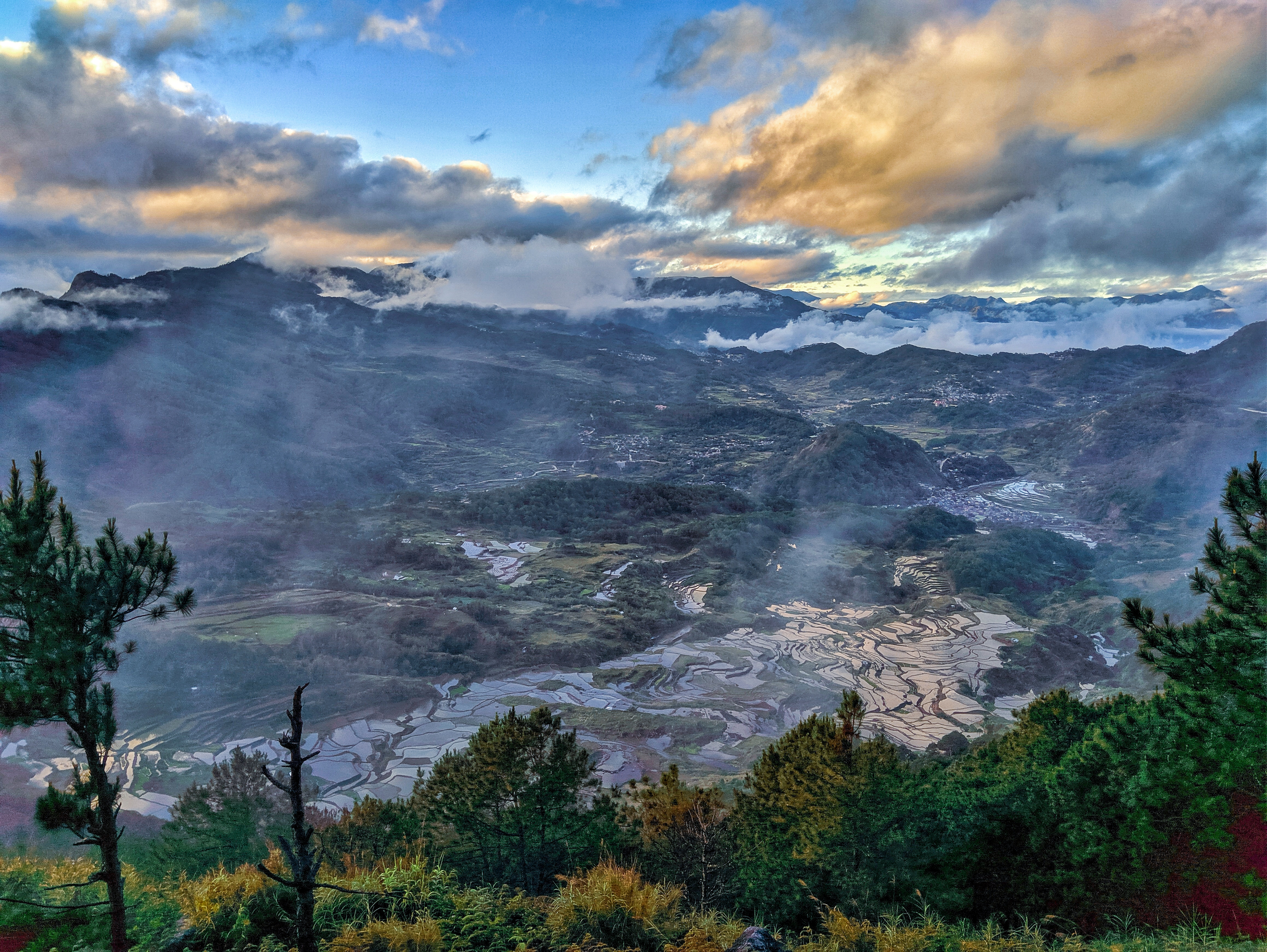
- Bauko seen from Benguet

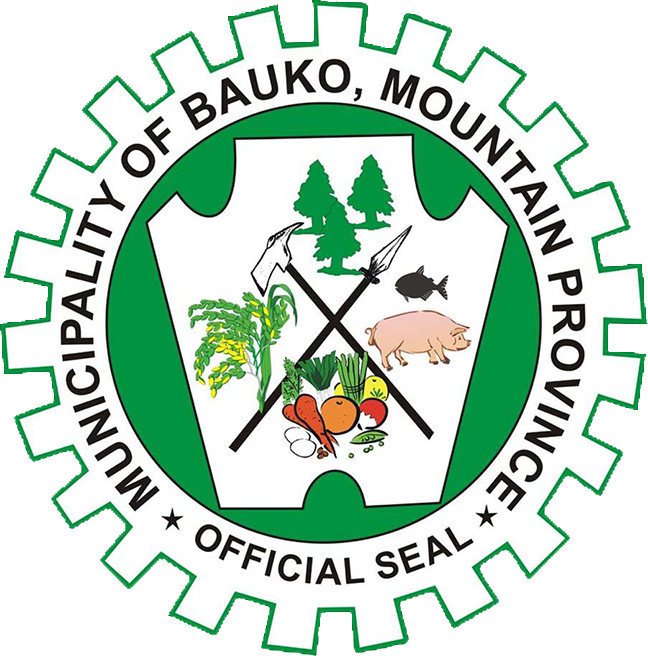
- Seal

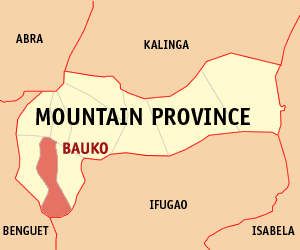
- Map of Mountain Province with Bauko highlighted
- Interactive map of Bauko
- Location within the Philippines
- Coordinates: 16°59′30″N 120°51′52″E
- Country: Philippines
- Region: Cordillera Administrative Region
- Province: Mountain Province
- District: Lone district
- Barangays: 22 (see Barangays)

Government
  - Type: Sangguniang Bayan
  - Mayor: Randolf T. Awisan
  - Vice Mayor: Bartolome B. Badecao
  - Representative: Maximo Y. Dalog Jr.
  - Municipal Council: Members: Ashley T. Sili; Gil B. Lumpisa; Tomas B. Tanggacan; Edna B. Capuyan; Eduardo A. Patnay; Mario I. Gaoken; Jackson C. Codod; Arcadio B. Taganas
  - Electorate: 26,811 voters (2025)

Area
  - Total: 153.00 km^{2} (59.07 sq mi)
- Elevation: 1,359 m (4,459 ft)
- Highest elevation: 1,915 m (6,283 ft)
- Lowest elevation: 751 m (2,464 ft)

Population (2024 census)
  - Total: 31,470
  - Density: 205.7/km^{2} (532.7/sq mi)
  - Households: 7,360

Economy
  - Income class: 2nd municipal income class
  - Poverty incidence: 17.39% (2023)
  - Revenue: ₱ 176.2 million (2024)
  - Assets: ₱ 274 million (2024)
  - Expenditure: ₱ 176.2 million (2024)
  - Liabilities: ₱ 176.1 million (2024)

Service provider
  - Electricity: Mountain Province Electric Cooperative (MOPRECO)
- Time zone: UTC+8 (PST)
- ZIP code: 2621
- PSGC: 1404402000
- IDD : area code: +63 (0)74
- Native languages: Kankanaey; Balangao; Bontoc; Ilocano; Tagalog
- Website: lgubauko.gov.ph

Bauko, officially the Municipality of Bauko (Kankanaey: Ili di Bauko; Balangao: Babley hen Bauko; Bontok: Ili nan Bauko; Ilocano: Ili ti Bauko; Tagalog: Bayan ng Bauko; Spanish: Municipio de Baúco) is a municipality in the province of Mountain Province, Philippines. According to the 2024 census, it has a population of 31,470 people making it the most populous in the province.

== History ==
=== Chico River Dam Project ===
Bauko was one of several municipalities in Mountain Province which would have been flooded by the Chico River Dam Project during the Marcos dictatorship, alongside Bontoc, Sabangan, Sadanga, Sagada, and parts of Barlig. However, the indigenous peoples of Kalinga Province and Mountain Province resisted the project and when hostilities resulted in the murder of Macli-ing Dulag, the project became unpopular and was abandoned before Marcos was ousted by the 1986 People Power Revolution.

== Geography ==
The Municipality of Bauko is the largest town in Mountain Province.

Bauko is situated 27.72 kilometres (17.22 mi) from the provincial capital Bontoc, and 364.48 kilometres (226.48 mi) from the country's capital city of Manila.

=== Barangays ===
Bauko is politically subdivided into 22 barangays, divided into the upper and lower areas. Each barangay consists of puroks and some have sitios.

- Abatan
- Bagnen Oriente
- Bagnen Proper
- Balintaugan
- Banao
- Bila
- Guinzadan Central
- Guinzadan Norte
- Guinzadan Sur
- Lagawa
- Leseb
- Mabaay
- Mayag
- Monamon Norte
- Monamon Sur
- Mount Data
- Otucan Norte
- Otucan Sur
- Poblacion (Bauko)
- Sadsadan
- Sinto
- Tapapan

=== Climate ===
Climate data for Bauko, Mountain Province
| Month | Jan | Feb | Mar | Apr | May | Jun | Jul | Aug | Sep | Oct | Nov | Dec | Year |
|---|---|---|---|---|---|---|---|---|---|---|---|---|---|
| Mean daily maximum °C (°F) | 20 (68) | 21 (70) | 23 (73) | 24 (75) | 24 (75) | 23 (73) | 23 (73) | 22 (72) | 23 (73) | 23 (73) | 22 (72) | 20 (68) | 22 (72) |
| Mean daily minimum °C (°F) | 13 (55) | 14 (57) | 15 (59) | 16 (61) | 18 (64) | 18 (64) | 18 (64) | 18 (64) | 17 (63) | 16 (61) | 15 (59) | 14 (57) | 16 (61) |
| Average precipitation mm (inches) | 35 (1.4) | 46 (1.8) | 63 (2.5) | 117 (4.6) | 402 (15.8) | 400 (15.7) | 441 (17.4) | 471 (18.5) | 440 (17.3) | 258 (10.2) | 94 (3.7) | 68 (2.7) | 2,835 (111.6) |
| Average rainy days | 9.9 | 19.5 | 13.9 | 18.9 | 26.0 | 27.3 | 28.9 | 28.5 | 26.1 | 19.7 | 14.5 | 12.8 | 246 |
Source: Meteoblue (modeled/calculated data, not measured locally)

== Demographics ==
Population census of Bauko

| Year | Pop. | ±% p.a. |
|---|---|---|
| 1903 | 82 | — |
| 1918 | 7,994 | +35.71% |
| 1939 | 8,322 | +0.19% |
| 1948 | 8,347 | +0.03% |
| 1960 | 12,229 | +3.23% |
| 1970 | 14,104 | +1.43% |

| Year | Pop. | ±% p.a. |
|---|---|---|
| 1975 | 14,808 | +0.98% |
| 1980 | 16,688 | +2.42% |
| 1990 | 21,126 | +2.39% |
| 1995 | 24,242 | +2.61% |
| 2000 | 27,729 | +2.92% |
| 2007 | 29,382 | +0.80% |

| Year | Pop. | ±% p.a. |
|---|---|---|
| 2010 | 30,172 | +0.97% |
| 2015 | 31,065 | +0.56% |
| 2020 | 32,021 | +0.64% |
| 2024 | 31,470 | −0.42% |

Source: Philippine Statistics Authority

In the 2024 census, the population of Bauko was 31,470 people, with a density of 210 inhabitants per square kilometer or 540 inhabitants per square mile.

== Economy ==
Poverty incidence of Bauko

Source: Philippine Statistics Authority

The main economic source of Bauko is agriculture. Bauko's farmers produce highland temperate vegetables such as potatoes and tomatoes.

== Government ==
=== Local government ===
Bauko, belonging to the lone congressional district of the province of Mountain Province, is governed by a mayor designated as its local chief executive and by a municipal council as its legislative body in accordance with the Local Government Code. The mayor, vice mayor, and the councilors are elected directly by the people through an election which is being held every three years.

=== Elected officials ===
Members of the Municipal Council (2025–2028)
| Position | Name |
|---|---|
| Congressman | Maximo Y. Dalog Jr. |
| Mayor | Randolf T. Awisan |
| Vice-Mayor | Ashley T. Sili |
| Councilors | Archie A. Pakipac |
| Councilors | Gil B. Lumpisa |
| Councilors | Primo B. Aligo |
| Councilors | Clefton B. Badecao |
| Councilors | Jackson C. Codod |
| Councilors | Rodolfo A. Patnaan |
| Councilors | Tomas B. Tanggacan |
| Councilors | Alverenio B. Angupa |

== Education ==
There are two schools district offices which govern all educational institutions within the municipality. They oversee the management and operations of all private and public, from primary to secondary schools. These are Bauko I Schools District Office, and Bauko II Schools District Office.

=== Primary and elementary schools ===
- Abatan Elementary School
- Ambacbac Elementary School
- Asbiagan Primary School
- Bagnen Oriente Elementary School
- Bagnen Elementary School
- Banao Elementary School
- Bansa Elementary School
- Bauko Central School
- Bebe Elementary School
- Bila Elementary School
- Binaka Elementary School
- Bright Prodigy Academy of Bauko
- Caotit Primary School
- Coputan Primary School
- Cotcot Primary School
- Gotang Primary School
- Guinzadan Elementary School
- Guinzadan Norte Elementary School
- Lagawa Elementary School
- Lebao Primary School
- Leseb Elementary School
- Letang Elementary School
- Mabaay Elementary School
- Mayag Elementary School
- Monamon Elementary School
- Monamon Proper Elementary School
- Mount Data Elementary School
- Nanggawa Primary School
- Otucan Elementary School
- Otucan Norte Elementary School
- Pactil Elementary School
- Pangao Elementary School
- Pitpitan Elementary School
- Sadsadan Bato Elementary School
- Sadsadan Trail Elementary School
- Salin Elementary School
- Sengyew Primary School
- Shalimar Crown Academy
- Sinto Elementary School
- Soysoyoc Primary School
- Tamog-o Elementary School
- Tapapan Elementary School

=== Secondary schools ===
- Abatan National High School
- Bagnen National High School
- Banao National High School
- Bansa National High School
- Bauko Catholic School
- Guinzadan National High School
- Guinzadan National High School - Mayag Extension
- Leseb National High School
- Mabaay National High School
- Mt. Data National High School
- Otucan-Bila National High School
- Tapapan National High School
- Tipunan National High School

=== Higher educational institution ===
- Mountain Province State Polytechnic College

== Notable personalities ==
- Maximo Dalog, Mt. Province Representative/congressman, lawmaker, governor, board member
- Marky Cielo, actor
