= Jeyrick Sigmaton =

Filipino actor and model

- Born: February 15, 1994 (age 31); Barlig, Mountain Province, Philippines
- Other names: Carrot Man
- Occupations: Actor; model; endorser
- Years active: 2016–present
- Known for: Carrot Man guest in KMJS
- Height: 1.76 m (5 ft 9 1/2 in)

Jeyrick Sigmaton (born February 15, 1994), better known as Carrot Man, is a Filipino actor and model. He went viral in 2016 and was discovered by guesting in Kapuso Mo, Jessica Soho.

== Personal life and career ==
Sigmaton is a native Igorot of Ekachakran tribe from Mountain Province and his only livelihood, before he was discovered and went viral through guesting in Kapuso Mo, Jessica Soho, was lifting baskets of carrots to be delivered by trucks; thus he was called 'Carrot Man'. And when he was asked which celebrity he wanted to see, he answered the new host in GMA, Willie Revillame, then he guested on Revillame's show in GMA, Wowowin.

In 2021, Sigmaton won the Best Actor award for the Short Film category at the International Film Festival Manhattan (IFFM) Autumn 2021 in New York.
