= Mountain Province =

Province in Cordillera, Philippines

- Province
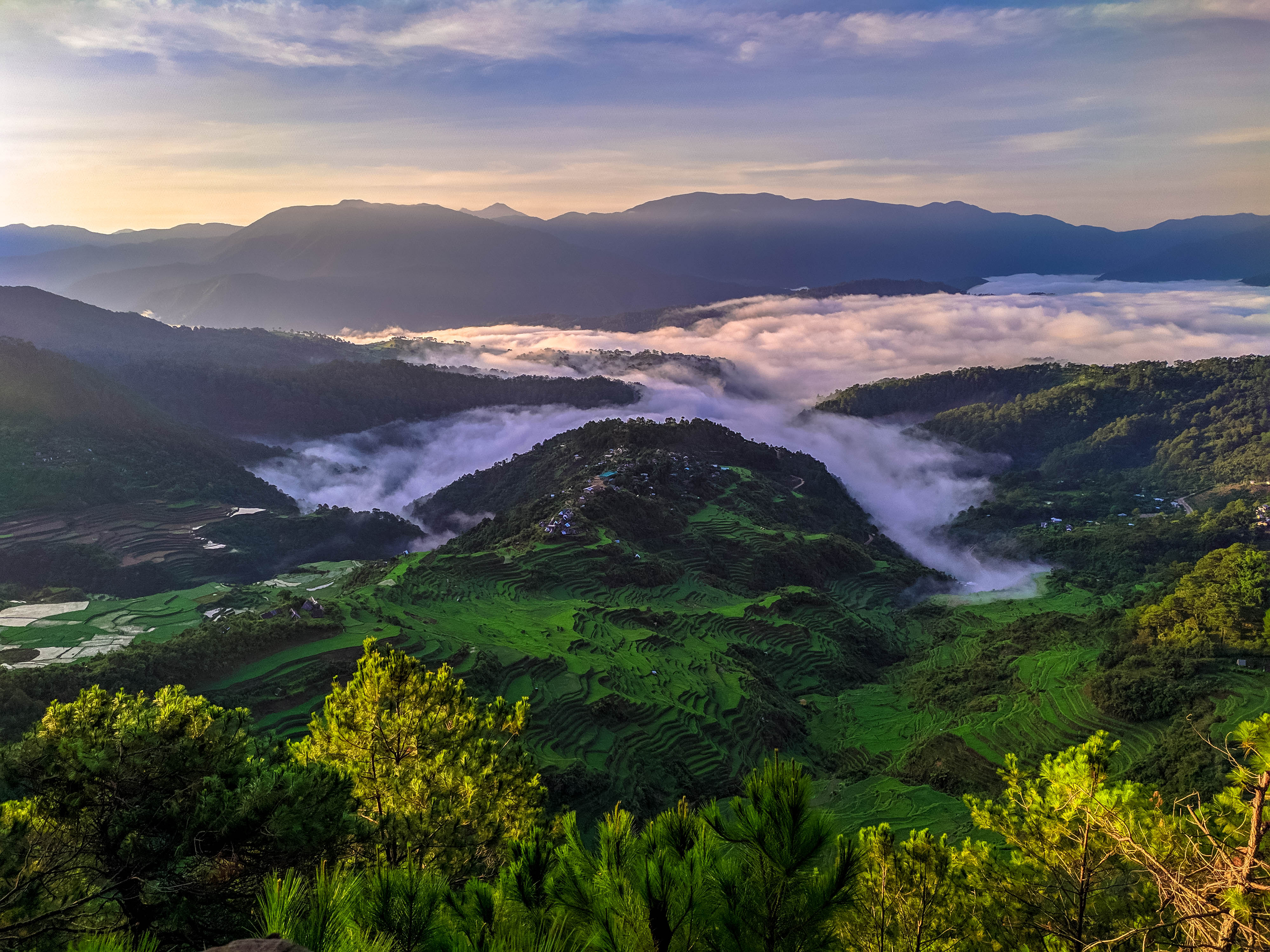
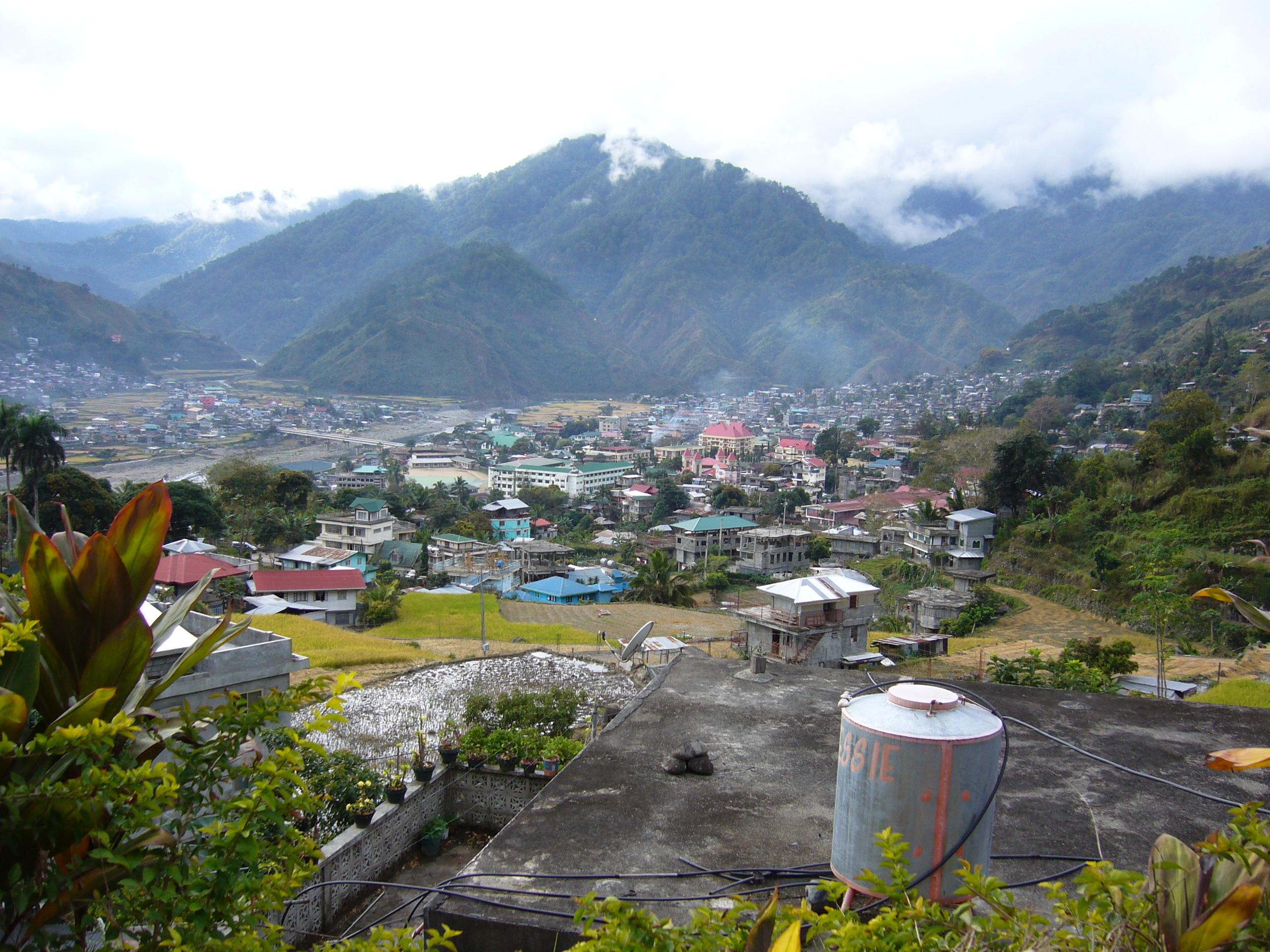
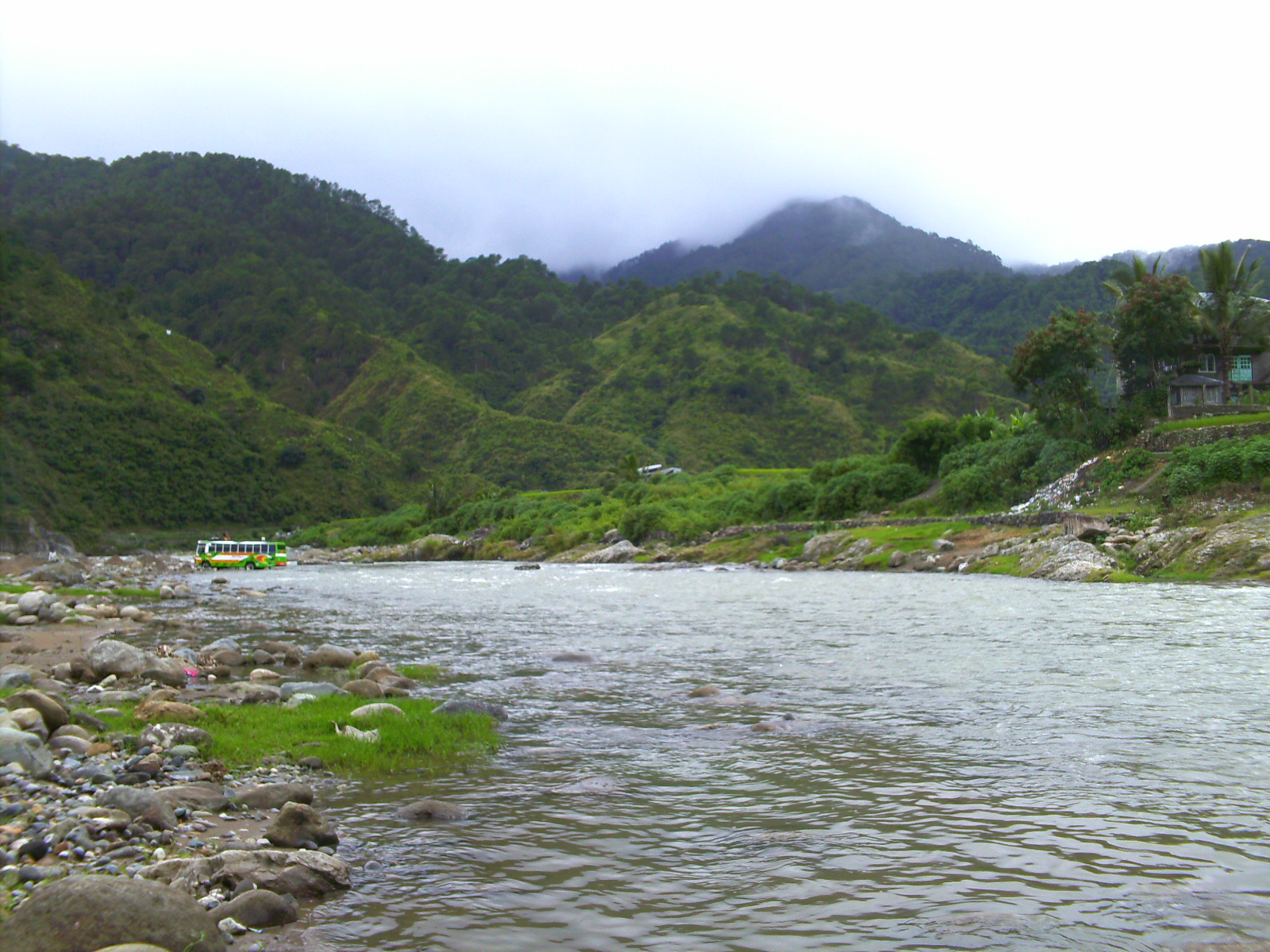
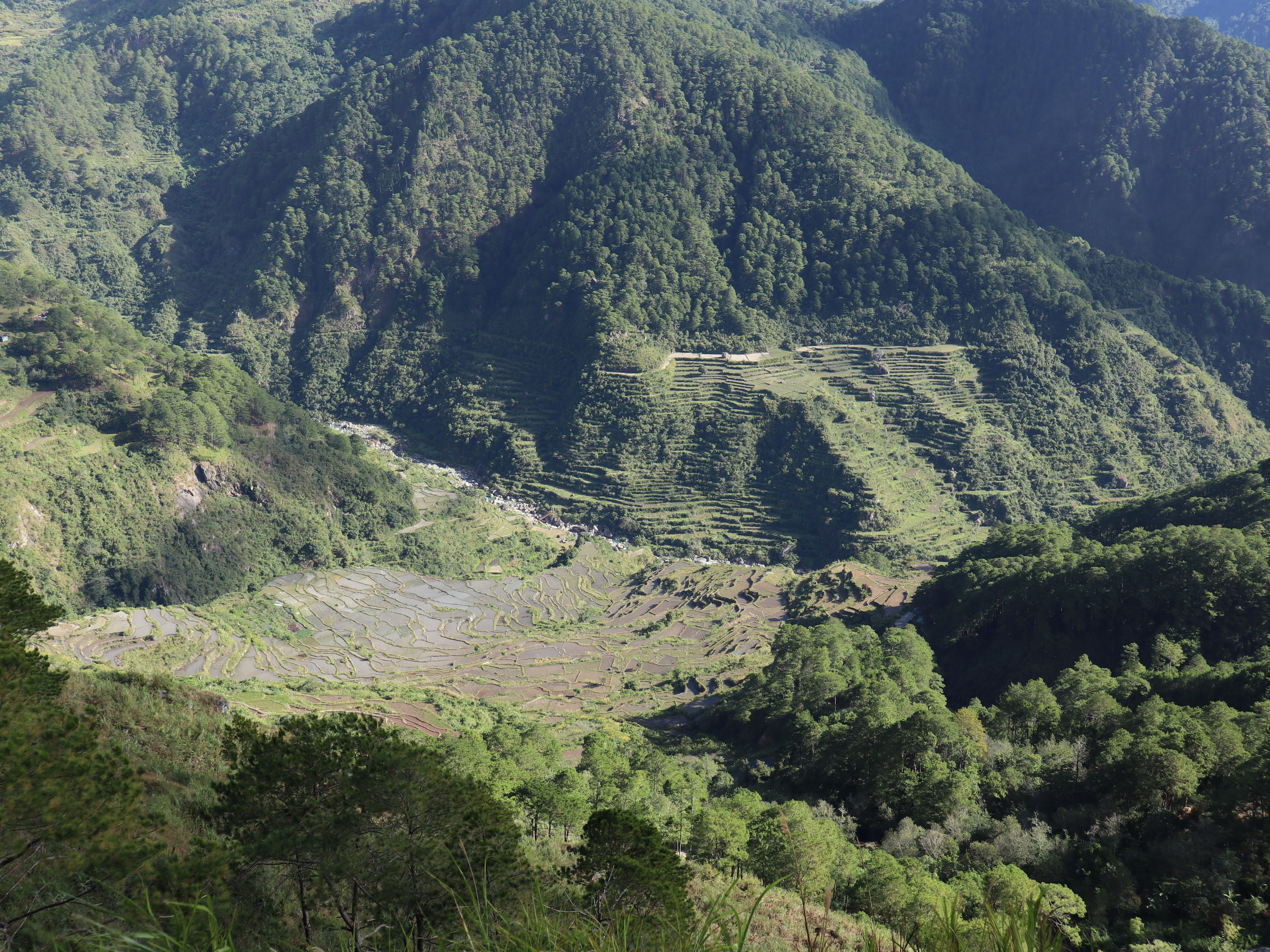
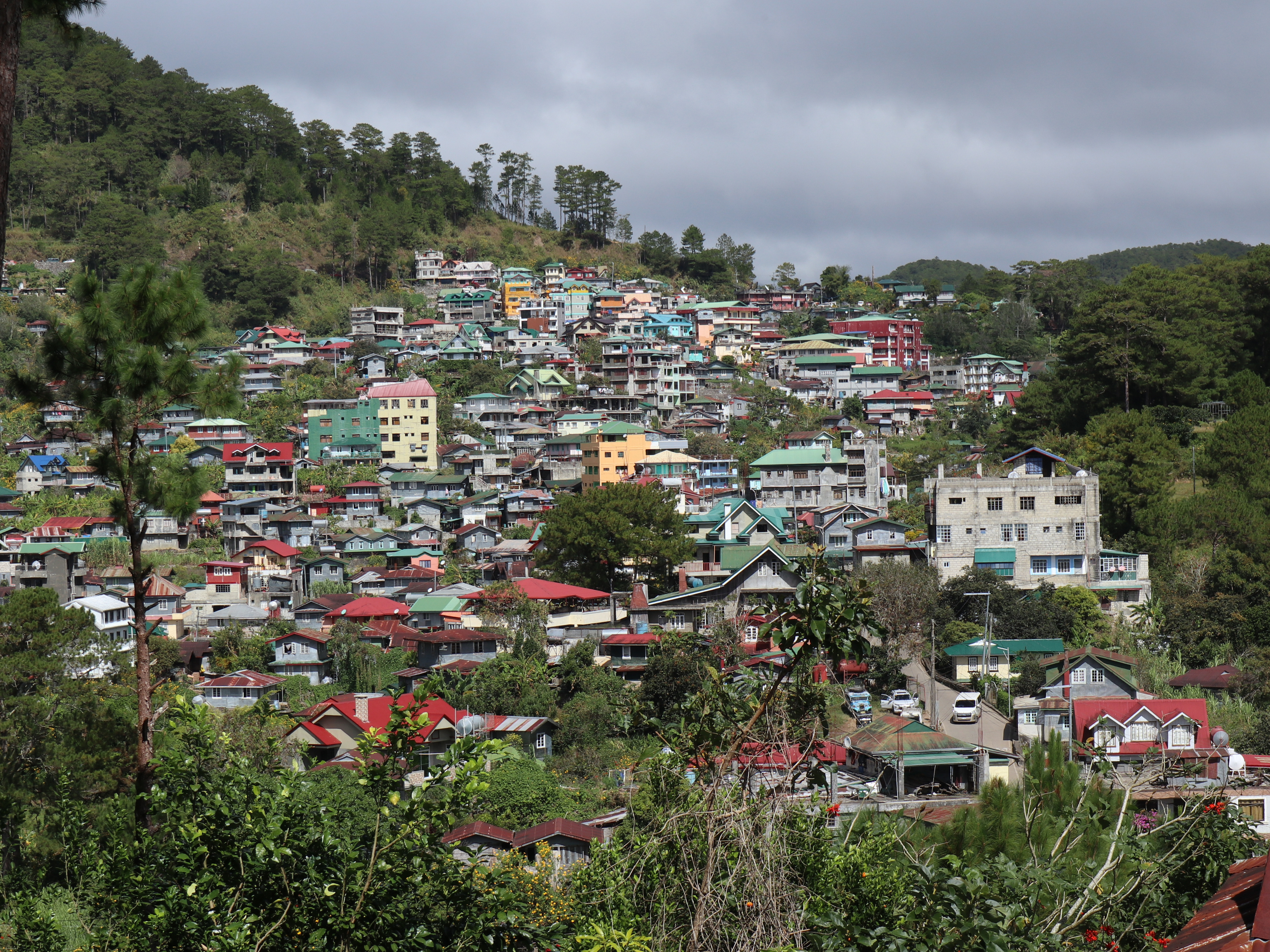
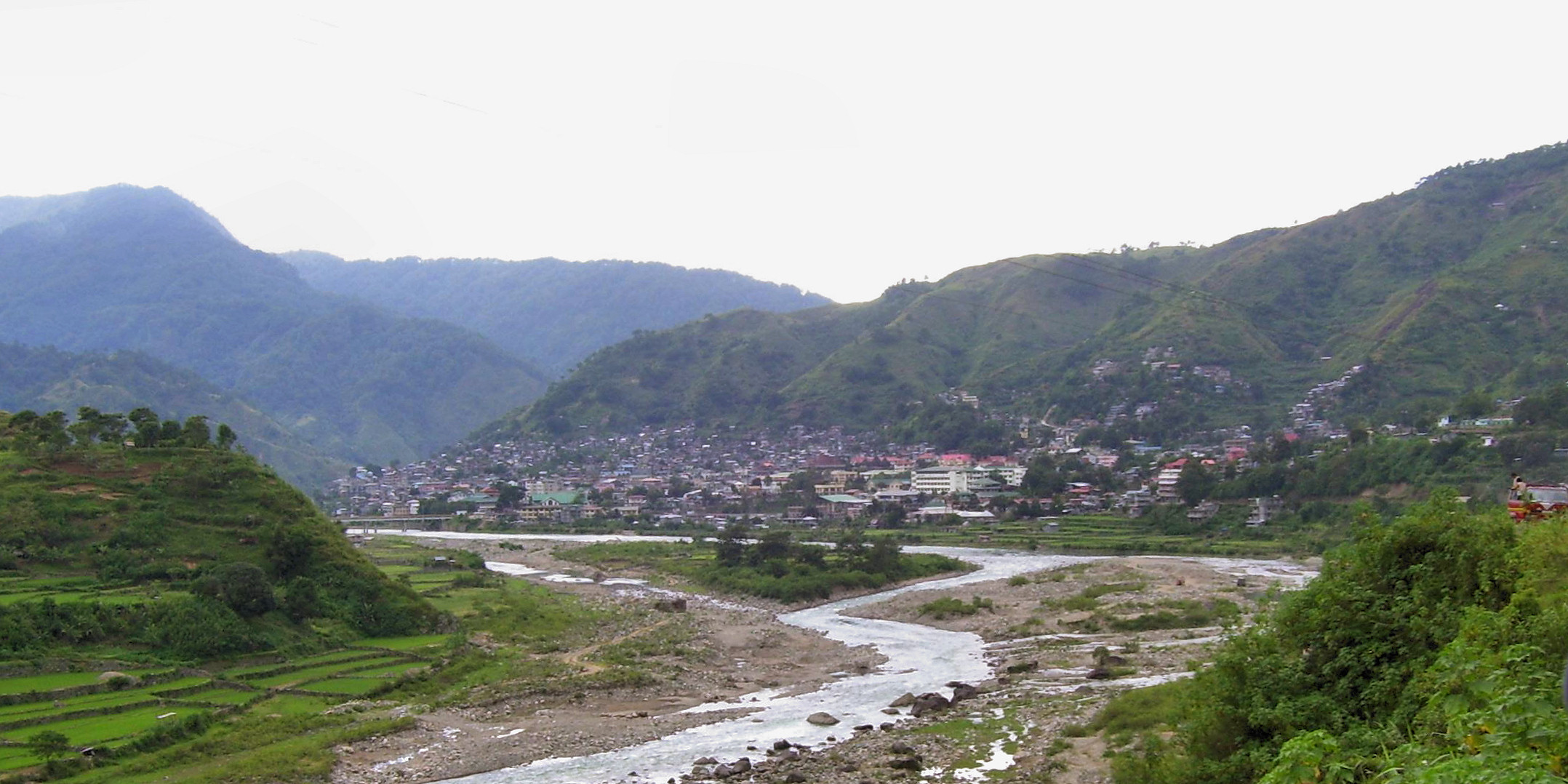
- (from top: left to right) Maligcong Rice Terraces in Bontoc, Bontoc, Chico River, Sagada rice terraces, Sagada and Chico River in Bontoc.

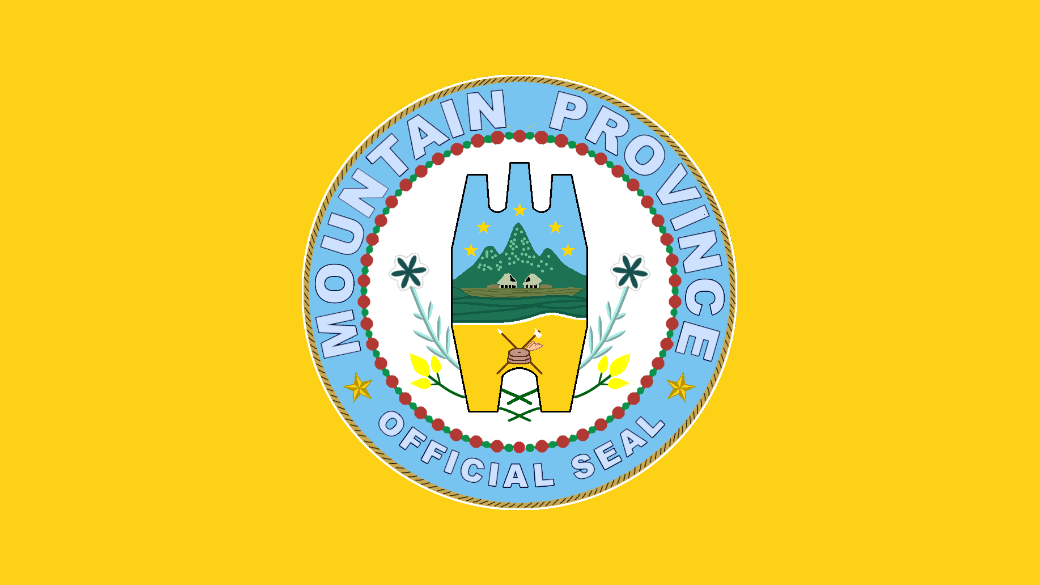
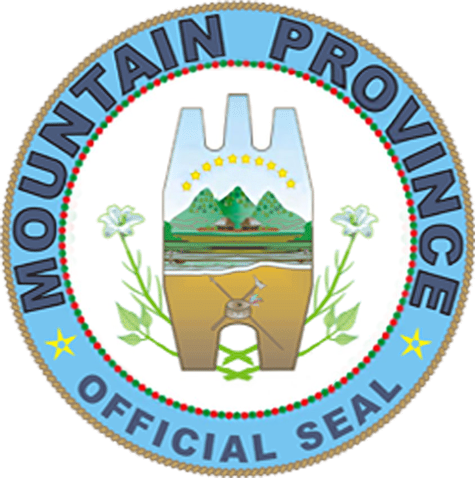
- Flag Seal
- Interactive map of Mountain Province
- Coordinates: 17°05′N 121°10′E
- Country: Philippines
- Region: Cordillera Administrative Region
- Founded: August 18, 1908
- Reorganized: June 18, 1966
- Capital: Bontoc
- Largest Municipality: Bauko

Government
  - Type: Sangguniang Panlalawigan
  - Governor: Bonifacio C. Lacwasan Jr. (PFP)
  - Vice Governor: Jose O. Dominguez (Independent)
  - Representative: Maximo Y. Dalug Jr. (NP)
  - Legislature: Mountain Province Provincial Board
  - Electorate: 121,647 voters (2025)

Area
  - Total: 2,157.38 km^{2} (832.97 sq mi)
  - Rank: 58th out of 82
- Highest elevation (Mount Amuyao): 2,702 m (8,865 ft)

Population (2024 census)
  - Total: 149,775
  - Rank: 76th out of 82
  - Density: 69.4245/km^{2} (179.809/sq mi)
  - Rank: 75th out of 82
  - Households: 37,601
- Demonym: i-Mountain Province

Divisions
  - Independent cities: 0
  - Component cities: 0
  - Municipalities: 10: Barlig; Bauko; Besao; Bontoc; Natonin; Paracelis; Sabangan; Sadanga; Sagada; Tadian
  - Barangays: 144
  - Districts: Legislative district of Mountain Province

Economy
  - Income class: 2nd provincial income class
  - Poverty incidence: 10.5% (2023)
  - Revenue: ₱ 1,377 million (2024)
  - Assets: ₱ 8,520 million (2024)
  - Expenditure: ₱ 1,364 million (2024)
  - Liabilities: ₱ 1,066 million (2024)
- Time zone: UTC+8 (PHT)
- PSGC: 144400000
- IDD : area code: +63 (0)74
- ISO 3166 code: PH-MOU
- Spoken languages: Bontoc; Kankanaey; Balangao; Ilocano; Filipino; English
- Website: mountainprovince.gov.ph

Mountain Province (Note: Uncommonly known in Tagalog as Lalawigang Bulubundukin, formerly used in Spanish as La Montañosa, also known as Kaigorotan by many locals, and the aforementioned capital is a metonymy for the province by some people. "About The Province".) is a landlocked province of the Philippines in the Cordillera Administrative Region in Luzon. Its capital is Bontoc while Bauko is the largest municipality. Mountain Province was formerly referred to as Mountain in some foreign references. The name is usually shortened by locals to Mt. Province.

The province was named so for being in the Cordillera Central mountain range found in the upper realms of Luzon island.

Mountain Province was also the name of the historical province that included most of the current Cordillera provinces. This old province was established by the Philippine Commission in 1908, and was later split in 1966 into Mountain Province, Benguet, Kalinga-Apayao and Ifugao.

The province is also known for its mummy caves, which contain naturally mummified bodies, and for its hanging coffins.

== History ==
=== Spanish colonial era ===
The area of the Cordillera mountains proved difficult to control by the Spaniards. During the long Spanish rule, not much was done to bring the province under control. From 1566 to 1665, they sent expeditions to conquer the land but the rugged terrain and hostile indigenous population at the time were major obstacles to complete subjugation. The first serious effort to subjugate them was made in 1785 when soldiers were sent from Cagayan to put down a revolt of the Kalingas. A famous Spanish explorer, Guillermo Galvez, conducted more than 40 forays to the mountainous region.

Formerly called La Montañosa by the Spanish colonizers due to its mountainous terrain, the area was subdivided into 6 comandancias politico-militar.

The 6 former Comandancias Politico-Militar of La Montañosa
| Comandancia | Year established | Comandancia | Year established |
|---|---|---|---|
| Benguet | 1846 | Amburayan | 1889 |
| Lepanto | 1852 | Kayapa | 1891 |
| Bontoc | 1859 | Cabugaoan | 1891 |

=== American colonial era ===
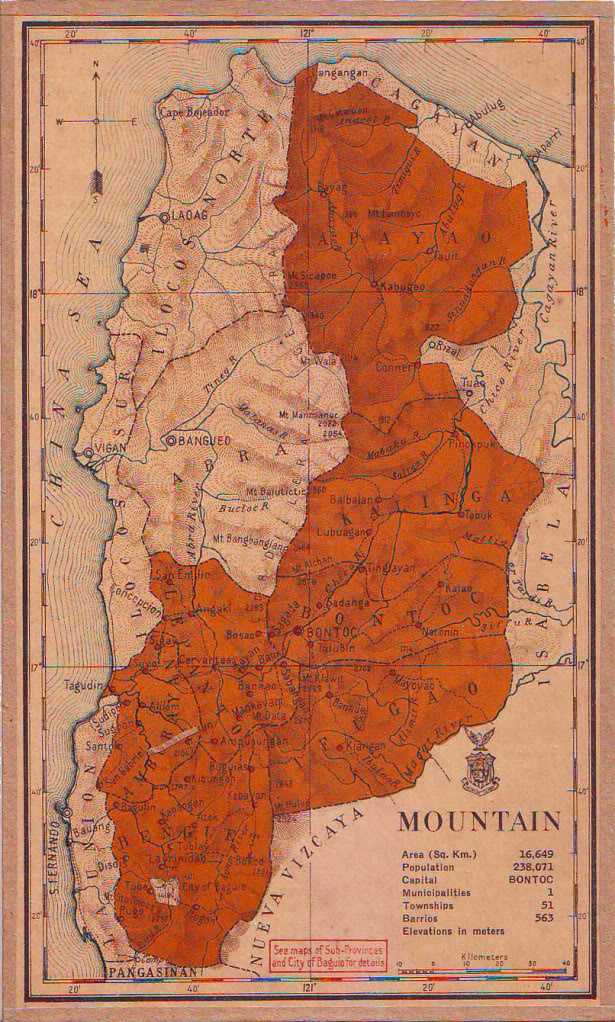
Mountain province in 1918

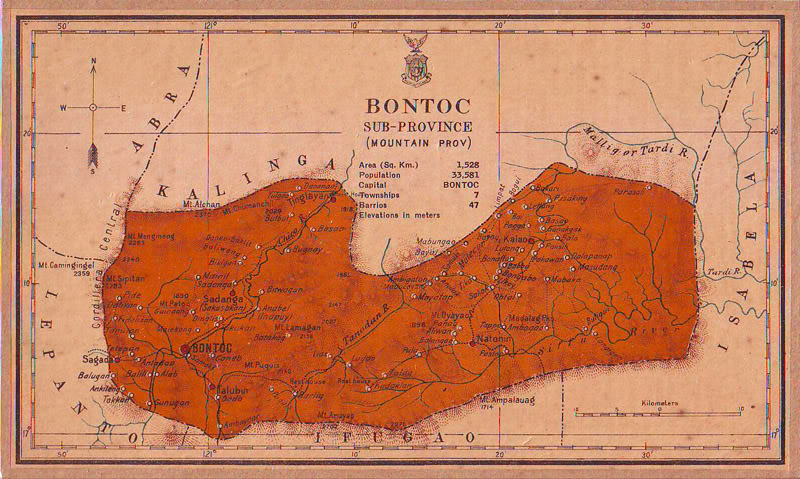
Bontoc sub-province in 1918, which roughly covers the territory of modern day Mountain province

On August 19, 1908, during the American rule, the Philippine Commission enacted Act No. 1876, which organized the entire area of the Cordilleras into one large province, named Mountain Province.

The first governor was Samuel Kane, and the town of Bontoc was made the capital. It was originally composed of the sub-provinces of Amburayan, Apayao, Benguet, Lepanto-Bontoc, Ifugao and Kalinga. Amburayan was later abolished in 1920 and its corresponding territories were transferred to the provinces of Ilocos Sur and La Union. Lepanto was also reduced in size and its towns were integrated into the sub-provinces of Bontoc and Benguet, and to the province of Ilocos Sur.

Historical sub-provinces of Mountain Province under Act No. 1876
| Sub-province | Abolished? | Notes |
|---|---|---|
| Amburayan | Yes, in 1920 | Territories annexed to Ilocos Sur, La Union, and Benguet |
| Apayao | No | |
| Benguet | No | Eastern towns annexed to Ilocos Sur and La Union in 1920 |
| Ifugao | No | |
| Kalinga | No | |
| Lepanto-Bontoc | Yes, in 1920 | Territories annexed to Ilocos Sur, La Union, Bontoc, and Benguet |

=== Philippine independence ===
Effective on April 7, 1967, Republic Act No. 4695 abolished the old Mountain Province, converting its sub-provinces into 4 independent provinces: Benguet, Ifugao, Kalinga-Apayao and Mountain Province (corresponding to the former Bontoc sub-province). Bontoc became the capital of the new Mountain Province.

Mountain Province would have been significantly affected by the Chico River Dam Project during the Marcos administration, as the Marcos regime's project would have flooded the municipalities of Sabangan, Sagada, Sadanga, Bontoc, Bauko, and parts of Barlig. However, the indigenous peoples of Kalinga Province and Mountain Province resisted the project and when hostilities resulted in the murder of Macli-ing Dulag, the project became unpopular and was abandoned before Marcos was ousted by the 1986 People Power Revolution.

On June 15, 1987, the Cordillera Administrative Region was established upon the issuance of Executive Order 220 by then-President Corazon Aquino, and Mountain Province was made one of its provinces.

=== Indigenous People's Day ===
Through Presidential Proclamation 682, October 4, 2024 was declared a special non-working day to commemorate the Provincial Indigenous People’s Day.

== Geography ==
Mountain Province covers a total area of 2,157.38 square kilometers (832.97 sq mi) occupying the central section of the Cordillera Administrative Region in Luzon. The province is bordered on the north by Kalinga, east by Isabela, south by Ifugao, southwest by Benguet, west by Ilocos Sur, and northwest by Abra.

Situated within the Cordillera Central, Mountain Province is 83% mountainous while 17% make up hills and levels. The province has many rivers, waterfalls, mountains, and caves. The central and western areas of the province are characterized by rugged mountains and steep cliffs, while the eastern portion has generally sloping terrain.

=== Administrative divisions ===
Mountain Province comprises ten municipalities, all encompassed by a lone legislative district.

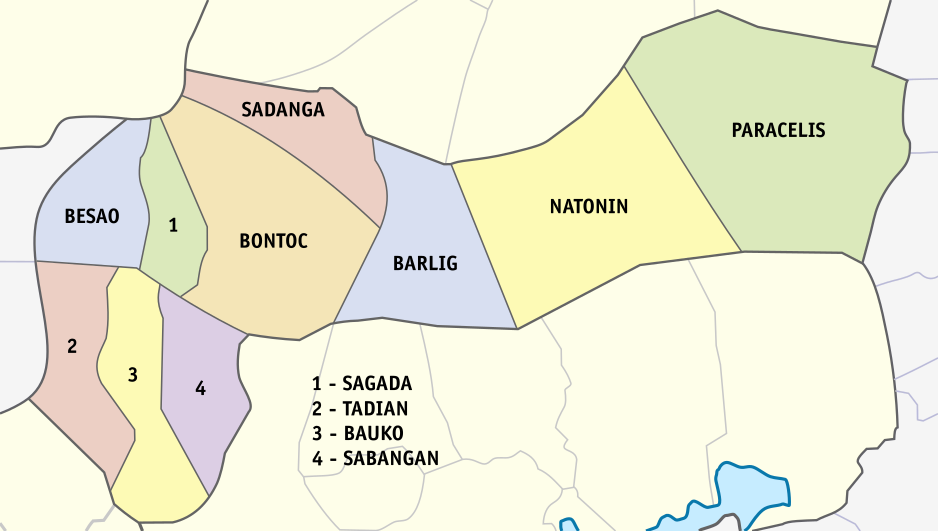
Political divisions

| Municipality (Note: The globe icon marks the town center.) | | Population | | | ±% p.a. | Area | | Density (2020) | | Barangay |
| | | (2020) | | (2015) | | km^{2} | sq mi | /km^{2} | /sq mi | |
|---|---|---|---|---|---|---|---|---|---|---|
| Barlig | | 3.0% | 4,796 | 4,819 | −0.09% | 228.64 | 88.28 | 21 | 54 | 11 |
| Bauko | | 20.2% | 32,021 | 31,065 | +0.58% | 170.37 | 65.78 | 190 | 490 | 22 |
| Besao | | 4.3% | 6,873 | 7,040 | −0.46% | 173.62 | 67.04 | 40 | 100 | 14 |
| Bontoc | † | 15.2% | 24,104 | 24,643 | −0.42% | 396.10 | 152.94 | 61 | 160 | 16 |
| Natonin | | 6.5% | 10,339 | 10,272 | +0.12% | 252.00 | 97.30 | 41 | 110 | 11 |
| Paracelis | | 19.7% | 31,168 | 28,121 | +1.98% | 570.16 | 220.14 | 55 | 140 | 9 |
| Sabangan | | 6.1% | 9,621 | 9,315 | +0.62% | 72.04 | 27.81 | 130 | 340 | 15 |
| Sadanga | | 5.3% | 8,427 | 8,799 | −0.82% | 259.79 | 100.31 | 32 | 83 | 8 |
| Sagada | | 7.3% | 11,510 | 11,127 | +0.65% | 109.71 | 42.36 | 100 | 260 | 19 |
| Tadian | | 12.2% | 19,341 | 19,389 | −0.05% | 157.00 | 60.62 | 120 | 310 | 19 |
| Total | | | 158,200 | 154,590 | +0.44% | 2,157.38 | 922.56 | 66 | 170 | 144 |
| | † Provincial capital | | | | | Municipality | | | | |

=== Barangays ===
Mountain Province has 144 barangays comprising its 10 municipalities.

As of 2010, the most populous barangay in the province is Poblacion in the municipality of Paracelis, with a total of 5,687 inhabitants. Balintaugan in the municipality of Bauko has the least population with only 144.

== Demographics ==
=== Population ===
The population of Mountain Province in the 2024 census was 149,775 people, with a density of 69 inhabitants per square kilometre or 180 inhabitants per square mile.

Population census of Mountain Province

| Year | Pop. | ±% p.a. |
|---|---|---|
| 1903 | 23,441 | — |
| 1918 | 49,055 | +5.05% |
| 1939 | 59,138 | +0.89% |
| 1948 | 62,003 | +0.53% |
| 1960 | 85,866 | +2.75% |
| 1970 | 93,112 | +0.81% |
| 1975 | 94,096 | +0.21% |
| 1980 | 103,052 | +1.83% |

| Year | Pop. | ±% p.a. |
|---|---|---|
| 1990 | 116,535 | +1.24% |
| 1995 | 130,755 | +2.18% |
| 2000 | 140,439 | +1.54% |
| 2007 | 148,661 | +0.79% |
| 2010 | 154,187 | +1.34% |
| 2015 | 154,590 | +0.05% |
| 2020 | 158,200 | +0.49% |
| 2024 | 149,775 | −1.31% |

Source: Philippine Statistics Authority

=== Ethnicity ===
Based on the 2020 census survey, Kankanaey comprised 33.1% (52,226) of the total provincial household population of 157,798. Applai came in second at 18.37% (28,986), followed by Bontok at 14.55% (22,963) and Baliwon at 14.09% (22,241). Other significant ethnicities were the Balangao at 7.8% (12,310), Ilocano at 4.54% (7,163), and Kalinga at 2.6% (4,095).

Population by ethnicity (2020)
| Ethnicity | Number |
| Kankanaey | 52,226 (33.10%) |
| Applai | 28,986 (18.37%) |
| Bontok | 22,963 (14.55%) |
| Baliwon | 22,241 (14.09%) |
| Balangao | 12,310 (7.8%) |
| Ilocano | 7,163 (4.54%) |
| Kalinga | 4,095 (2.6%) |
| Other ethnicities | 7,814 (4.95%) |
| Not Reported | 1 (0%) |

=== Languages ===
The main languages of Mountain Province are:

- Kankanaey, spoken in Bauko, Tadian, Besao, Sabangan, and Sagada
- Bontoc spoken in Sadanga, Bontoc, and Barlig
- Balangaw spoken in Natonin and some parts of Paracelis
- Majukayong Kalinga spoken in Barangay Maducayan and Barangay Saliok in Natonin
- Gaddang spoken by the Baliwons/Ga'dangs of Paracelis

Ilocano is used as a lingua franca in the province and is widely spoken and understood by the residents.

=== Religion ===
==== Christianity ====
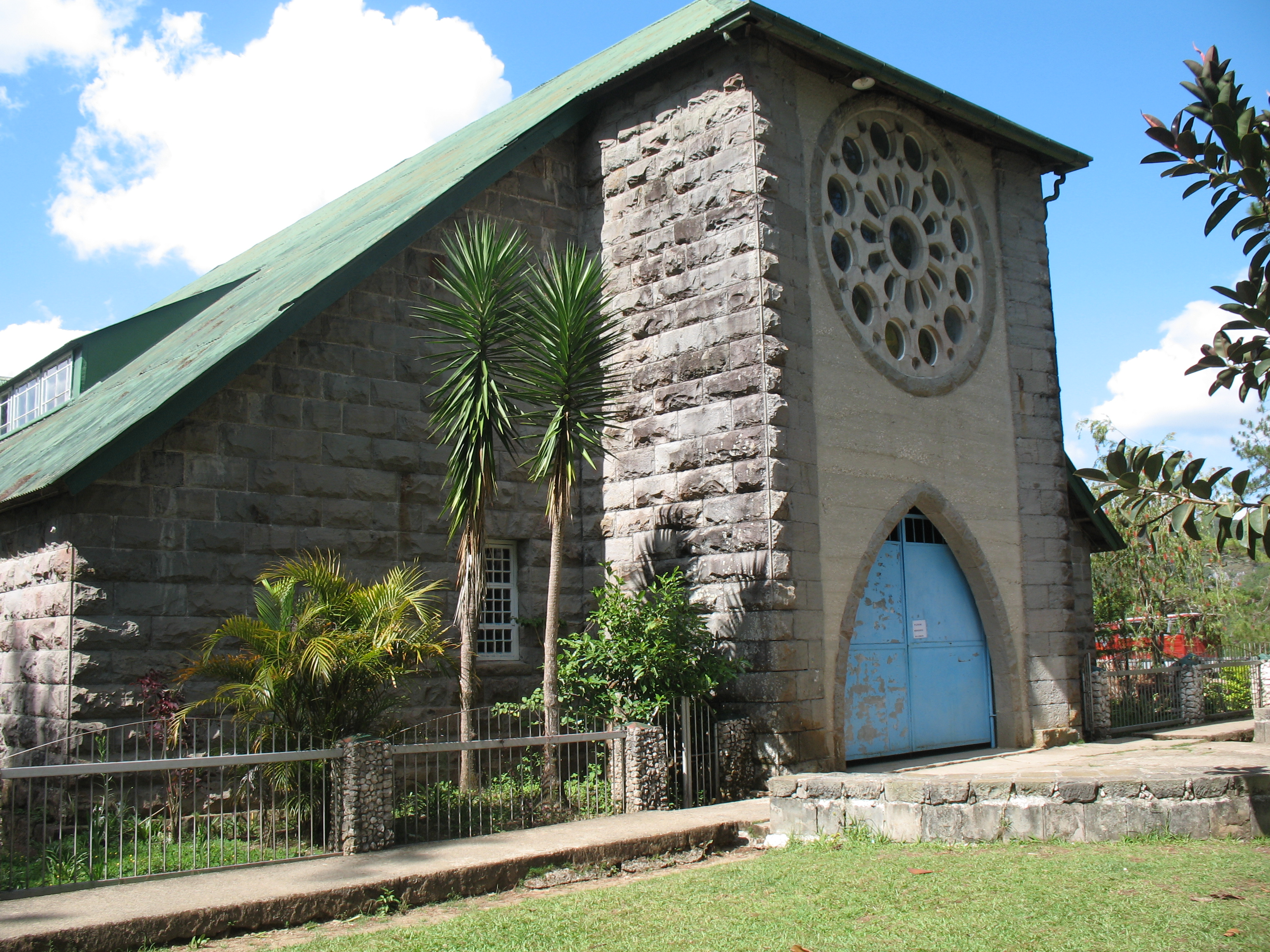
An Anglican church in Sagada

Anglicanism predominates in the province with approximately 60% adherence to other religions such as Roman Catholicism.

==== Others ====
Other groups include Members of Church of God International (MCGI), Seventh-Day Adventist Church, Iglesia Filipina Indepiendente, Iglesia ni Cristo (which has 3% of the Listing Members in the province), and Evangelical Christianity churches. Mountain Province is the only predominantly Protestant province in the Philippines.

== Economy ==
Poverty incidence of Mountain Province (%)

Source: Philippine Statistics Authority

The economy of Mountain Province is predominantly agricultural, bolstered by a growing tourism industry and a developing trade sector, with a recorded GDP of ₱16.40 billion in 2024, representing a 3.4% growth rate. As a landlocked, mountainous region in the Cordillera Administrative Region, its economic backbone relies on farming—specifically rice, camote, gabi, and high-value vegetables like tomatoes and potatoes—particularly in municipalities like Bauko and Paracelis, while Sagada serves as a major tourist hub known for its scenic rice terraces, caves, and eco-tourism activities. The capital, Bontoc, acts as the central hub for commerce and trade, with other income sources including small-scale mining, the gathering of forest products, and local handicrafts. In recent years, the province has focused on recovering its economy through sustainable tourism and improved agricultural production to elevate its financial standing, with some municipalities showing significant increases in income.

== Tourism ==
The province has several rice terraces in seven of its different towns:

- Ambasing Rice Terraces — Sagada
- Bangaan Rice Terraces — Sagada
- Bangen Rice Terraces — Bauko
- Barlig Rice Terraces — Barlig
- Bayyo Rice Terraces — Bontoc
- Besao Rice Terraces — Besao
- Bontoc Poblacion Rice Terraces — Bontoc
- Bucas Rice Terraces — Besao
- Bulongan Rice Terraces — Sagada
- Dalican Rice Terraces — Bontoc
- Fidelisan Rice Terraces — Sagada
- Focong Rice Terraces — Sadanga
- Kapayawan Rice Terraces — Bauko
- Kiltepan Rice Terraces — Sagada
- Maligcong Rice Terraces — Bontoc
- Natonin Rice Terraces — Natonin
- Sadanga Rice Terraces — Sadanga
- Suyo Rice Terraces — Sagada
- Tanulong Rice Terraces — Sagada

The mountainous province also offers excellent mountain climbing experiences with two of its mountains among the top 10 highest points in the Philippines:

- Mount Kalawitan, 2,714+msl - Sabangan
- Mount Amuyao or Mount Finaroy, 2,702+msl - Barlig
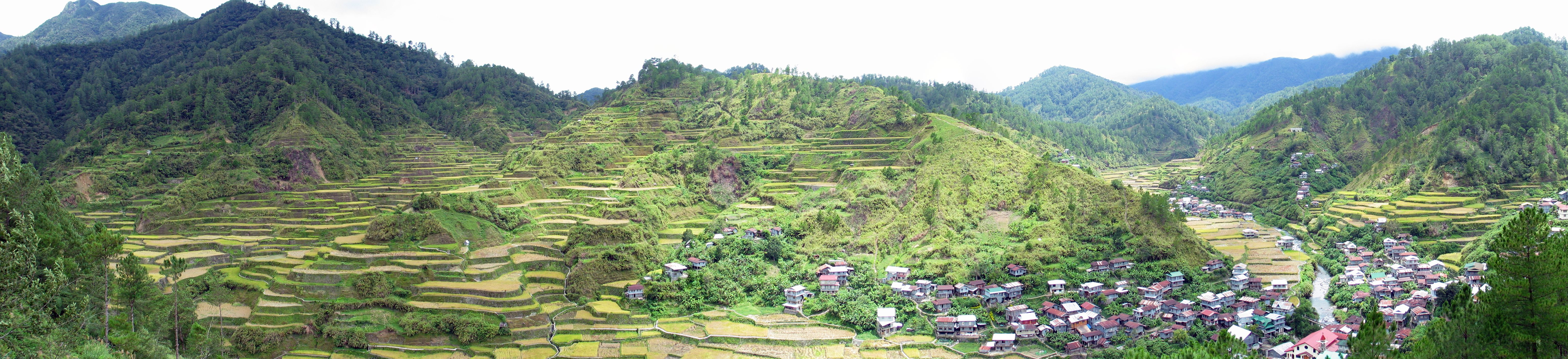
Rice terraces in Barlig

== Government ==
=== List of recent governors ===
- 2001–2004 — Sario M. Malinias
- 2004–2010 — Maximo B. Dalog
- 2010–2016 — Leonard G. Mayaen
- 2016–present — Bonifacio C. Lacwasan Jr.

== Notable people ==
- Jeyrick Sigmaton - actor and model
- Marky Cielo - actor
- Francisco Claver - Roman Catholic bishop, Jesuit, and human rights activist
- Eduardo Masferré - Filipino-Catalan photographer regarded as the Father of Philippine photography.
- William Henry Scott - Historian and Episcopalian missionary best known for numerous books on the Cordilleran peoples and on Precolonial Philippines.
