= Sadanga =

Municipality in Mountain Province, Philippines

- Municipality
- Municipality of Sadanga
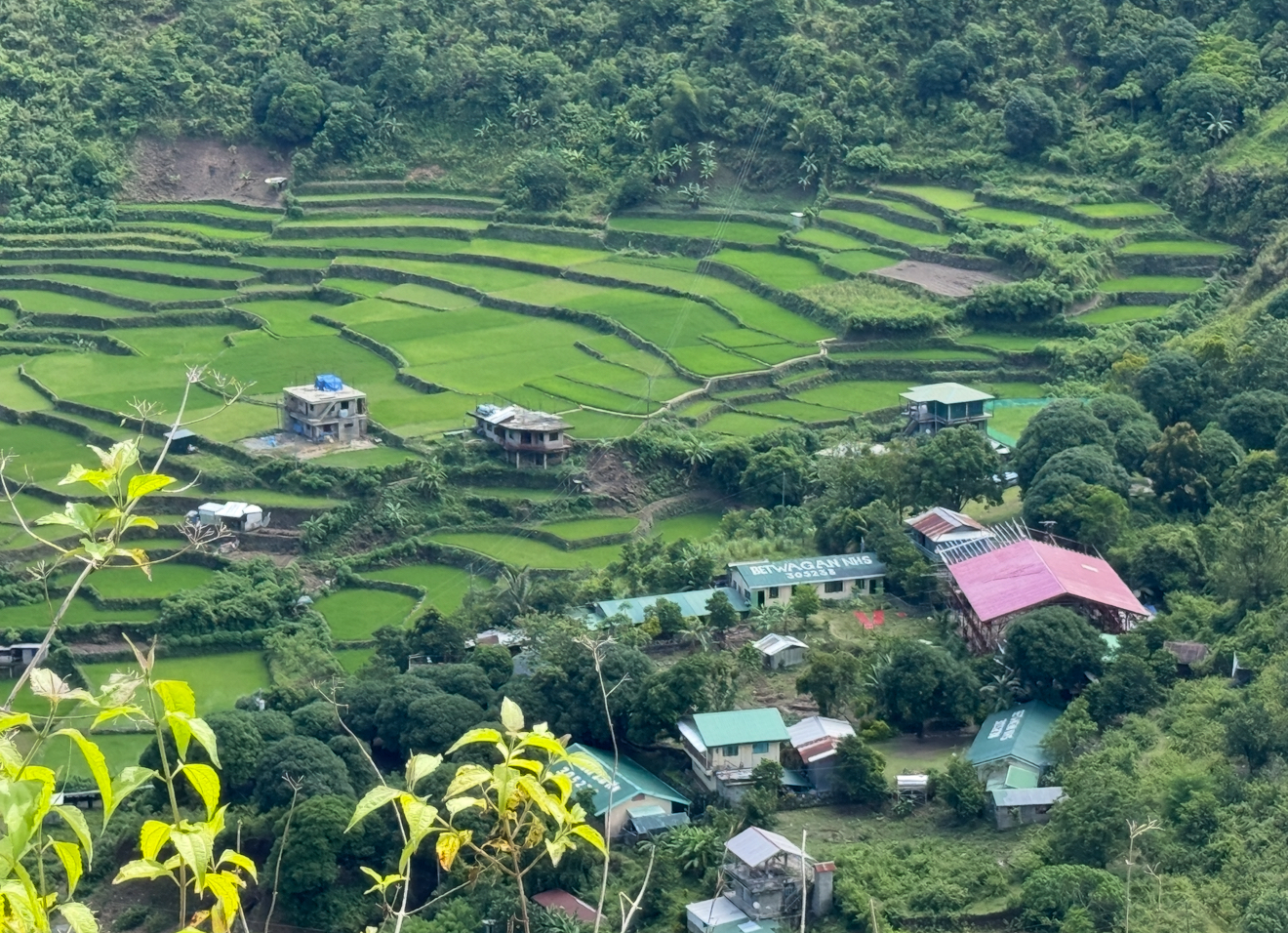
- Rice terraces in Betwagan

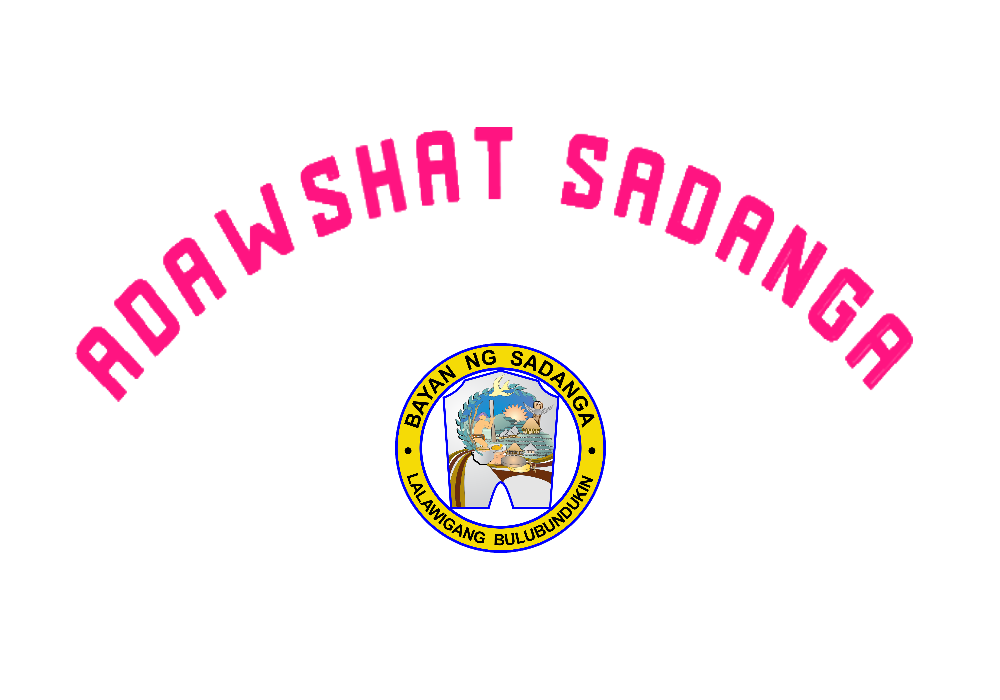
- Flag Seal

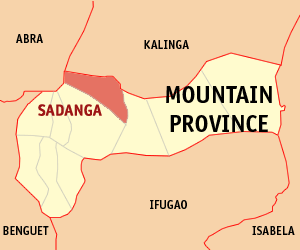
- Map of Mountain Province with Sadanga highlighted
- Interactive map of Sadanga
- Location within the Philippines
- Coordinates: 17°10′05″N 121°01′35″E
- Country: Philippines
- Region: Cordillera Administrative Region
- Province: Mountain Province
- District: Lone district
- Barangays: 8 (see Barangays)

Government
  - Type: Sangguniang Bayan
  - Mayor: Albert T. Ayao-ao
  - Vice Mayor: Daniel G. Dawadeo
  - Representative: Maximo Y. Dalug Jr.
  - Electorate: 6,363 voters (2025)

Area
  - Total: 83.30 km^{2} (32.16 sq mi)
- Elevation: 1,205 m (3,953 ft)
- Highest elevation: 1,980 m (6,500 ft)
- Lowest elevation: 632 m (2,073 ft)

Population (2024 census)
  - Total: 7,781
  - Density: 93.41/km^{2} (241.9/sq mi)
  - Households: 1,748

Economy
  - Income class: 5th municipal income class
  - Poverty incidence: 30.55% (2023)
  - Revenue: ₱ 91.89 million (2024)
  - Assets: ₱ 335.3 million (2024)
  - Expenditure: ₱ 93.09 million (2024)
  - Liabilities: ₱ 35.37 million (2024)

Service provider
  - Electricity: Mountain Province Electric Cooperative (MOPRECO)
- Time zone: UTC+8 (PST)
- ZIP code: 2617
- PSGC: 1404408000
- IDD : area code: +63 (0)74
- Native languages: Balangao; Sinadanga; Ilocano; Tagalog
- Website: www.sadanga.gov.ph

Sadanga (IPA: [sʌ.dʌŋˈɡa]), officially the Municipality of Sadanga is a municipality in the province of Mountain Province, Philippines. According to the 2024 census, it has a population of 7,781 people.

The municipality is the only place in the world where the Sinadanga language is used. The language is highly significant in the Sinadanga culture, making its conservation an utmost importance to the survival of the Sinadanga people's traditions.

== History ==
=== Chico River Dam Project ===
Sadanga was one of several municipalities in Mountain Province which would have been flooded by the Chico River Dam Project during the Marcos dictatorship, alongside Bauko, Bontoc, Sabangan, Sagada, and parts of Barlig. However, the indigenous peoples of Kalinga Province and Mountain Province resisted the project and when hostilities resulted in the murder of Macli-ing Dulag, the project became unpopular and was abandoned before Marcos was ousted by the 1986 People Power Revolution.

== Geography ==
Sadanga is situated 23.54 kilometres (14.63 mi) from the provincial capital Bontoc, and 410.64 kilometres (255.16 mi) from the country's capital city of Manila.

=== Barangays ===
Sadanga is politically subdivided into 8 barangays. Each barangay consists of puroks and some have sitios.

- Anabel
- Bekigan
- Belwang
- Betwagan
- Demang
- Poblacion
- Sacasacan
- Saclit

=== Climate ===
Climate data for Sadanga, Mountain Province
Month	Jan	Feb	Mar	Apr	May	Jun	Jul	Aug	Sep	Oct	Nov	Dec	Year
Mean daily maximum °C (°F)	20 (68)	21 (70)	23 (73)	25 (77)	24 (75)	24 (75)	23 (73)	23 (73)	23 (73)	23 (73)	22 (72)	20 (68)	23 (73)
Mean daily minimum °C (°F)	13 (55)	14 (57)	15 (59)	17 (63)	18 (64)	18 (64)	18 (64)	18 (64)	18 (64)	16 (61)	15 (59)	14 (57)	16 (61)
Average precipitation mm (inches)	35 (1.4)	46 (1.8)	63 (2.5)	117 (4.6)	402 (15.8)	400 (15.7)	441 (17.4)	471 (18.5)	440 (17.3)	258 (10.2)	94 (3.7)	68 (2.7)	2,835 (111.6)
Average rainy days	9.9	19.5	13.9	18.9	26.0	27.3	28.9	28.5	26.1	19.7	14.5	12.8	246
Source: Meteoblue (modeled/calculated data, not measured locally)

== Demographics ==
Population census of Sadanga

Year	Pop.	±% p.a.
1918	3,956	—
1939	2,933	−1.41%
1948	3,930	+3.30%
1960	5,967	+3.54%
1970	5,115	−1.53%

Year	Pop.	±% p.a.
1975	5,909	+2.94%
1980	6,650	+2.39%
1990	7,302	+0.94%
1995	8,373	+2.60%
2000	8,596	+0.57%

Year	Pop.	±% p.a.
2007	9,706	+1.69%
2010	9,181	−2.00%
2015	8,799	−0.81%
2020	8,427	−0.91%
2024	7,781	−1.90%

Source: Philippine Statistics Authority

In the 2024 census, the population of Sadanga was 7,781 people, with a density of 93 inhabitants per square kilometer or 240 inhabitants per square mile.

== Economy ==
Poverty incidence of Sadanga (%)

Source: Philippine Statistics Authority

The main economic source of Sadanga is agriculture. Major harvests include rice, legumes, peanuts, sweet potatoes, and vegetables. Other livelihood sources of Sadanga are sugarcane, fayash, and aquaculture.

The tourist attractions of Sadanga include Belwang Rice Terraces, Fowa-as Falls, and local hot springs.

== Government ==
=== Local government ===
Sadanga, belonging to the lone congressional district of the province of Mountain Province, is governed by a mayor designated as its local chief executive and by a municipal council as its legislative body in accordance with the Local Government Code. The mayor, vice mayor, and the councilors are elected directly by the people through an election which is being held every three years.

=== Elected officials ===
Members of the Municipal Council (2025–2028)
Position	Name
Congressman	Maximo Y. Dalog Jr.
Mayor	Robert B. Wanawan
Vice-Mayor	Geraldo F. Ackut Jr.
Councilors	Daniel G. Dawadeo
Councilors	Rufino C. Chakiwag
Councilors	James M. Fidchongkas
Councilors	Napoleon P. Sarang-ey
Councilors	Alonso P. Fattit
Councilors	Albert T. Ayao-ao
Councilors	Rudy S. Yakak
Councilors	Eduardo C. Amboni Jr.

== Culture ==
The town has its indigenous council of elders who make decisions for the indigenous Isadanga people. The Isadanga have their own language, called the Sinadanga, which is preserved by the people themselves by using it in homes, schools, and everyday life more than the national language. The Sinadanga language is one of the hardest languages to learn from the Cordilleras. The people also have their own back-strap loom weaving culture, epic chants for planting and harvesting rice, rice terracing practices, indigenous rituals to the gods such as the pumatay (ritual where pawid stalks are burnt while cooking meat, then the food is served to the gods), and vernacular house architecture.

The most prominent tradition of the Isadanga people is the enforcement of the teer (day of rest) and closure of the village from visitors. The tradition begins with a meeting of the council of elders within the center of the town. The council negotiates with its members on whether they should close the village or not and when. Once a truce has been made, the elders will drink their traditional wine and one of the elders will announce the decision via public statement, which can be heard throughout the village valley. The tradition is made so that for a period of time, the Isadanga townsfolk can rest from their traditional work, and can manage to converse and strengthen their bonds with each other through public engagement with their neighbors.

The next step after the announcement is made is to establish the fayavey (long tree stalks) at both sides of the road entrance of the town. The establishment of the fayavey directly puts the town closure in effect, and thus, negates all visitors from visiting the town. The council of elders input a guard at the town's entrance and the fayavey to protect the town from unwanted visitors. The fayavey is also the main symbol of the Isadanga's teer. On the imposition of the fayavey, the people are usually seen within the ator or place of public engagement. The fayavey is disestablished on a certain day and time as agreed upon by the council of elders.

== Environment ==
The environment of Sadanga is serene and clear from garbage as cleanliness for the environment is a norm in Sadanga culture. Sadanga is home to the Fowa-As falls, a sacred water source. Littering and any other form of destruction within the site, and the entire valley in general, is strictly prohibited.

== Education ==
The Sadanga Schools District Office governs all educational institutions within the municipality. It oversees the management and operations of all private and public, from primary to secondary schools.

=== Primary and elementary schools ===
- Anabel Elementary School
- Bekigan Elementary School
- Belwang Elementary School
- Betwagan Elementary School
- Demang Elementary School
- Sacasacan Elementary School
- Saclit Elementary School
- Sadanga Central School

=== Secondary schools ===
- Belwang National High School
- Betwagan National High School
- Saclit National High School
- Sadanga National Technical Vocational and Skills Training High School

== Sister cities ==
- Quezon City, since October 2004
