= Besao =

Municipality in Mountain Province, Philippines

- Municipality
- Municipality of Besao
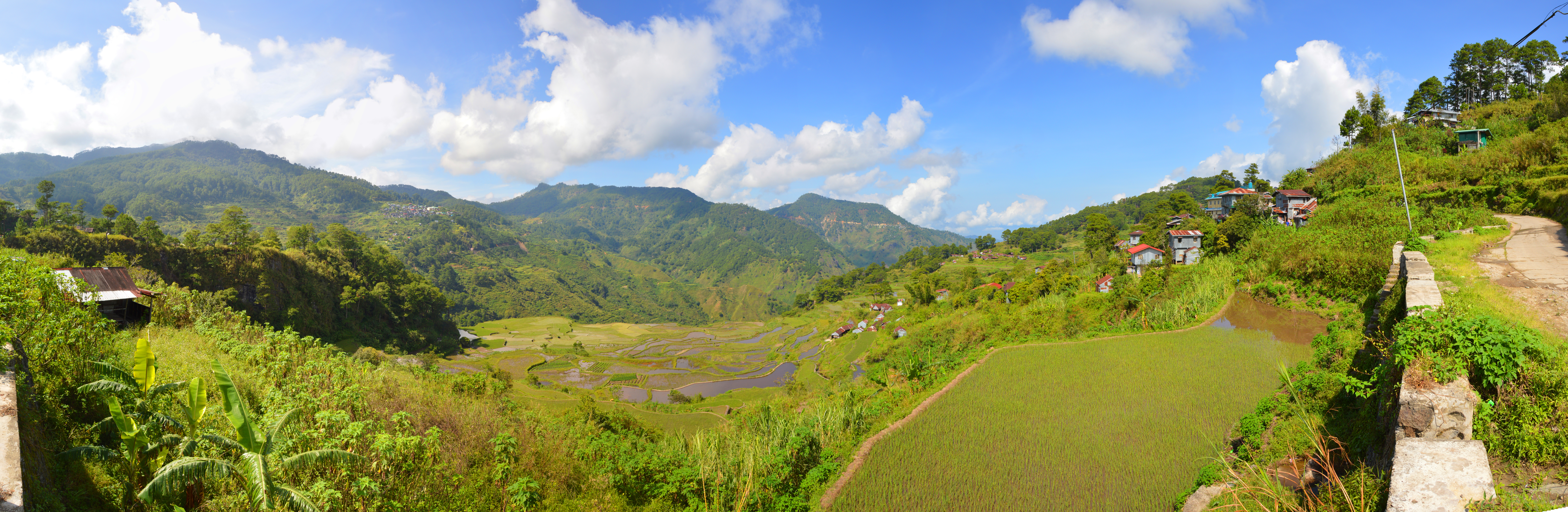

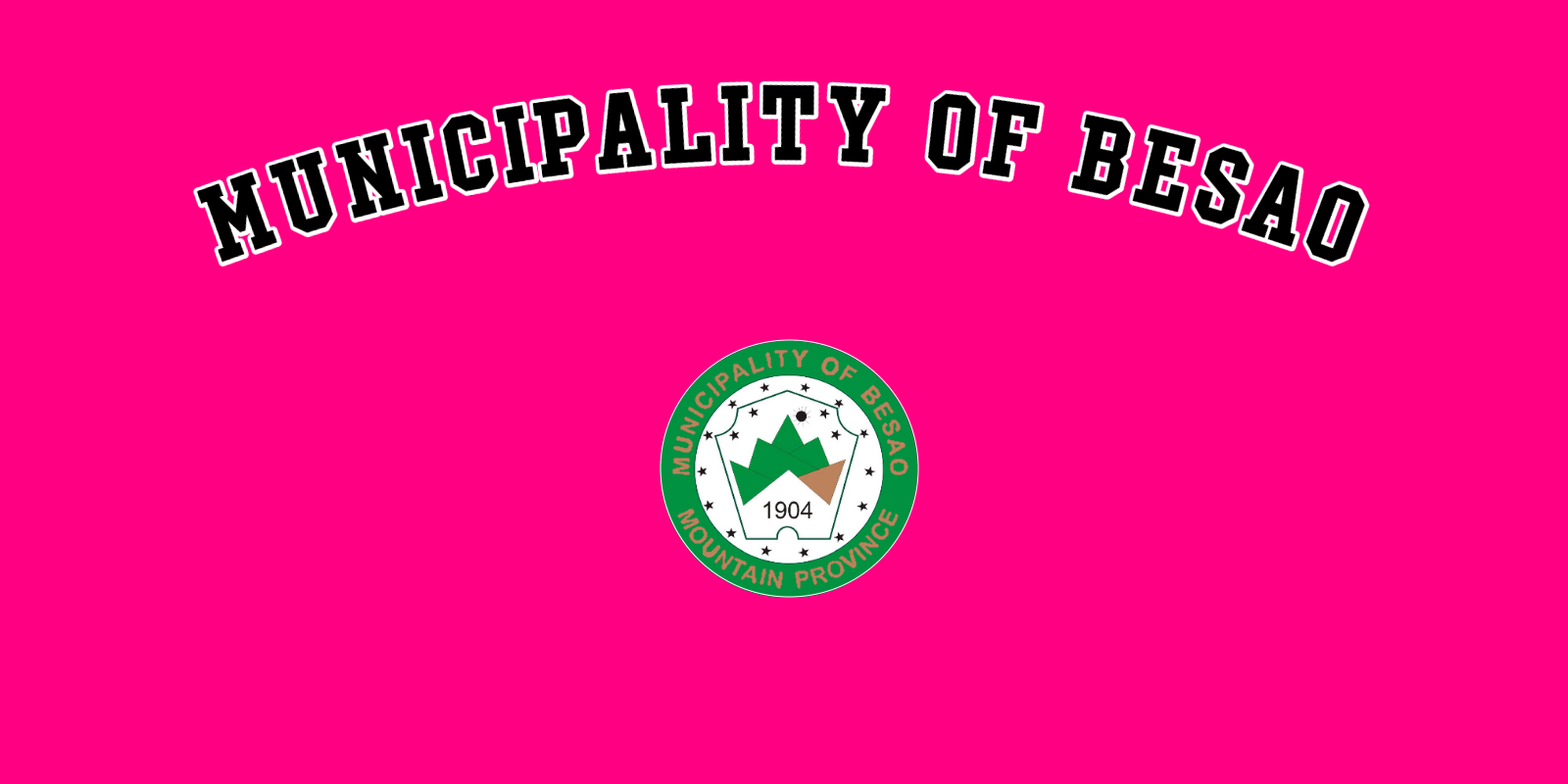
- Flag Seal

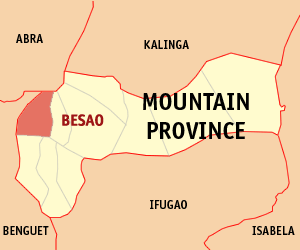
- Map of Mountain Province with Besao highlighted
- Interactive map of Besao
- Location within the Philippines
- Coordinates: 17°05′43″N 120°51′22″E
- Country: Philippines
- Region: Cordillera Administrative Region
- Province: Mountain Province
- District: Lone district
- Founded: 1904
- Barangays: 14 (see Barangays)

Government
  - Type: Sangguniang Bayan
  - Mayor: Bryne O. Bacwaden
  - Vice Mayor: Elizabeth A. Buyagan
  - Representative: Maximo Y. Dalog Jr.
  - Municipal Council: Members: Johnny D. Ambucay; Arleigh L. Pekas; Raphael V. Clemente; Joel D. Lacsigen; Marcos I. Mangallay; Benny S. Ballang; Henry D. Bosigen; Alfredo S. Beyden
  - Electorate: 6,277 voters (2025)

Area
  - Total: 173.62 km^{2} (67.04 sq mi)
- Elevation: 1,405 m (4,610 ft)
- Highest elevation: 2,059 m (6,755 ft)
- Lowest elevation: 721 m (2,365 ft)

Population (2024 census)
  - Total: 6,315
  - Density: 36.37/km^{2} (94.20/sq mi)
  - Households: 1,738

Economy
  - Income class: 4th municipal income class
  - Poverty incidence: 13.99% (2023)
  - Revenue: ₱ 111.8 million (2024)
  - Assets: ₱ 465.2 million (2024)
  - Expenditure: ₱ 110.5 million (2024)
  - Liabilities: ₱ 145.6 million (2024)

Service provider
  - Electricity: Mountain Province Electric Cooperative (MOPRECO)
- Time zone: UTC+8 (PST)
- ZIP code: 2618
- PSGC: 1404403000
- IDD : area code: +63 (0)74
- Native languages: Balangao; Bontoc; Ilocano; Tagalog; Applai Kankanaey
- Website: besao.gov.ph

Besao, officially the Municipality of Besao is a municipality in the province of Mountain Province, Philippines. According to the 2024 census, it has a population of 6,315 people.

The town is known for the Agawa people's Agricultural Stone Calendar of Gueday. The stone calendar is one of the most enigmatic artifact in the Cordillera mountains. It is a testimony to the accurate scientific outlook of the ancient Agawa people in the cycle of weathers, agriculture, and heavenly bodies.

== Geography ==
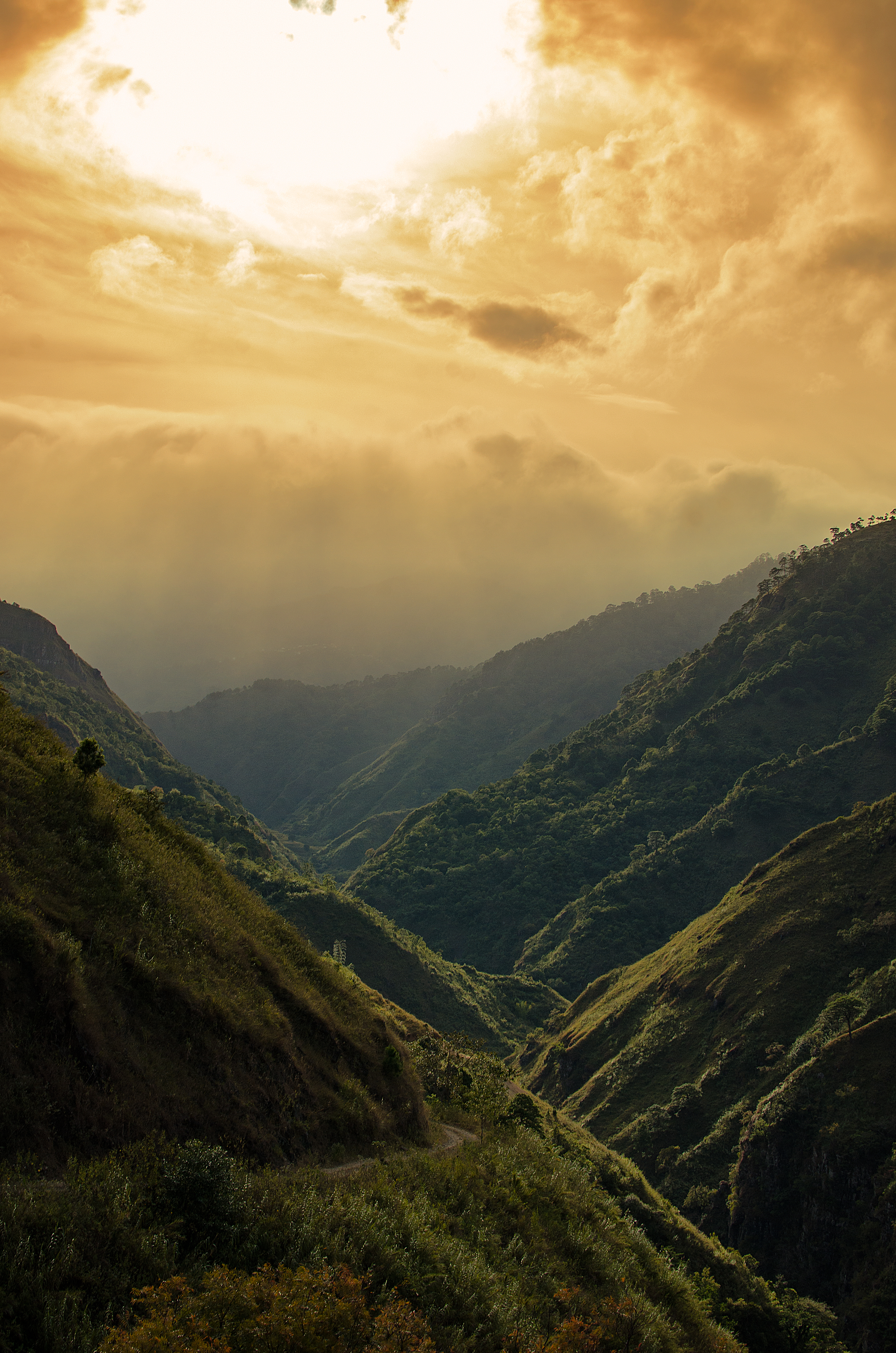
Cordillera Central mountains in Besao

Besao is situated 25.43 kilometres (15.80 mi) from the provincial capital Bontoc, and 394.55 kilometres (245.16 mi) from the country's capital city of Manila.

=== Barangays ===
Besao is politically subdivided into 14 barangays. Each barangay consists of puroks and some have sitios.

- Agawa
- Ambagiw
- Banguitan
- Besao East
- Besao West
- Catengan
- Gueday
- Kin-iway (Poblacion)
- Lacmaan
- Laylaya
- Padangaan
- Payeo
- Suquib
- Tamboan

=== Climate ===
Climate data for Besao, Mountain Province
Month	Jan	Feb	Mar	Apr	May	Jun	Jul	Aug	Sep	Oct	Nov	Dec	Year
Mean daily maximum °C (°F)	19 (66)	20 (68)	21 (70)	23 (73)	23 (73)	22 (72)	21 (70)	21 (70)	21 (70)	21 (70)	20 (68)	19 (66)	21 (70)
Mean daily minimum °C (°F)	12 (54)	12 (54)	13 (55)	15 (59)	16 (61)	17 (63)	17 (63)	17 (63)	16 (61)	15 (59)	14 (57)	13 (55)	15 (59)
Average precipitation mm (inches)	35 (1.4)	46 (1.8)	63 (2.5)	117 (4.6)	402 (15.8)	400 (15.7)	441 (17.4)	471 (18.5)	440 (17.3)	258 (10.2)	94 (3.7)	68 (2.7)	2,835 (111.6)
Average rainy days	9.9	19.5	13.9	18.9	26.0	27.3	28.9	28.5	26.1	19.7	14.5	12.8	246
Source: Meteoblue (modeled/calculated data, not measured locally)

== Demographics ==
Population census of Besao

Year	Pop.	±% p.a.
1918	4,642	—
1939	5,144	+0.49%
1948	5,799	+1.34%
1960	8,174	+2.90%
1970	9,286	+1.28%

Year	Pop.	±% p.a.
1975	7,051	−5.37%
1980	9,093	+5.22%
1990	8,473	−0.70%
1995	9,147	+1.44%
2000	9,875	+1.66%

Year	Pop.	±% p.a.
2007	7,295	−4.09%
2010	7,818	+2.55%
2015	7,040	−1.98%
2020	6,873	−0.50%
2024	6,315	−2.01%

Source: Philippine Statistics Authority

The population of the town has been decreasing due to younger generations migrating to cities seeking for work.

In the 2024 census, the population of Besao was 6,315 people, with a density of 36 inhabitants per square kilometer or 93 inhabitants per square mile.

=== Religion ===
Besao, old traditional practices such as animal sacrifices (referred to as korban) were once a way to honor Kabunian (GOD), seek favor, ask for forgiveness, as well as for cleansing and thanksgiving. However, Christianity, specifically Episcopalianism, was introduced by American missionaries in the early 1900s, gradually becoming the dominant faith in the region. Besao's other practices include elements of animism. While animist traditions exist, they are not the primary faith of the community. The town is one of the few in the southern Cordillera mountains where aspects of ancestral worship and intangible heritage have been preserved by the older generations. However, with younger generations migrating to cities, these traditions face significant challenges to their continuity. Additionally, Christian groups have been gaining influence in the town, further contributing to changes in its religious landscape.

== Economy ==
Poverty incidence of Besao (%)

Source: Philippine Statistics Authority

Besao's economy focuses on agriculture and micro-enterprises. Besao's agricultural production includes cash crops and Arabica coffee. Besao's economy is supported by micro-enterprises producing regional commodities.

== Government ==
=== Local government ===
Besao, belonging to the lone congressional district of the province of Mountain Province, is governed by a mayor designated as its local chief executive and by a municipal council as its legislative body in accordance with the Local Government Code. The mayor, vice mayor, and the councilors are elected directly by the people through an election which is being held every three years.

=== Elected officials ===
Members of the Municipal Council (2025–2028)
Position	Name
Congressman	Maximo Y. Dalog Jr.
Mayor	Bryne O. Bacwaden
Vice-Mayor	Elizabeth A. Buyagan
Councilors	Charles D. Yapyapan
Councilors	Arleigh L. Pekas
Councilors	Daisy B. Buking
Councilors	Bart P. Guzman
Councilors	Marcos I. Mangallay
Councilors	Adela P. Ballang
Councilors	Johnny D. Ambucay Sr.
Councilors	Joel D. Lacsigen

== Education ==
The Besao Schools District Office governs all educational institutions within the municipality. It oversees the management and operations of all private and public, from primary to secondary schools.

=== Primary and elementary schools ===
- Agawa Elementary School
- Ambagiw Elementary School
- Banguitan Elementary School
- Besao Central School
- Besao Elementary School
- Bunga Elementary School
- Catengan Elementary School
- Dandanac Elementary School
- Gueday Elementary School
- Lacmaan Primary School
- Masameyeo Primary School
- Panabungen Elementary School
- Pangweo Elementary School
- Payeo Elementary School
- Suquib Primary School
- Tambuan Elementary School

=== Secondary schools ===
- Agawa National High School
- Banguitan National High School
- Besao National High School
- Panabungen School of Arts, trades, and Home Industries
- St. James High School of Mountain Province
- Tamboan National High School
