= Tadian =

Municipality in Mountain Province, Philippines

- Municipality
- Municipality of Tadian, Municipality of Kayan, Municipal District of Kayan
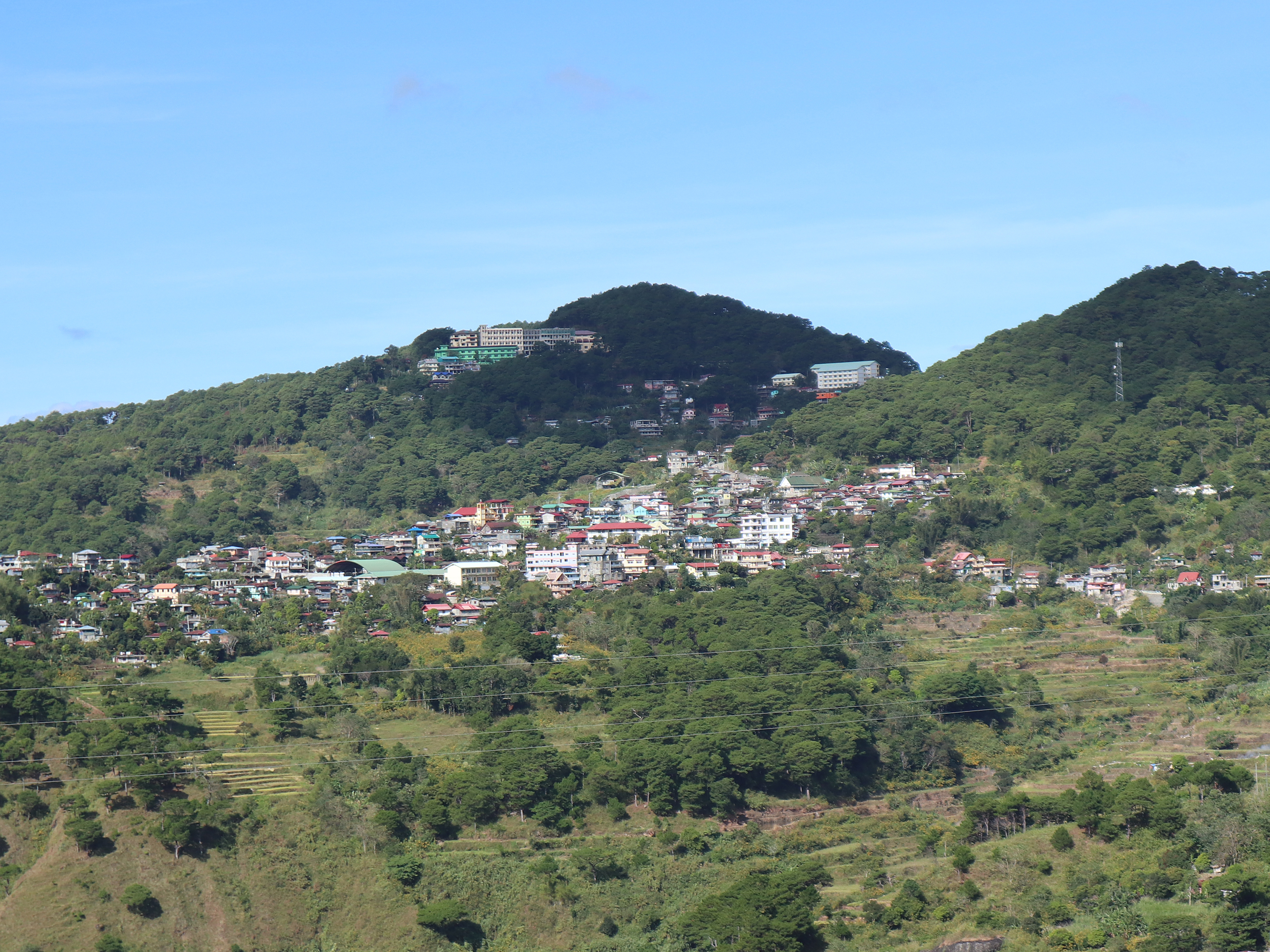

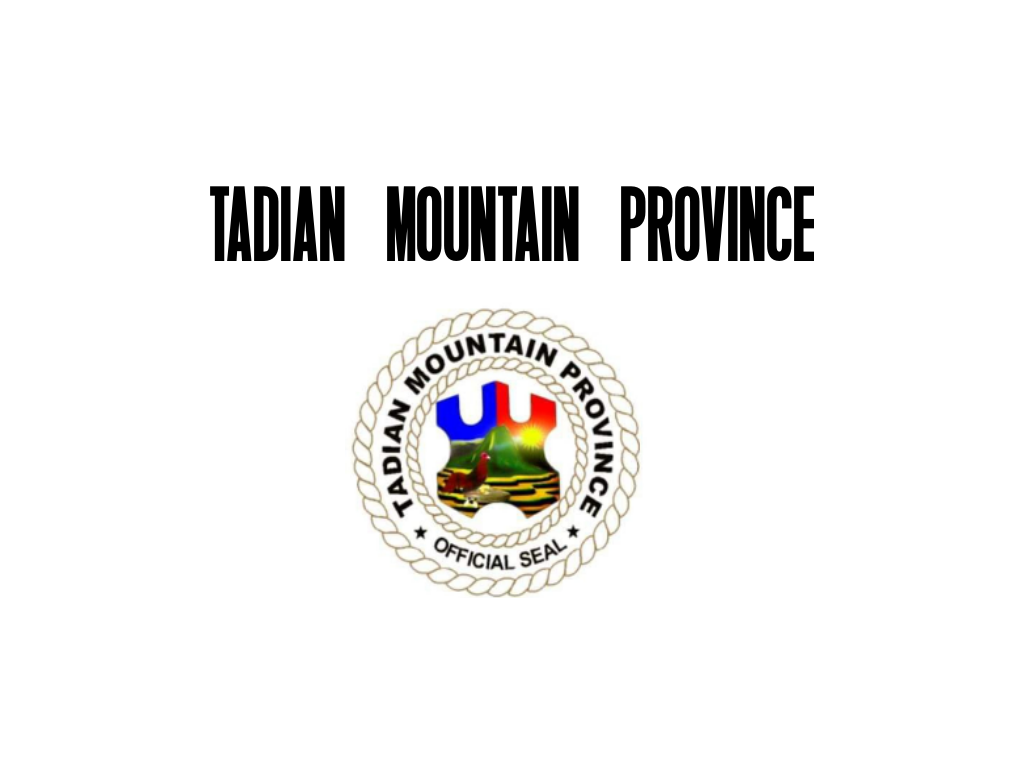
- Flag Seal

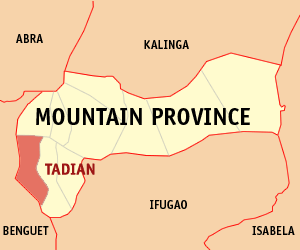
- Map of Mountain Province with Tadian highlighted
- Interactive map of Tadian
- Location within the Philippines
- Coordinates: 16°59′46″N 120°49′15″E
- Country: Philippines
- Region: Cordillera Administrative Region
- Province: Mountain Province
- District: Lone district
- Barangays: 19 (see Barangays)

Government
  - Type: Sangguniang Bayan
  - Mayor: Constito S. Masweng
  - Vice Mayor: Alfonso D. Polan
  - Representative: Maximo Y. Dalog Jr.
  - Electorate: 12,340 voters (2025)

Area
  - Total: 145.20 km^{2} (56.06 sq mi)
- Elevation: 1,142 m (3,747 ft)
- Highest elevation: 1,932 m (6,339 ft)
- Lowest elevation: 550 m (1,800 ft)

Population (2024 census)
  - Total: 18,073
  - Density: 124.47/km^{2} (322.38/sq mi)
  - Households: 4,484

Economy
  - Income class: 3rd municipal income class
  - Poverty incidence: 20.18% (2023)
  - Revenue: ₱ 141.5 million (2024)
  - Assets: ₱ 343.2 million (2024)
  - Expenditure: ₱ 136.7 million (2024)
  - Liabilities: ₱ 227.7 million (2024)

Service provider
  - Electricity: Mountain Province Electric Cooperative (MOPRECO)
- Time zone: UTC+8 (PST)
- ZIP code: 2620
- PSGC: 1404410000
- IDD : area code: +63 (0)74
- Native languages: Kankanaey; Balangao; Bontoc; Ilocano; Tagalog
- Website: tadian.gov.ph

Tadian, officially the Municipality of Tadian is a municipality in the province of Mountain Province, Philippines. According to the 2024 census, it has a population of 18,073 people.

== History ==
Tadian was formerly known as Kayan. In 1957, the seat of government was transferred to the barrio of Tadian. Two years later the town was renamed to Tadian.

== Geography ==
Tadian is situated 35.92 kilometres (22.32 mi) from the provincial capital Bontoc, and 369.40 kilometres (229.53 mi) from the country's capital city of Manila.

=== Barangays ===
Tadian is politically subdivided into 19 barangays. Each barangay consists of puroks and some have sitios.

- Balaoa
- Banaao
- Bantey
- Batayan
- Bunga
- Cadad-anan
- Cagubatan
- Dacudac
- Duagan
- Kayan East
- Kayan West
- Lenga
- Lubon (Lub-ong)
- Mabalite
- Masla
- Pandayan
- Poblacion
- Sumadel
- Tue

=== Climate ===
Climate data for Tadian, Mountain Province
Month	Jan	Feb	Mar	Apr	May	Jun	Jul	Aug	Sep	Oct	Nov	Dec	Year
Mean daily maximum °C (°F)	20 (68)	21 (70)	22 (72)	24 (75)	24 (75)	23 (73)	22 (72)	22 (72)	22 (72)	22 (72)	21 (70)	20 (68)	22 (72)
Mean daily minimum °C (°F)	13 (55)	13 (55)	14 (57)	16 (61)	17 (63)	18 (64)	17 (63)	18 (64)	17 (63)	16 (61)	15 (59)	14 (57)	16 (60)
Average precipitation mm (inches)	35 (1.4)	46 (1.8)	63 (2.5)	117 (4.6)	402 (15.8)	400 (15.7)	441 (17.4)	471 (18.5)	440 (17.3)	258 (10.2)	94 (3.7)	68 (2.7)	2,835 (111.6)
Average rainy days	9.9	19.5	13.9	18.9	26.0	27.3	28.9	28.5	26.1	19.7	14.5	12.8	246
Source: Meteoblue (modeled/calculated data, not measured locally)

== Demographics ==
Population census of Tadian

Year	Pop.	±% p.a.
1903	56	—
1918	4,116	+33.17%
1939	8,072	+3.26%
1948	8,070	−0.00%
1960	10,378	+2.12%
1970	12,833	+2.14%

Year	Pop.	±% p.a.
1975	12,777	−0.09%
1980	13,581	+1.23%
1990	14,369	+0.57%
1995	16,482	+2.60%
2000	18,227	+2.18%
2007	17,148	−0.84%

Year	Pop.	±% p.a.
2010	20,689	+7.07%
2015	19,389	−1.23%
2020	19,341	−0.05%
2024	18,073	−1.61%

Source: Philippine Statistics Authority

In the 2024 census, the population of Tadian was 18,073 people, with a density of 120 inhabitants per square kilometer or 310 inhabitants per square mile.

== Economy ==
Poverty incidence of Tadian (%)

Source: Philippine Statistics Authority

Tadian's economy relies on agriculture. The primary agricultural sources of Tadian are rice, root crops, and highland vegetables. Tadian raises poultry and swine to supplement rural incomes. The DTI established a community market in Tadian.

== Government ==
=== Local government ===
Tadian, belonging to the lone congressional district of the province of Mountain Province, is governed by a mayor designated as its local chief executive and by a municipal council as its legislative body in accordance with the Local Government Code. The mayor, vice mayor, and the councilors are elected directly by the people through an election which is being held every three years.

=== Elected officials ===
Members of the Municipal Council (2025–2028)
Position	Name
Congressman	Maximo Y. Dalog Jr.
Mayor	Constito S. Masweng
Vice-Mayor	George C. Bisen Jr.
Councilors	Juniper K. Kidit Sr.
Councilors	Adolf D. Balangoy
Councilors	Bernard G. Buned
Councilors	John P. Malamnao Jr.
Councilors	Joel P. Atipen
Councilors	Valeria P. Gullod
Councilors	Edmund D. Cawalo
Councilors	Rey A. Adeban

== Education ==
There are two schools district offices which govern all educational institutions within the municipality. They oversee the management and operations of all private and public, from primary to secondary schools. These are Tadian I Schools District Office, and Tadian II Schools District Office.

=== Primary and elementary schools ===
- Abungo Elementary School
- Balaoa Elementary School
- Banaao Elementary School
- Bantey Elementary School
- Batayan Elementary School
- Bunga Elementary School
- Cabunagan Primary School
- Cadad-anan Elementary School
- Dacudac Elementary School
- Cagubatan Elementary School
- Duagan Elementary School
- Ilang Primary School
- Kayan East Elementary School
- Kayan Elementary School
- Lenga Elementary School
- Lubon Elementary School
- Mabalite Elementary School
- Maket-an Elementary School
- Masla Adventist Multigrade School
- Masla Elementary School
- New LubonElementary School
- Pandayan Elementary School
- Saint Michael and All Angels Church
- Sayapot Elementary School
- Sumadel Elementary School
- Tadian Central School
- Tadian Elementary School
- Tue Elementary School
- Vicente Pe Elementary School

=== Secondary schools ===
- Am-am National High School
- Balaoa National High School
- Bunga National High School
- Cagubatan National High School
- Dacudac National High School
- Holy Rosary High School
- Lubon National High School
- Lubon National High School - Mabalite Extension
- Masla National High School
- Subaba National High School
- Tadian School of Arts and Trades

=== Higher educational institution ===
- Mountain Province State Polytechnic College

== See also ==
- List of renamed cities and municipalities in the Philippines
