= Natonin =

Municipality in Mountain Province, Philippines

- Municipality
- Municipality of Natonin
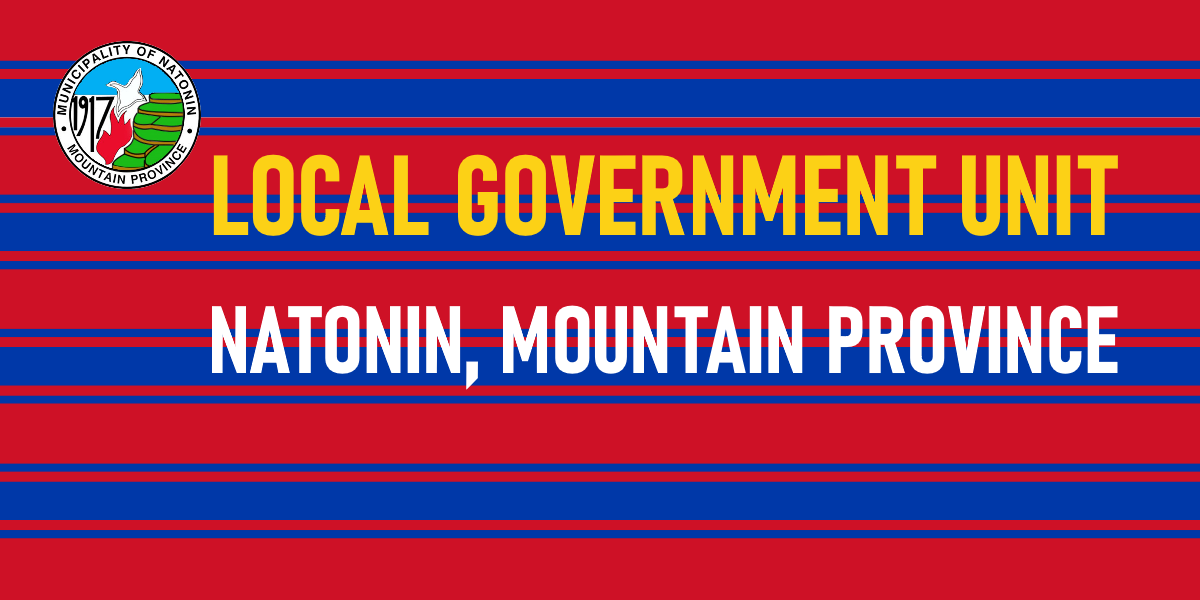
- Flag Seal

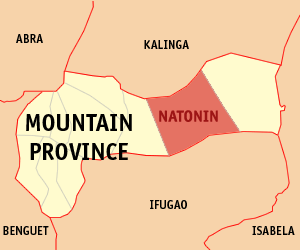
- Map of Mountain Province with Natonin highlighted
- Interactive map of Natonin
- Location within the Philippines
- Coordinates: 17°06′32″N 121°16′47″E
- Country: Philippines
- Region: Cordillera Administrative Region
- Province: Mountain Province
- District: Lone district
- Founded: 1915
- Barangays: 11 (see Barangays)

Government
  - Type: Sangguniang Bayan
  - Mayor: Jose T. Agagon
  - Vice Mayor: Raymundo L. Lapasen
  - Representative: Maximo Y. Dalog Jr.
  - Municipal Council: Members: Rafael L. Bulawe; Jose F. Biangalen; Jerry N. Chumilang; Leon T. Pangsiw; Fernando S. Magranga Jr.; Fernandez D. Linggayo; Oscar L. Fangonon; Jimmy G. Todco
  - Electorate: 8,674 voters (2025)

Area
  - Total: 252.00 km^{2} (97.30 sq mi)
- Elevation: 831 m (2,726 ft)
- Highest elevation: 1,879 m (6,165 ft)
- Lowest elevation: 276 m (906 ft)

Population (2024 census)
  - Total: 8,906
  - Density: 35.34/km^{2} (91.53/sq mi)
  - Households: 2,280

Economy
  - Income class: 3rd municipal income class
  - Poverty incidence: 33.78% (2023)
  - Revenue: ₱ 149.7 million (2024)
  - Assets: ₱ 219 million (2024)
  - Expenditure: ₱ 150.4 million (2024)
  - Liabilities: ₱ 107.3 million (2024)

Service provider
  - Electricity: Mountain Province Electric Cooperative (MOPRECO)
- Time zone: UTC+8 (PST)
- ZIP code: 2624
- PSGC: 1404405000
- IDD : area code: +63 (0)74
- Native languages: Balangao; Majukayang Kalinga; Ilocano; Tagalog

Natonin, officially the Municipality of Natonin (Balangao: Fabrey hen Natonin; Bontok: Ili nan Natonin; Ilocano: Ili ti Natonin; Tagalog: Bayan ng Natonin; Spanish: Municipio de Natonin), is a municipality in the province of Mountain Province, Philippines. According to the 2024 census, it has a population of 8,906 people.

== Etymology ==
The name "Natonin" was first recorded by American Thomasites. Local oral tradition provides three primary theories for the name's origin:

- Matongnin: A place located on the outskirts of the town center. It can be possible that the Americans got it from a native calling that specific place by its name on their first interactions.
- Tongnin: Derived from the local word for "chilly" or "cold," where the phrase magtongnin means "it is cold."
- Mattomnin: A Balangao term literally meaning "eating of cold rice," potentially originating from an invitation to share a meal of breakfast rice.

== History ==
The early settlers of Natonin consisted of hunting and farming tribes who inhabited the region prior to the Spanish colonization of the Philippines. Evidence of their early occupation includes the vast rice terraces carved into mountain slopes using only wooden tools.

Historically, Natonin served as a central agricultural hub, supplying rice to neighboring tribes in Tanudan to the north, Barlig to the west, and Mayoyao to the south. The discovery of ancient Chinese porcelain jars in local households suggests a history of trade ties or shared lineage with ethnic Chinese traders during the pre-colonial era.

=== Ethnogenesis and Tribal Identity ===
Natonin is historically characterized by the presence of four distinct ethno-linguistic groups: the i-Ferangaos (Balangao), i-Ha’ki, i-Majukayongs (Madukayan Kalinga), and i-Kachacrans.

Contrary to popular narratives suggesting the Balangao are descendants of Bontoc or Kalinga intermarriage, linguistic evidence supports a distinct "in situ" development in the Natonin region. Under the Proto-Nuclear Cordilleran Hypothesis, the Balangao language is classified as a primary branch of the Nuclear Cordilleran group, suggesting it developed from a common ancestor alongside, rather than from, neighboring groups.

The inclusion of the i-Majukayongs within the Natonin social fabric further illustrates the area's role as a historical crossroads between the Mountain Province and Kalinga territories, maintaining a unique identity separate from the major centers of those provinces. The peace pacts and peaceful co-existence within the 4 groups paved way for intermarriages in the past years.

== Geography ==
The Municipality of Natonin is bordered by Kalinga to the north, Paracelis to the east, Barlig to the west, and Ifugao to the south. The barangays are mostly carved at the foot of the mountains along which the now National Highway was carved with the exception Barangay Maducayan and some far-flung sitios of Barangay Banawel.

Natonin is situated 73.70 kilometres (45.80 mi) from the provincial capital Bontoc, and 431.85 kilometres (268.34 mi) from the country's capital city of Manila.

=== Barangays ===
Natonin is politically subdivided into 11 barangays. Each barangay consists of puroks and some have sitios.

- Alunogan
- Balangao
- Banao
- Banawal
- Butac
- Maducayan
- Poblacion
- Pudo
- Saliok
- Santa Isabel
- Tonglayan

=== Climate ===
Climate data for Natonin, Mountain Province
Month	Jan	Feb	Mar	Apr	May	Jun	Jul	Aug	Sep	Oct	Nov	Dec	Year
Mean daily maximum °C (°F)	20 (68)	21 (70)	23 (73)	26 (79)	26 (79)	26 (79)	25 (77)	25 (77)	24 (75)	23 (73)	22 (72)	20 (68)	23 (74)
Mean daily minimum °C (°F)	14 (57)	15 (59)	16 (61)	17 (63)	18 (64)	18 (64)	18 (64)	18 (64)	18 (64)	18 (64)	17 (63)	16 (61)	17 (62)
Average precipitation mm (inches)	103 (4.1)	73 (2.9)	49 (1.9)	38 (1.5)	141 (5.6)	144 (5.7)	172 (6.8)	181 (7.1)	155 (6.1)	148 (5.8)	147 (5.8)	208 (8.2)	1,559 (61.5)
Average rainy days	17.1	12.8	11.0	9.6	18.9	21.5	23.5	24.5	21.7	16.1	17.1	20.5	214.3
Source: Meteoblue (modeled/calculated data, not measured locally)

== Demographics ==
Population census of Natonin

Year	Pop.	±% p.a.
1918	5,118	—
1939	5,999	+0.76%
1948	5,847	−0.28%
1960	9,397	+4.03%
1970	5,690	−4.89%

Year	Pop.	±% p.a.
1975	6,691	+3.30%
1980	7,325	+1.83%
1990	9,813	+2.97%
1995	8,997	−1.61%
2000	9,065	+0.16%

Year	Pop.	±% p.a.
2007	9,431	+0.55%
2010	10,048	+2.33%
2015	10,272	+0.42%
2020	10,339	+0.14%
2024	8,906	−3.52%

Source: Philippine Statistics Authority

In the 2024 census, the population of Natonin was 8,906 people, with a density of 35 inhabitants per square kilometer or 91 inhabitants per square mile.

The locals of Natonin are generally called iNatonin. By ethnolinguistics, the majority of the locals belong to the tribe Balangaos, or Iferangao, and speak the Finerangao language. There are three indigenous ethnic group with ancestral domains in Natonin: Balangao, Majukayong Kalinga, and eKachakran.

=== Balangao ===
The Balangaw people have two sub-tribes

- Hakki, who inhabit the western part of the municipality, namely the barangays of Tonglayan and Alunogan (including Pudo)
- Balangao, who inhabit most of central barangays of Natonin, namely: Balangao, Botac, Santa Isabel and Banawel.

=== Majukayong Kalinga ===
A part of the Kalinga tribe group, their ancestral domains are in the barangays of Maducayan and Saliok. The iMajukayongs are closely related to the Tanudan tribes of Tanudan, Kalinga, and speak the iMajukayong dialect which has similarities to the dialects of the iKalingas.

=== Ekachakran ===
The homeland of the eKachakrans are in the Kadaclan barangays of Barlig: Chupac, Lunas, Kaleo, Ogo-og and Barangay Banao of Natonin.

The three, while distinct in language and ethnicity, share some similarities in culture, either through borrowing or influence between the two. Populations of the town are of Igorot lineage. Headhunting was practiced throughout Natonin as late as the mid-1930s, but was set aside in favor of Christianity and education after World War II.

=== Languages ===
Natonin is home to two indigenous languages which have existed there since before the arrival of the Spanish: the Balangaw language, the Kachakran dialect of Finallig, and the Majukayong language. Because of the use of Ilocano for inter-tribal communication with other Igorot groups and as a lingua franca in Northern Luzon, the Balangaos can speak Ilocano.

== Economy ==
Poverty incidence of Natonin (%)

Source: Philippine Statistics Authority

The primary crop is rice, although limited arable space, mechanization and innovative agriculture renders the harvest to a subsistence level only. Backyard piggery mostly produce the pork supply. Vegetable gardening, fruit tree growing and tilapia raising are also starting to see commercial viability. Whatever is of shortage or lacking are imported outside the municipality. Few local handicrafts are promoted and are only made to order.

== Government ==
=== Local government ===
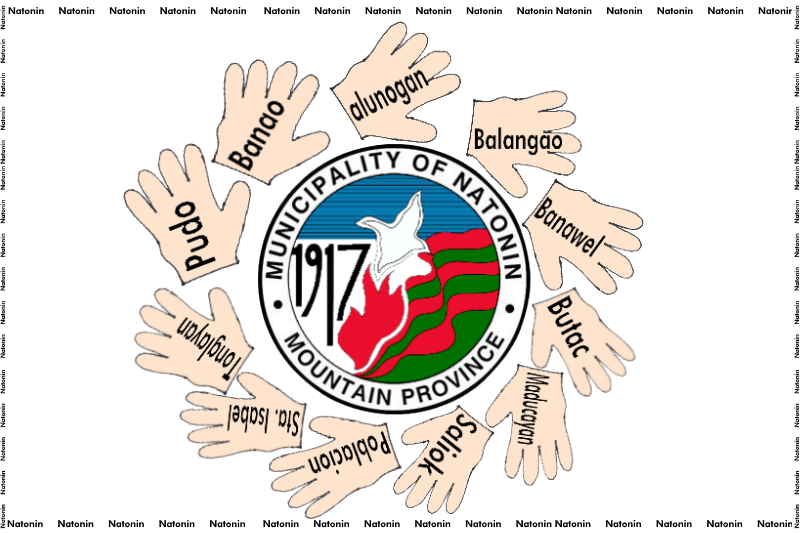
Former flag of Natonin

Natonin, belonging to the lone congressional district of the province of Mountain Province, is governed by a mayor designated as its local chief executive and by a municipal council as its legislative body in accordance with the Local Government Code. The mayor, vice mayor, and the councilors are elected directly by the people through an election which is being held every three years.

=== Elected officials ===
Members of the Municipal Council (2025–2028)
Position	Name
Congressman	Maximo Y. Dalog Jr.
Mayor	Jose T. Agagon
Vice-Mayor	Raymundo L. Lapasen
Councilors	Christopher M. Bayowan
Councilors	Perry A. Liwanen
Councilors	John M. Gammonac
Councilors	Barris C. Timmangao
Councilors	Sunshine L. Canao
Councilors	Fernando S. Magranga Jr.
Councilors	Jonathan A. Gumatay
Councilors	Bonbon L. Bacwadang

== Transportation ==
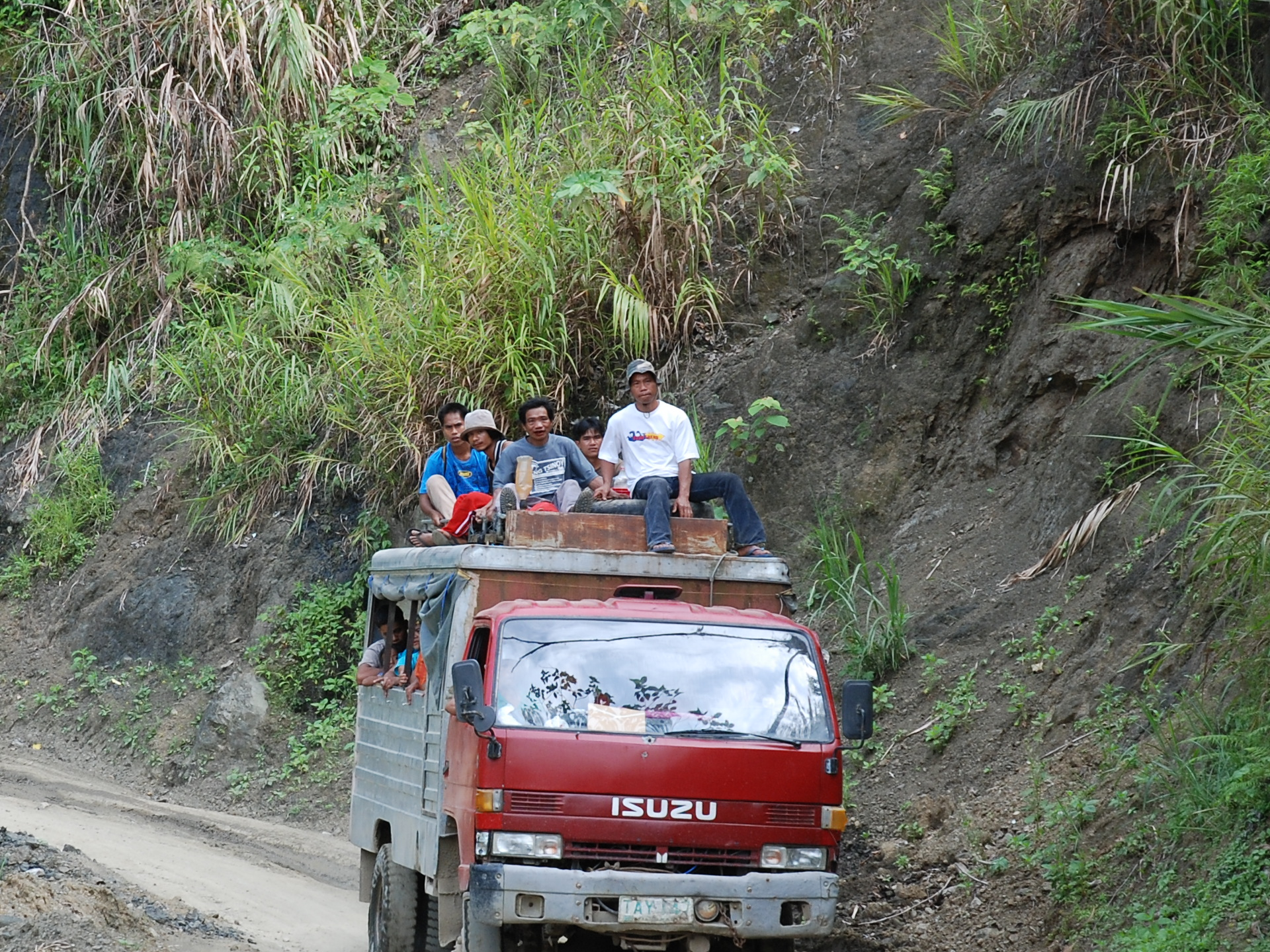
A truck traveling along the Natonin-Paracelis Road.

Since the widening of the national highways started in 2010, the Paracelis-Natonin Road is paved now. Although, some parts are either eroded or slipping away, and during rainy seasons landslides can render the roads impassable. Public utility or for-hire vans are the easiest transportation either to and from the municipality (e.g. Baguio and Manila).

== Tourism ==
Though it's not yet that improved, Natonin has the following sites:

- The Legendary Silent Mountain of Finaratan, located in Barangay Maducayan.
- The Apatan Rice Terraces
- The Balococ Waterfall
- The Naropaan Waterfall
- Tonglayan Rice Terraces
- Lagan River in Balangao
- Penadna Waterfalls
- Lettalet Waterfalls
- Fuyoun Spring in Siffu River located in Brgy. Saliok
- Elephant Head located in Banao

== Education ==
The Natonin Schools District Office governs all educational institutions within the municipality. It oversees the management and operations of all private and public, from primary to secondary schools.

=== Primary and elementary schools ===
- Apapawan Elementary School
- Banawel Elementary School
- Butac Elementary School
- Layog-Ogtong Elementary School
- Maducayan Elementary School
- Nabhar Primary School
- Natonin Central School
- Pangtor Primary School
- Purag Primary School
- Puya-ao Elementary School
- Saliok Elementary School
- Sta. Isabel Elementary School
- Tappo Elementary School
- Tonglayan Elementary School

=== Secondary schools ===
- Banawel National High School
- Immaculate Heart High School
- Natonin National High School
- Natonin Senior High School
- Saliok National High School
- Sta. Isabel National High School
