= Bontoc =

Bontoc may refer to:

- Bontoc, Mountain Province, Philippines
- Bontoc, Southern Leyte, Philippines
- Bontoc people, an ethnic group from Central Luzon, Philippines
- Bontoc language, spoken by the Bontoc people
