= Pasiking =

Indigenous basket-backpack in the Philippines

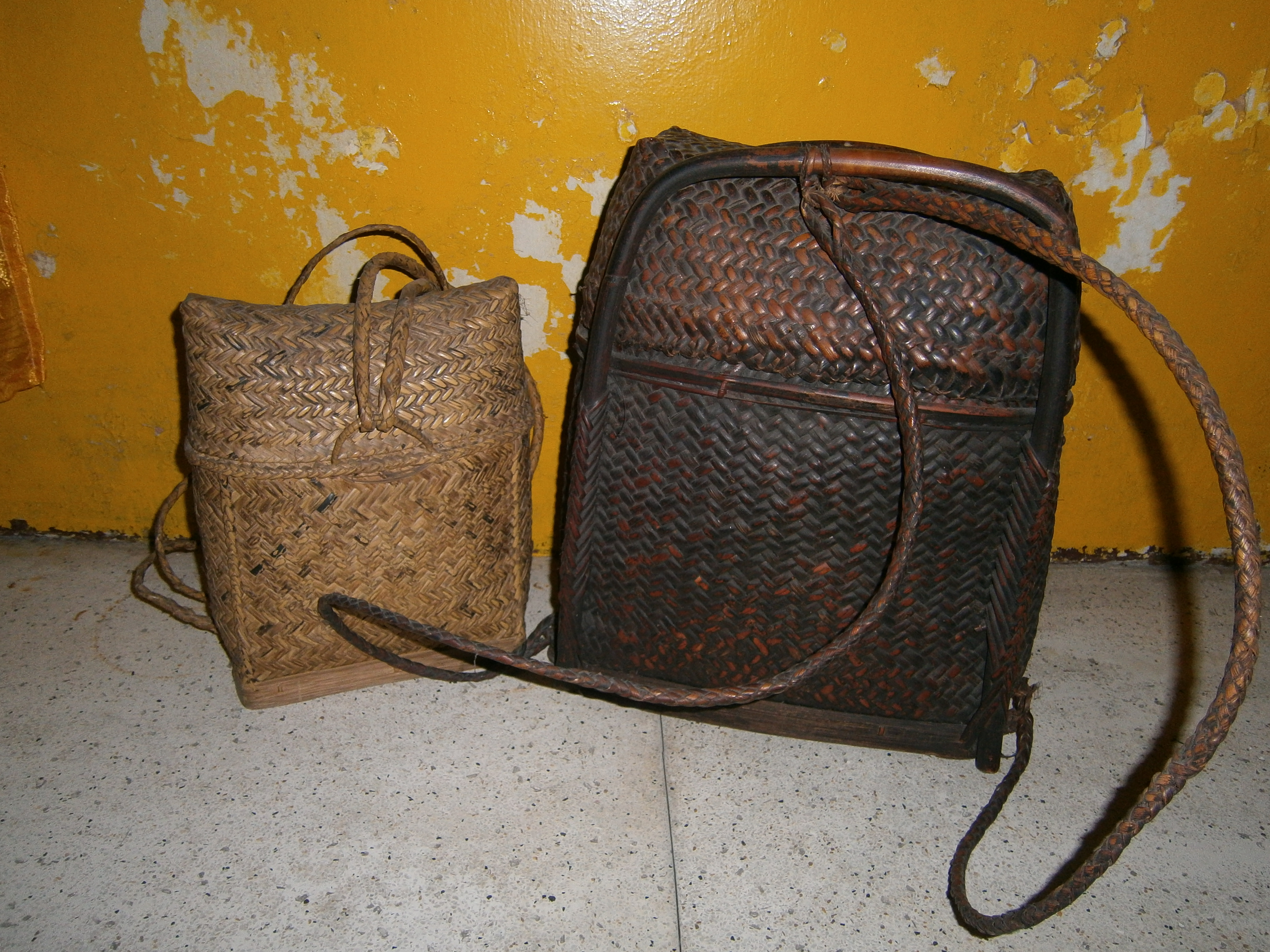
Pasikings are made in various sizes and finished with either a natural or dark color.

The pasiking (English term: knapbasket) is the indigenous basket-backpack found among the various ethno-linguistic groups of Northern Luzon in the Philippines. These artifacts, whether handwoven traditionally or their 21st century contemporary variations, are considered exemplars of functional basketry in the Philippines and among Filipinos.

The sacred, ritual pasiking of the Ifugao tribal group is called the inabnutan, not to be confused with the more common bangeo. Both of those types have abnut palm bast and/or apangdan vine weatherproofing. The bangaw has a rigid, fixed flap over the shoulders, while the inabnutan has a flexible woven flap.

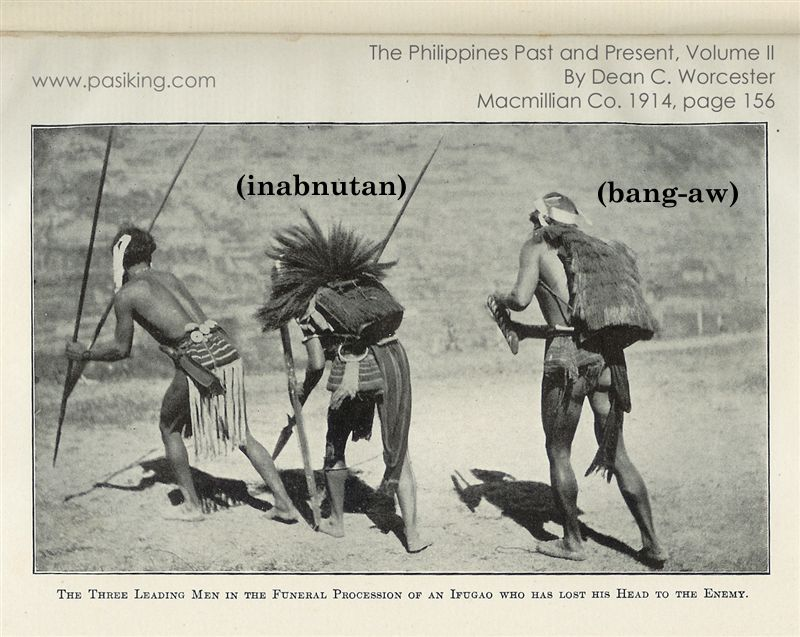
Inabnutan and bangaw difference in construction

Another sacred, ritual pasiking of the Highland Philippine Bontoc and Kankanaey peoples is called the takba. Representing an ancestor figure, the takba is an active participant in begnas rituals. These takba must be fed or its contents recharged periodically. To neglect or disrespect a takba is to risk punishment of becoming "bagtit" or demented.

Some of the Northern Philippine tribal groups called Igorots or Cordillerans that weave pasiking are the Apayaos or Isneg, the Tinguian of Abra province, the Kalingas of Kalinga province, the Gaddang, the Bugkalot, the Applai, the Bontocs of Bontoc, Mountain Province, the Ilagod, the Bago, the Kankana-ey, the Balangao, the Ibaloi, the Ifugaos, the Ikalahan, the Kalanguya, the Karao, and the Ilongots. It is also woven using rattan by non-Cordilleran persons.

The most common materials used in construction are rattan and bamboo. There are also rare pasiking specimens utilizing deer hide (parfleche) and wood. There are at least two specimens utilizing a whole turtle shell (one is in the Museo ng Kaalamáng Katutubò collection in Manila,) and at least one documented sample in crocodile skin (in the George Schenk collection in Banaue.)

A deconstructed version of the pasiking, including dozens of antique, vintage and contemporary variants, were exhibited in the BenCab Museum. There are also 21st century pasiking that are made of recyclable materials like plastic cargo straps, canvas conveyor belts, and recycled detonation cord.

An exhibit at Museo Kordilyera at University of the Philippines Baguio from December to January 2022 showcased several varieties of these traditional backpacks.

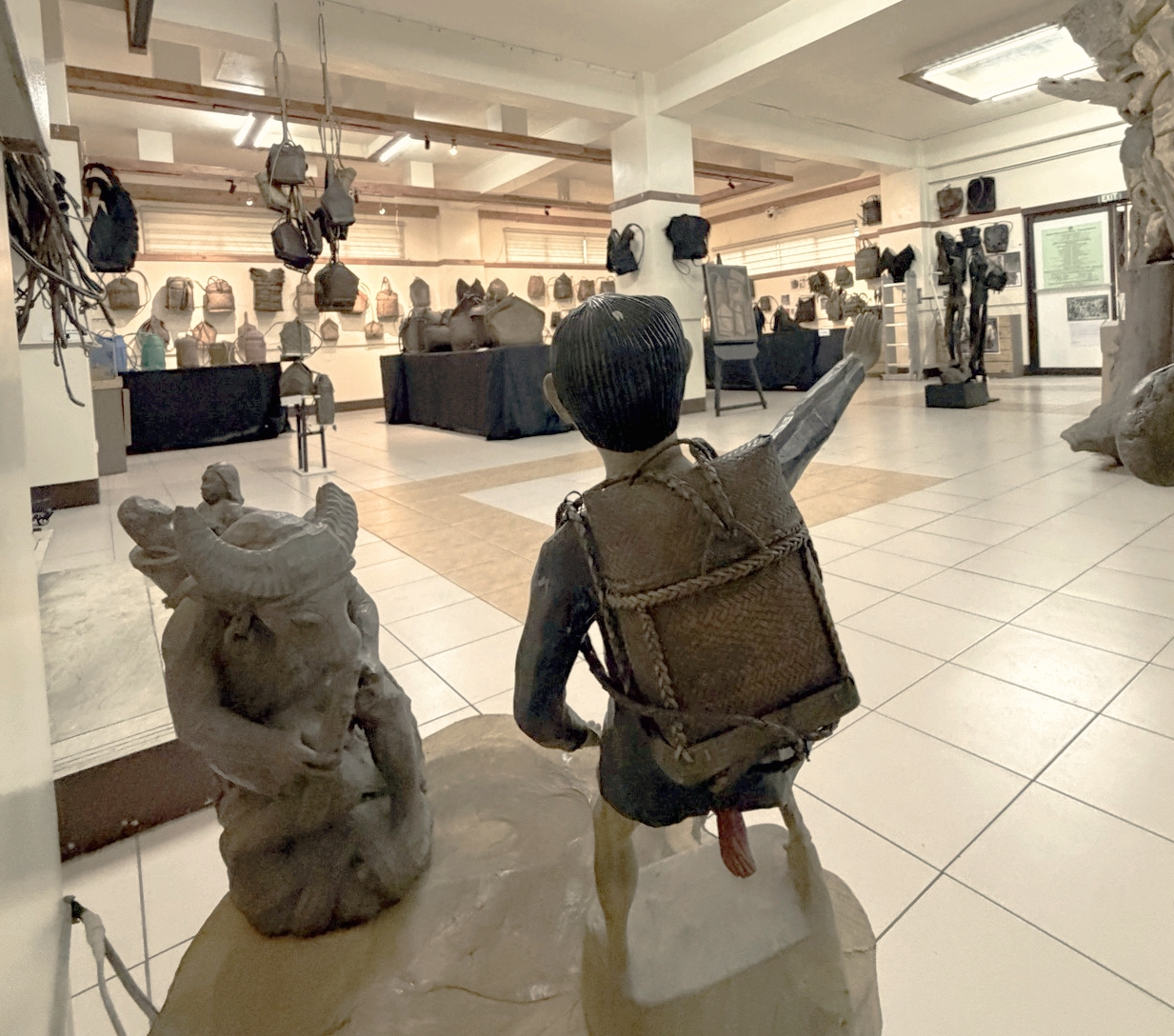

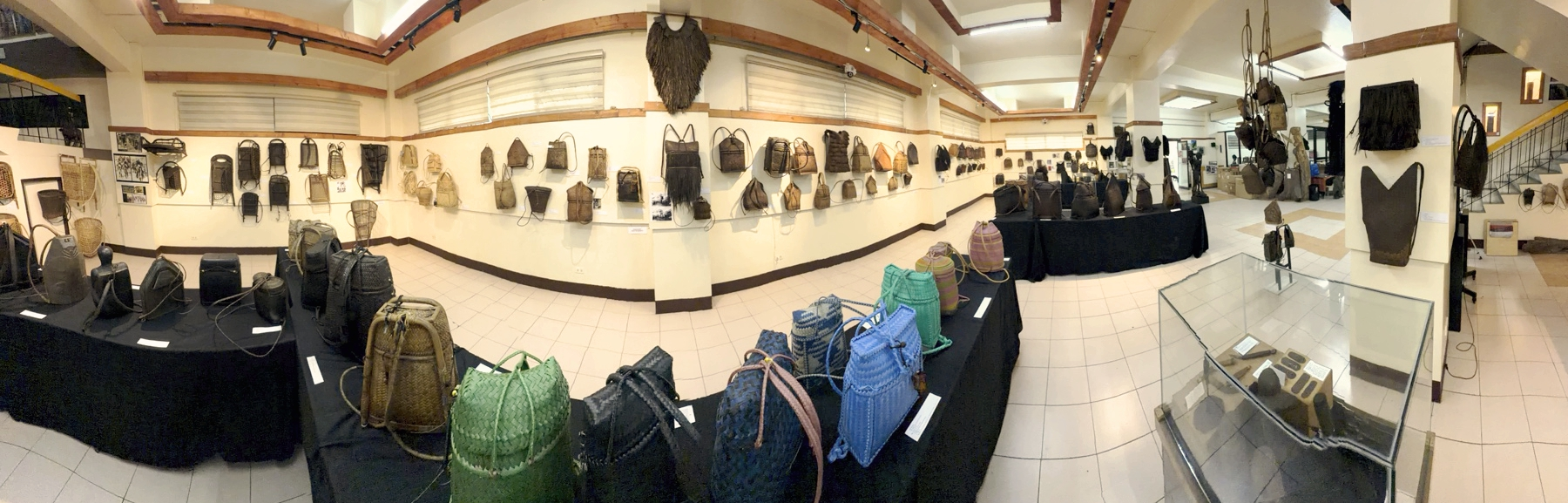
Baguio Museum 2025 pasiking exhibit

A recent exhibit at the Baguio Museum, Carriers of Tradition III; featured what was only the second time that a comprehensive assemblage of this particular type basketry occurred in the Philippines, with over one hundred seventy (170) old, rare and atypical specimens on display from the collection of Armand Voltaire and Maricel Cating, with curated pasiking loans from weavers, devotees and enthusiasts. A selection of chagi pack frame load carriers were also exhibited for the first time.

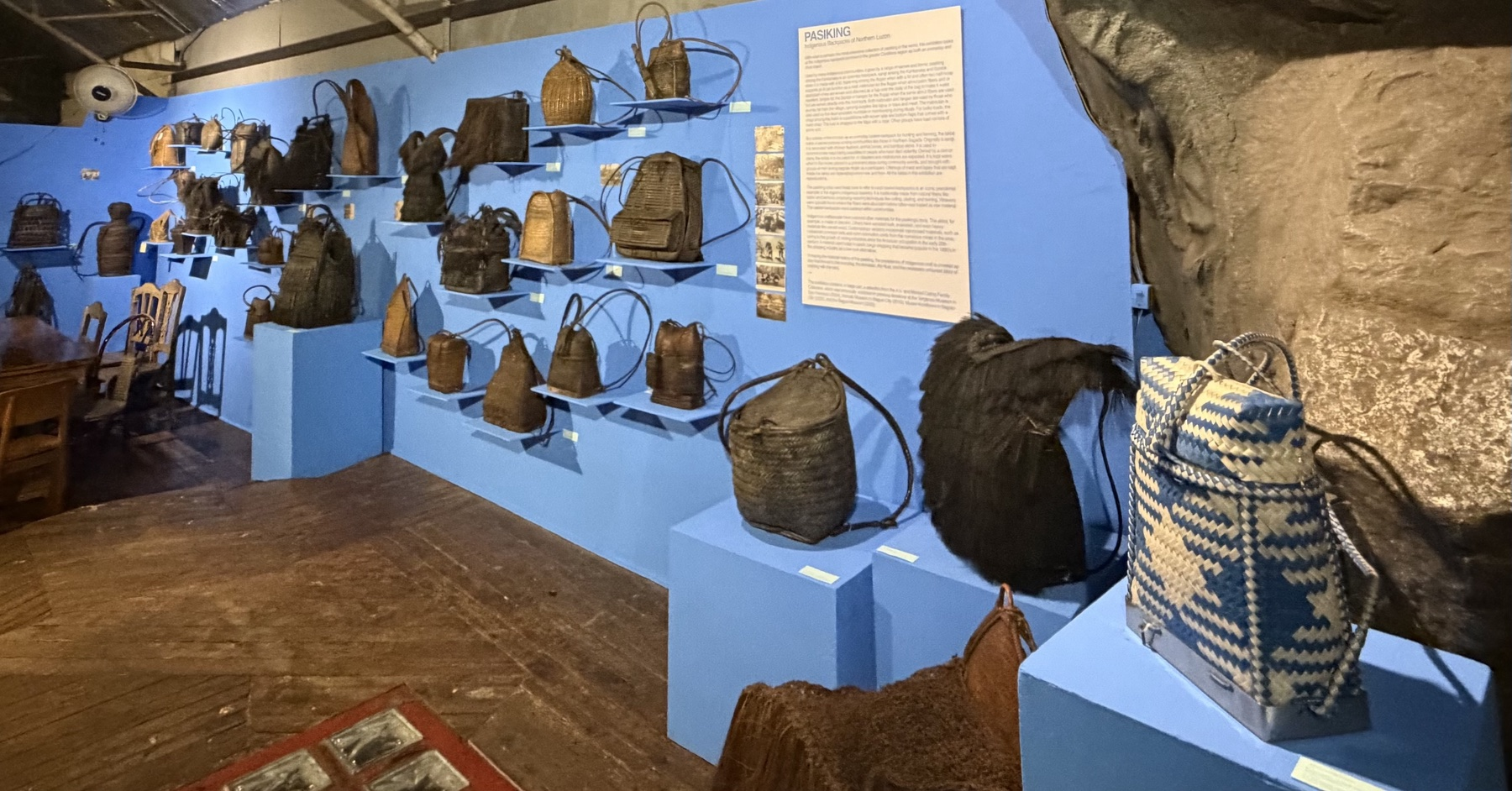
2026 pasiking Exhibit at VOCAS, Baguio City

The most recent comprehensive pasiking exhibit occurred at VOCAS (Victor Oyteza Community Art Space) at the La Azotea Building in Baguio City. Curated by Rocky Cajigan, over 140 pasiking were exhibited, several of which were new and vintage pasiking following traditional designs, but made of modern, 21st century, non-traditional materials. VOCAS itself is repository to at least 10 pasiking specimens.

In the 1970s on through the 1980s, the pasiking has also been a symbol among Filipino students for nationalist activism. There was a decline of making traditional bamboo crafts, including the pasiking, during the 1980s but in the mid-2010s, the industry of bamboo crafts came into resurgence with the help of the Philippines' Department of Trade and Industry.

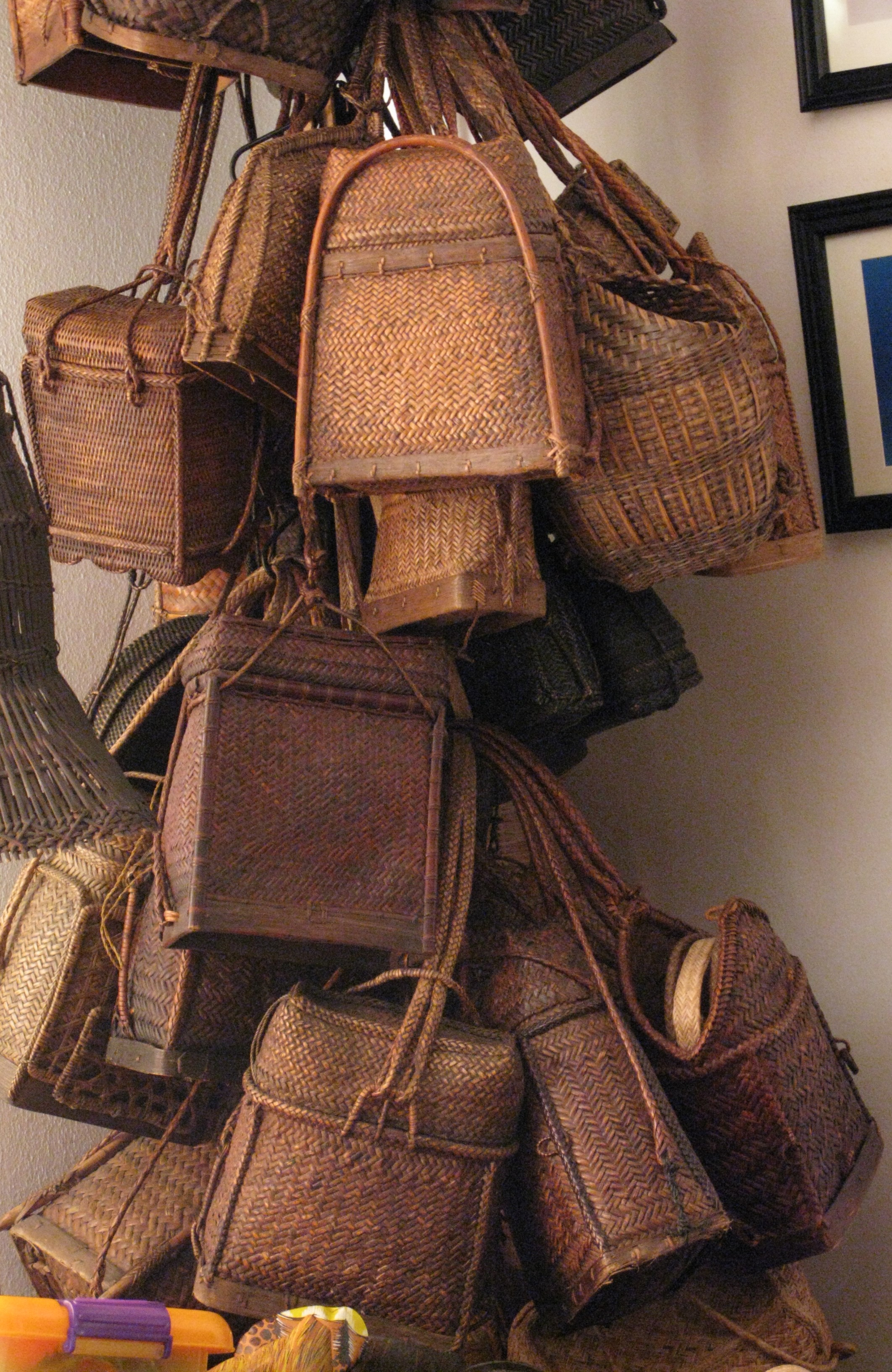
Pasiking in various styles

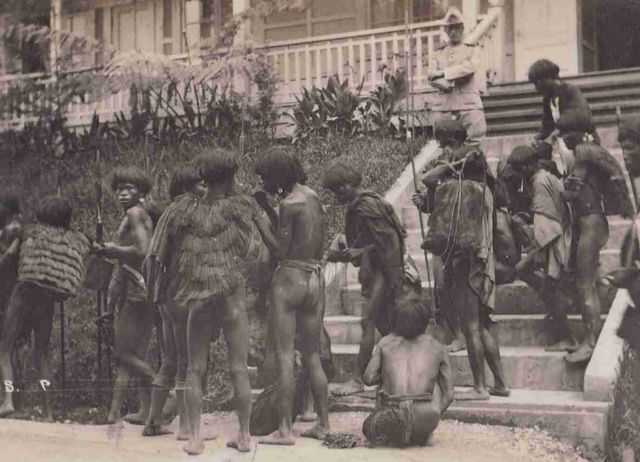
Ifugao pasiking during the early American period in Camp John Hay, Baguio City

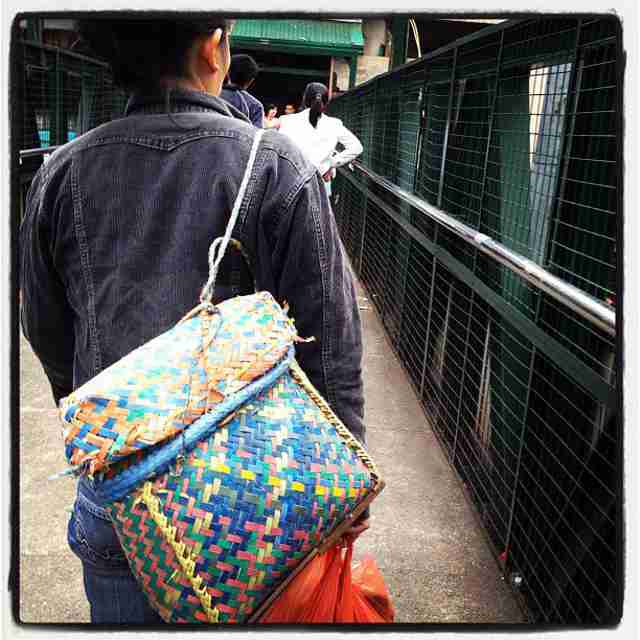
Contemporary 21st-century pasiking using recycled plastic polypropylene cargo straps

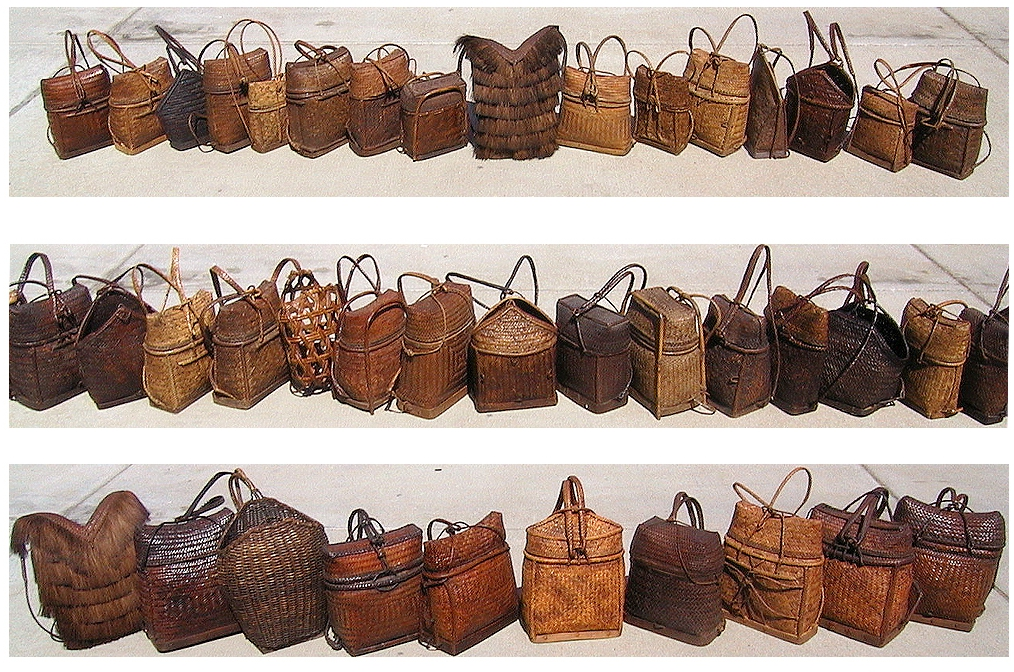
Pasiking specimens; photographed in Pt. Richmond, CA, in 2004

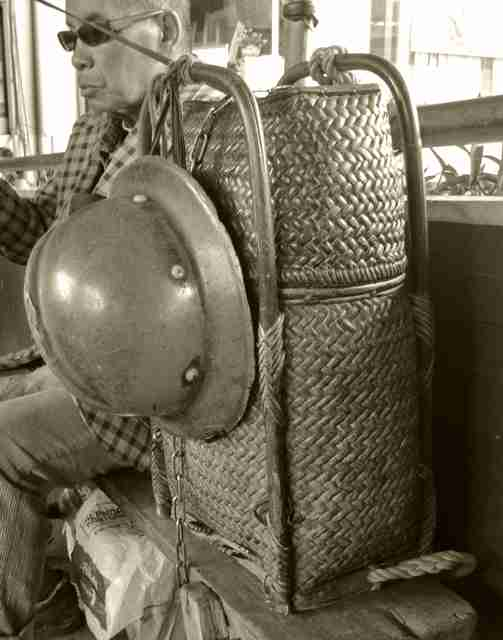
Ifugao hape'eng backpack
