= Southwestern Bontoc =

Bontoc variety of the Philippines

Southwestern Bontok
- Southwestern Bontoc
- Native to: Philippines
- Region: Cordillera Administrative Region
- Native speakers: 2,470 (2007 census)
- Language family: Malayo-Polynesian: Philippine; North Luzon; Meso-Cordilleran; South-Central Cordilleran; Central Cordilleran; North Central Cordilleran; Nuclear Cordilleran; Bontok-Kankanay; Bontok; Southwestern Bontok

Language codes
- ISO 639-3: vbk

Southwestern Bontoc (Southwestern Bontok) is a variety of the Bontoc language of the Philippines. This language is a moribund language, with only 2,470 speakers left in 2007.

== Distribution and dialects ==
Ethnologue reports the following locations for Southwestern Bontok:

Cordillera Administrative Region: Mountain Province: Bontoc Municipality: Alab, Balili, Gonogon and some villages near Chico River Valley and the southwest of Bontoc Municipality.

Ethnologue identifies Ina-ab, Binalili and Ginonogon as dialects of Southwestern Bontok.

== Similarities ==
Ethnologue reports the language is similar to 4 other Bontoc languages: Central Bontok, North Bontok, Southern Bontok and Eastern Bontok.

== Death of the language ==
This language is a moribund language, which means that only a few people speak it and if the speakers of the language continue to speak Tagalog or English to their sons and not speak their own mother tongue, the language will not be passed down to newer generations, eventually becoming a "dead language". Many of the speakers have shifted to Ilokano. Many of the speakers can also speak Central Bontok and Kankanaey as their second language.

== See also ==
- Bontoc language
- Philippine languages
- Mountain Province
