= Central Bontok language =

Bontoc language of the Philippines

Central Bontok
- Central Bontoc
- Bontoc, Bontoc Igorot, Kali
- Native to: Philippines
- Region: Cordillera Administrative Region
- Native speakers: 20,000 (2007 census)
- Language family: Malayo-Polynesian: Northern Luzon; Meso-Cordilleran; South-Central Cordilleran; Central Cordilleran; North-Central Cordilleran; Nuclear Cordilleran; Bontok-Kankanay; Bontok; Central Bontok

Language codes
- ISO 639-3: lbk
- Glottolog: cent2292

Central Bontok (or Kali) is a language of the Bontoc group from the Philippines. The 2007 census claimed there were 19,600 speakers.

== Distribution ==
Ethnologue reports the following locations for Central Bontok:

Cordillera Administrative Region: Mountain Province: Bontoc municipality, Bontoc ili, Caluttit, Dalican, Guina-ang, Ma-init, Maligcong, Samoki, and Tocucan villages.

== Dialects ==
Ethnologue reports 5 dialects for Central Bontok: Khinina-ang, Finontok, Sinamoki, Jinallik, Minaligkhong and Tinokukan.

== Similarities ==
Ethnologue reports that the language is similar to other Bontoc languages, These languages are: North Bontok, Southwest Bontok, South Bontok, and East Bontok.

== Phonology ==
=== Consonants ===
The Guinaang dialect of Central Bontok has the following inventory of consonant phonemes:

		Labial	Alveolar	Palatal	Velar	Glottal
Plosive	plain voiceless	p	t		k	ʔ
Plosive	aspirated voiceless				kʰ	
Plosive	voiced	b	d		ɡ	
Affricate			ts			
Fricative		f	s			h
Nasal		m	n		ŋ	
Approximant			l	j	w	
Rhotic			ɾ			

Originally (as documented in the mid 20th century), the sounds pairs [b ~ f], [d ~ ts], [g ~ kʰ], [l ~ ɾ] were in complementary distribution and thus allophones of the phonemes /b/, /d/, /g/, and /l/, respectively (e.g. [ˈtsaɾa] for /ˈdala/ "blood"). With the introduction of loanwords from English, Ilokano and Tagalog, these contrasts have become phonemicized. The phoneme /h/ was also introduced in modern loanwords.

== See also ==
- Philippine languages
