= Eastern Bontok language =

Bontok language of the Philippines

Eastern Bontok
- Eastern Bontoc
- Native speakers: 6,200 (2007 census)
- Language family: Austronesian: Malayo-Polynesian; Northern Luzon; Meso-Cordilleran; South-Central Cordilleran; North Central Cordilleran; Nuclear Cordilleran; Bontok-Kankanay; Bontok; Eastern Bontok

Language codes
- ISO 639-3: ebk
- Glottolog: east2881

Eastern Bontok (Filipino: Finallíg, Kenachakrán, Liniyás) is a language of the Bontok group spoken in the Philippines. The 2007 census claimed there were around 6,200 speakers.

== Distribution ==
According to Ethnologue, Eastern Bontok is spoken in the following areas: Cordillera Administrative Region: East mountain province: Barlig Municipality: Barlig, Kadaklan, and Lias villages.

== Dialects ==
Ethnologue reports 3 dialects for Eastern Bontok: Finallig, Kinajakran (Kenachakran) and Liniyas. Komisyon sa Wikang Filipino recognizes them as separate languages.

== Similarities ==
The language was reported to be similar with 4 other Bontok languages: Northern Bontok, Central Bontok, Southwestern Bontok and Southern Bontok.

== See also ==
- Cordillera Administrative Region
- Bontoc language
- Bontoc people
