= Paracelis =

Municipality in Mountain Province, Philippines

- Municipality
- Municipality of Paracelis
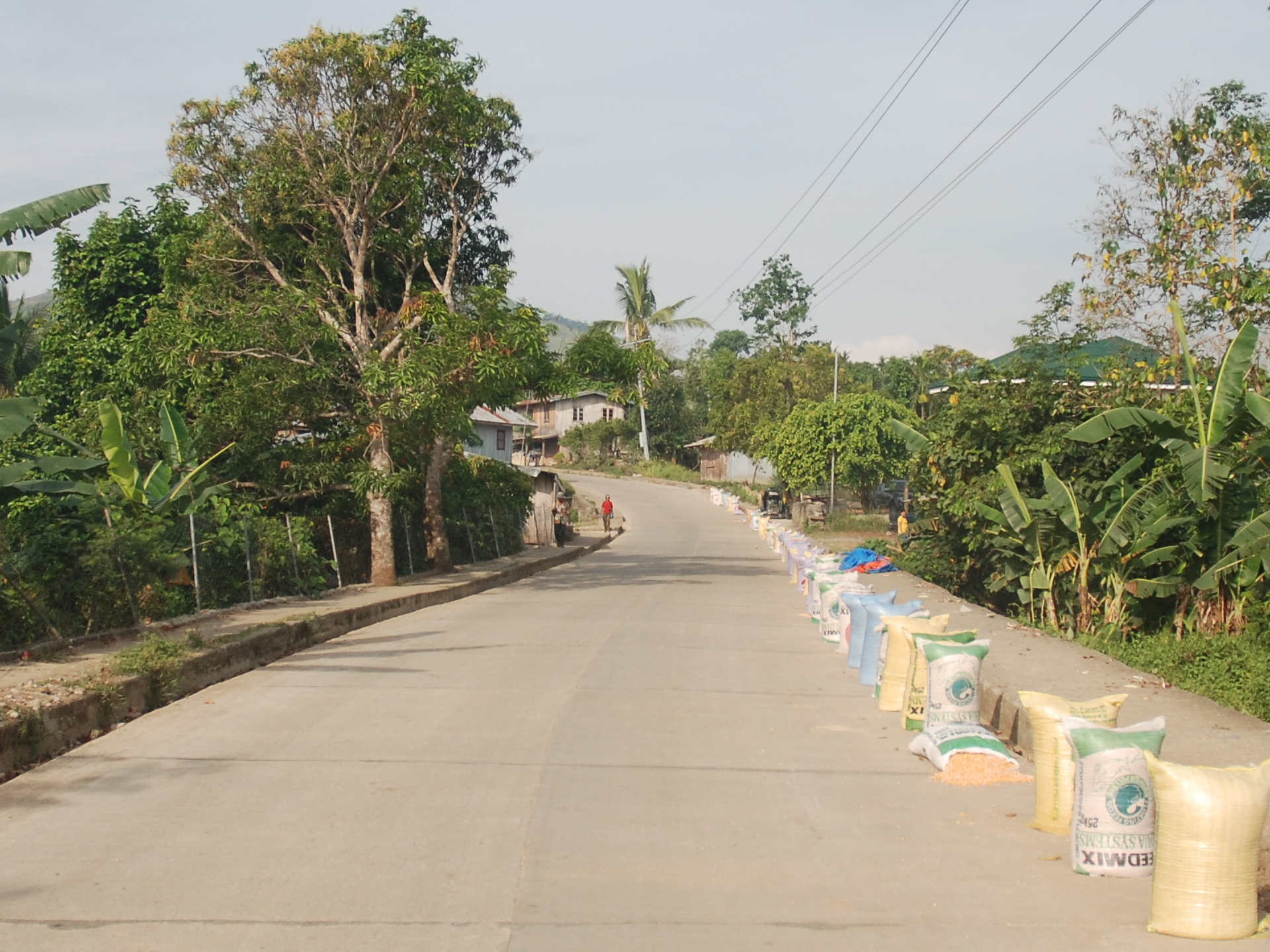

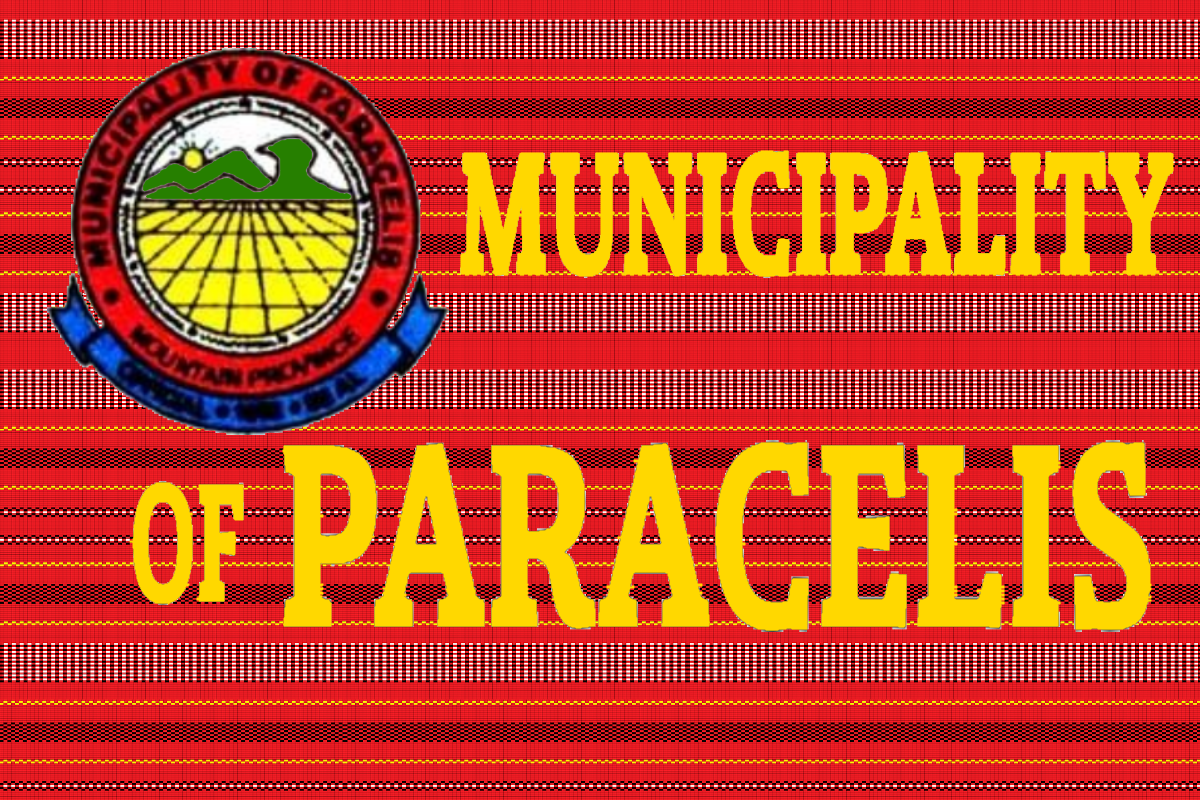
- Flag

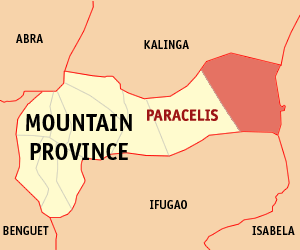
- Map of Mountain Province with Paracelis highlighted
- Interactive map of Paracelis
- Location within the Philippines
- Coordinates: 17°10′52″N 121°24′13″E
- Country: Philippines
- Region: Cordillera Administrative Region
- Province: Mountain Province
- District: Lone district
- Founded: 1962
- Barangays: 9 (see Barangays)

Government
  - Type: Sangguniang Bayan
  - Mayor: Marcos G. Ayangwa
  - Vice Mayor: Lister M. Carlos
  - Representative: Maximo Y. Dalog Jr.
  - Municipal Council: Members: Ruben T. Vicente; Lito B. Basungit; Marcelo T. Ambatali; Victorino S. Bannaue; John B. Banggolay; Ateneo B. Gusimat; Gaston G. Todco; Marciano O. Lappao Jr.
  - Electorate: 22,269 voters (2025)

Area
  - Total: 570.16 km^{2} (220.14 sq mi)
- Elevation: 324 m (1,063 ft)
- Highest elevation: 989 m (3,245 ft)
- Lowest elevation: 159 m (522 ft)

Population (2024 census)
  - Total: 30,143
  - Density: 52.868/km^{2} (136.93/sq mi)
  - Households: 7,159

Economy
  - Income class: 1st municipal income class
  - Poverty incidence: 27.42% (2023)
  - Revenue: ₱ 293.3 million (2024)
  - Assets: ₱ 760.5 million (2024)
  - Expenditure: ₱ 289.8 million (2024)
  - Liabilities: ₱ 437.4 million (2024)

Service provider
  - Electricity: Mountain Province Electric Cooperative (MOPRECO)
- Time zone: UTC+8 (PST)
- ZIP code: 2625
- PSGC: 1404406000
- IDD : area code: +63 (0)74
- Native languages: Ga'dang; Balangao; Bontoc; Ilocano; Tagalog
- Website: www.paracelis.gov.ph

Paracelis, officially the Municipality of Paracelis is a municipality in the province of Mountain Province, Philippines. According to the 2024 census, it has a population of 30,143 people.

The town's population distribution is 37 percent urban and 63 percent rural. Urban settlement is on the west side of the town, a basin of low-level hilly-to-flat lands surrounded by mountains.

== History ==
Paracelis was first settled by the Ga'dang (Gaddang) ethnic group, who were migrants from Cagayan Valley. Through the years, Paracelis has become the main entry point to the rest of Mountain Province.

The name Paracelis came into existence as early as the 1900s as part of the territorial barangays of Natonin within the District of Kalao. Paracelis became a regular town named Paracales with the enactment of Republic Act 3488 on June 16, 1962. The town was renamed Paracelis on June 18, 1966 under Republic Act 4738. The first appointed mayor was Benito Rafael.

The first official site of the civil government was at Natta'longan, now currently within Barangay Bantay. The pre-World War II government was short-lived and administration lasted under three local managements from 1917 to 1921.

In 1962, the government center at Natta'longan was transferred to Anangka within the Rafael compound. The site was again transferred to a lot in Marat donated by the Gawwan family. In 1991, the officials of the municipal government transferred the government center to its current site in Poblacion. The government used to occupy a one-hectare lot that housed all the units.

On December 25, 2007, the town's mayor, Cesar Rafael, was killed in an ambush in sitio Sinigpit, Barangay Butigue.

Paracelis is currently a melting pot of migrants from different areas, such as the Gaddang, Balangao, Majukayong, Kalinga, and Ifugao tribes, including Ilokanos. This migration has been instrumental on the fast rising urbanization of Paracelis in the last two decades. The town's current administration is introducing an urbanization plan for the municipality.

== Geography ==
The Municipality of Paracelis is a border town of Mountain Province where it shares borders with Kalinga, Isabela and Ifugao provinces. In the north, its borders with the city of Tabuk and the town of Tanudan. In the south, it is bordered by Alfonso Lista. In the north-east, it shares a border with Quezon, in the east with Mallig and Roxas in Isabela. In the west, it borders with Natonin.

Due to hilly terrain, Paracelis has numerous zigzag roads in most parts, including access roads that connect the municipality to other border towns. On both sides of its zigzag roads, travelers can view the vast cornfield plantations alongside.

Paracelis is situated 98.75 kilometres (61.36 mi) from the provincial capital Bontoc, and 430.33 kilometres (267.39 mi) from the country's capital city of Manila.

=== Barangays ===
Paracelis is politically subdivided into 9 barangays. Each barangay consists of puroks and some have sitios.

- Anonat
- Bacarri
- Bananao
- Bantay
- Bunot
- Buringal
- Butigue
- Palitod
- Poblacion

=== Climate ===
Climate data for Paracelis, Mountain Province
Month	Jan	Feb	Mar	Apr	May	Jun	Jul	Aug	Sep	Oct	Nov	Dec	Year
Mean daily maximum °C (°F)	25 (77)	26 (79)	28 (82)	31 (88)	31 (88)	31 (88)	30 (86)	29 (84)	29 (84)	28 (82)	27 (81)	25 (77)	28 (83)
Mean daily minimum °C (°F)	20 (68)	20 (68)	21 (70)	22 (72)	24 (75)	24 (75)	24 (75)	24 (75)	23 (73)	23 (73)	22 (72)	21 (70)	22 (72)
Average precipitation mm (inches)	78 (3.1)	60 (2.4)	49 (1.9)	51 (2.0)	194 (7.6)	197 (7.8)	209 (8.2)	226 (8.9)	185 (7.3)	180 (7.1)	143 (5.6)	183 (7.2)	1,755 (69.1)
Average rainy days	15.6	12.5	11.8	12.5	21.0	23.3	25.2	26.1	22.6	17.1	16.7	19.6	224
Source: Meteoblue (modeled/calculated data, not measured locally)

== Demographics ==
Population census of Paracelis

Year	Pop.	±% p.a.
1970	5,666	—
1975	7,679	+6.29%
1980	9,729	+4.84%
1990	13,027	+2.96%

Year	Pop.	±% p.a.
1995	15,882	+3.78%
2000	18,985	+3.90%
2007	24,705	+3.70%
2010	26,476	+2.55%

Year	Pop.	±% p.a.
2015	28,121	+1.15%
2020	31,168	+2.19%
2024	30,143	−0.80%

Source: Philippine Statistics Authority

In the 2024 census, the population of Paracelis was 30,143 people, with a density of 53 inhabitants per square kilometer or 140 inhabitants per square mile.

=== Language ===
The town of Paracelis is home to three indigenous languages, the Balangaw language, the Ga'dang language (similar to the Ga'dang language used in Nueva Vizcaya, Isabela, and Aurora), and the Majukayong. Ilocano is the lingua franca of the municipality. The Balangaw is the native language of the Balangao people from Natonin, Mountain Province. It is spoken in some parts of Paracelis due to their settlements in the area in the early times as well as the history of Paracelis being a former barangay of the old Natonin under the American rule.

== Economy ==
Poverty incidence of Paracelis (%)

Source: Philippine Statistics Authority

The municipality of Paracelis depends on agriculture as its main engine of growth with corn as the main product, and bananas coming second. Livestock farming is also a fast-rising business, and with the NGP and reforestation program of the DENR fruit tree growing is on the rise as is with vegetable growing. Trade activities include the commerce of basic consumer goods, handicrafts, food business, and others.

The municipal government is planning to pursue real estate development and tourism as its next engines of growth.

Its location at the crossroad makes Paracelis a future trading hub in the Eastern Cordillera Growth Corridor, a primary growth center of the Cordillera Administrative Region.

== Government ==
=== Local government ===
Paracelis, belonging to the lone congressional district of the province of Mountain Province, is governed by a mayor designated as its local chief executive and by a municipal council as its legislative body in accordance with the Local Government Code. The mayor, vice mayor, and the councilors are elected directly by the people through an election which is being held every three years.

=== Elected officials ===
Members of the Municipal Council (2025–2028)
Position	Name
Congressman	Maximo Y. Dalog Jr.
Mayor	Marcos G. Ayangwa
Vice-Mayor	Lister M. Carlos
Councilors	Ace Dave S. Bucok
Councilors	Rogelio M. Banggot
Councilors	John B. Banggolay
Councilors	Crispin S. Calunnag
Councilors	Elsie G. Oyam
Councilors	Sabas M. Gayadon
Councilors	John F. Bautista
Councilors	Gaston G. Todco

== Transportation ==
The only mode of transportation to and from Paracelis are buses and jeepneys plying to Santiago, Baguio, Tabuk, Alfonso Lista and Natonin. Going south, it takes approximately 1.5 hours to reach Alfonso Lista and 3 hours to Santiago from Paracelis. Going north, it takes approximately 2 hours to reach Tabuk. Going west to Natonin town proper, it takes less than an hour. Currently, there is no road access from the town proper going to Mallig in the east but there is road from its border Barangay Buringal to Mallig.

As of 2017, there is concreting of the national highway from Butigue, Palitud, Anonat going to Roxas, Isabela

== Education ==
The Paracelis Schools District Office governs all educational institutions within the municipality. It oversees the management and operations of all private and public, from primary to secondary schools.

=== Primary and elementary schools ===
- Addang Elementary School
- Amolong Elementary School
- Anonat Elementary School
- Apalis Elementary School
- Bacarri Elementary School
- Bagabag Elementary School
- Balindan Elementary School
- Bananao Elementary School
- Burayoc Elementary School
- Butigue Alliance Learning Center
- Butigue Elementary School
- Cabuaan Elementary School
- Camparadi Elementary School
- Canabo Elementary School
- Cassag Elementary School
- Catao Elementary School
- Catubangan Primary School
- Dalanao Elementary School
- Damsite Elementary School
- Dannal Elementary School
- Gassilang Primary School
- Kabulalaan Elementary School
- Kalao Elementary School
- Labay Elementary School
- Maab-abnot Elementary School
- Makilo Elementary School
- Marallag Elementary School
- Minoli Elementary School
- Mulliang Elementary School
- Natta'longan Elementary School
- Pacak Elementary School
- Palitod Elementary School
- Paracelis Central School
- San Emilio Elementary School
- San Rafael Elementary School

=== Secondary schools ===
Eight out of nine barangays in Paracelis have their respective secondary institution. Annex campuses of major high schools in different barangays were converted into a regular and independent high schools. The list of secondary schools are as follows:

- Bacarri National Trade and Agricultural School - Barangay Bacarri
- Paracelis Technical and Vocational High School - Sitio Labay, Barangay Bantay
- Anonat National Agricultural and Vocation High School (Formerly Bacarri National Trade and Agricultural School- Anonat Annex) - Barangay Anonat
- Buringal National High School - Barangay Buringal
- Butigue National High School - Barangay Butigue
- Palitod National High School - Barangay Palitod
- San Rafael National High School - Sitio San Rafael, Barangay Bananao
- Paracelis National High School - Barangay Poblacion
- Bacarri National Trade and Agricultural School - Bunot Extension - Barangay Bunot

=== Higher educational institution ===
- Mountain Province State Polytechnic College

== Health ==
A district hospital serves the people of Paracelis. Recently, the municipal mayor, Avelino C. Amangyen signed a memorandum of agreement at the Japanese Embassy in Manila with the Japan International Cooperation Agency (JICA) representatives for the construction of the rural health unit building.
