= Bontoc language =

Northern Luzon language spoken in the Philippines

Bontoc
- Bontok
- Native to: Philippines
- Region: Mountain Province
- Native speakers: 41,000 (2007 census)
- Language family: Austronesian: Malayo-Polynesian; Philippine; Northern Luzon; Meso-Cordilleran; Central Cordilleran; Nuclear Cordilleran; Bontok–Kankanay; Bontoc

Language codes
- ISO 639-3: bnc – inclusive code Individual codes: lbk – Central Bontok ebk – Eastern Bontok rbk – Northern Bontok obk – Southern Bontok vbk – Southwestern Bontok
- Glottolog: bont1247
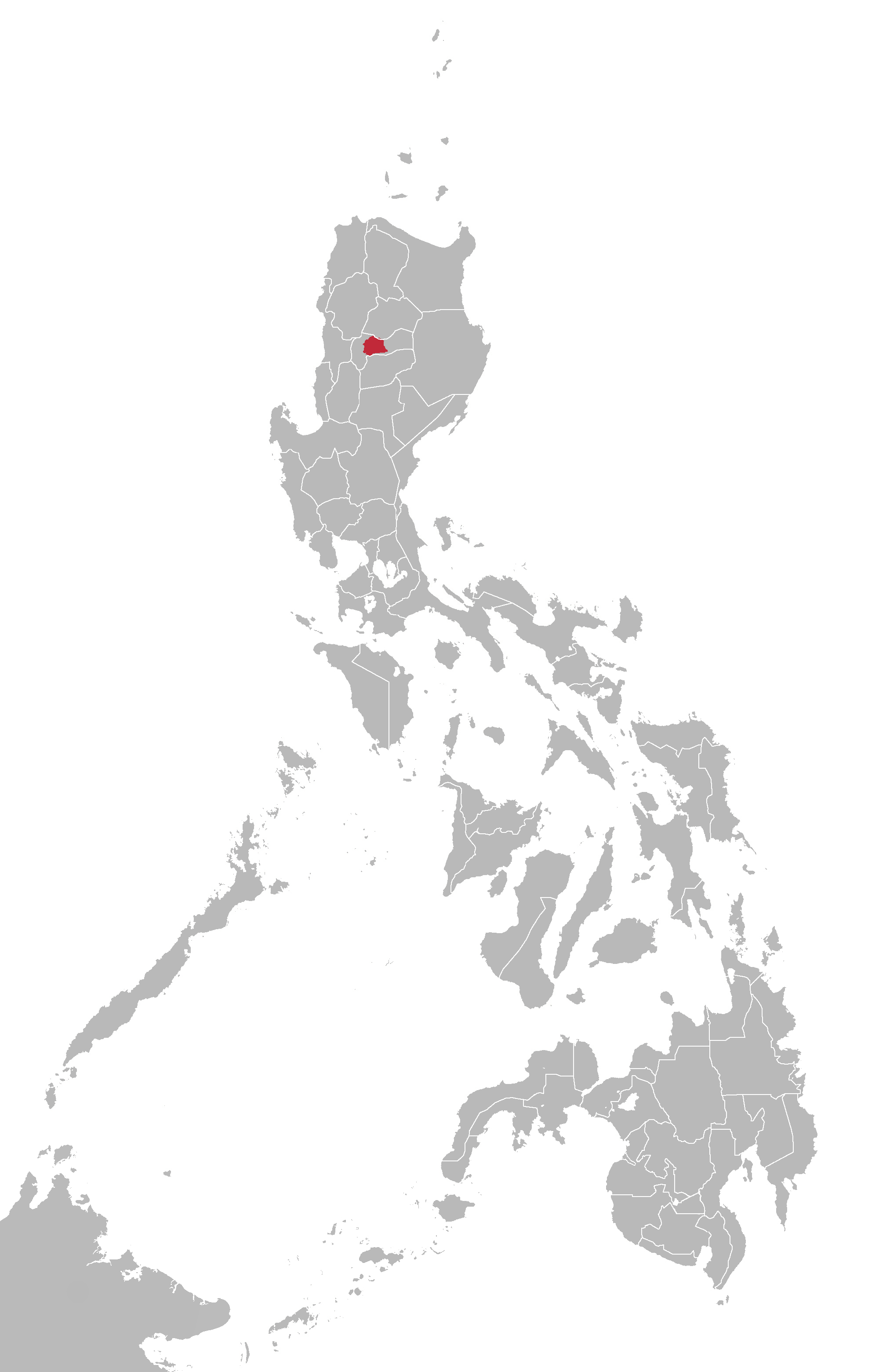
- Area where Bontoc is spoken according to Ethnologue

Bontoc (Bontok) /bɒnˈtɒk/ is a macrolanguage native to the indigenous Bontoc people of the Mountain Province, in the northern part of the Philippines.

== Specific languages ==
Ethnologue reports the following locations for each of the five Bontok languages. Speaker populations from the 2007 census, as quoted in Ethnologue.

Language	Location of speakers	Dialects	No. of speakers	Ref
Central Bontok (Filipino: Finontok)	Bontoc (Bontoc ili, Caluttit, Dalican, Guina-ang, Ma-init, Maligcong, Samoki, and Tocucan)	Khinina-ang; Finontok; Sinamoki; Jinallik; Minaligkhong; Tinokukan	19,600	
Eastern Bontok (Filipino: Finallig)	Barlig (Barlig, Kadaklan, Lias)	Finallig; Kinajakran (Kenachakran); Liniyas	6,170	
Northern Bontok (Filipino: Sinadanga)	Sadanga (Anabel, Bekigan, Belwang, Betwagan, Demang, Sacasacan, Saclit, and Sadanga Poblacion); Southern Kalinga		9,700	
Southern Bontok	Bontoc (Talubin, Bayyo, and Can-eo)	Tinoveng; Kanan-ew	2,760	
Southwestern Bontok	Bontoc (Alab, Balili, Gonogon, and villages in the Chico River valley, southwest of the municipal capital Bontoc, along Halsema Highway)	Ina-ab; Binalili; Ginonogon	2,470	

== Phonology ==
Consonant phonemes
	Labial	Alveolar	Palatal	Velar	Glottal
Nasal	m	n		ŋ	
Plosive	p b	t d		k ɡ	ʔ
Fricative		s			
Rhotic		ɻ~ɺ			
Approximant			j		

- The archiphoneme /r/ has [l], [ɻ], and [ɺ] as its allophones. The allophone [l] occurs word-initially, adjacent to /i/, as the second member of a consonant cluster consisting of a coronal consonant and /r/, and as the second member of any consonant cluster preceded by /i/. [ɻ] occurs in free variation with [l] word-initially, but otherwise occurs in complementary distribution with it. [ɺ] occurs in free variation with [l] and [ɻ] word-initially, and with [ɻ] elsewhere. These /r/ sounds are even applied to loanwords from Ilokano and Tagalog, and Spanish loanwords from the 2 languages.
- The plosives /t/, /ɡ/, /b/, and /d/ have, respectively, [t̪] (representing an interdental consonant), [kʰ], [f], and [t͡s] as their syllable-initial allophones.
- The voiced stop /b/ also has [b̪] and [v] as its allophones. Both of these allophones occur as the first member of a geminate cluster. They are in free variation.
- The approximant /j/ has one allophone: [ɥ]. [ɥ] occurs after /o/.

Vowel phonemes
	Front	Back
High	i	
Mid	e	o
Close	a	

/e/ becomes a slightly centralized [e̞] when in a syllable whose coda is /k/. When in the nucleus, /a/ and /o/ are slightly raised and /i/ is lowered.

There are two degrees of stress in Bontoc: primary and secondary. Primary stress is phonemic and secondary stress is predictable. Both types are right-oriented and occur on one of the last three syllables. Stress's effects include higher pitch, louder volume, and lengthening of the syllable nucleus, though these are all subject to certain rules pertaining to word prosody.

== Example text ==
=== The Lord's Prayer ===
Ama id chaya machad-ayaw nan ngachanmo.
Omali nan en-ap-apowam.
Maangnen nan nemnemmo isnan lofong ay kag id chaya.
Ichowam nan kanenmi isnan kawakawakas.
Pakawanem nan fasolmi,
tay pinakawanmi akhes nan finmasol ken chakami.
Ad-im ogkhayen chakami isnan maawisanmi ay enfasol,
mod-i ket isas alakam chakami isnan ngaag.

— Nan Kalin Apo Dios. International Bible Society. 1992.
Translation:

Our Father in heaven,
hallowed be your name.
Your kingdom come,
your will be done,
on earth, as it is in heaven.
Give us this day our daily bread,
and forgive us our debts,
as we also have forgiven our debtors.
And lead us not into temptation,
but deliver us from evil.
