= Bontoc people =

Ethnic group of the Philippines

Bontoc
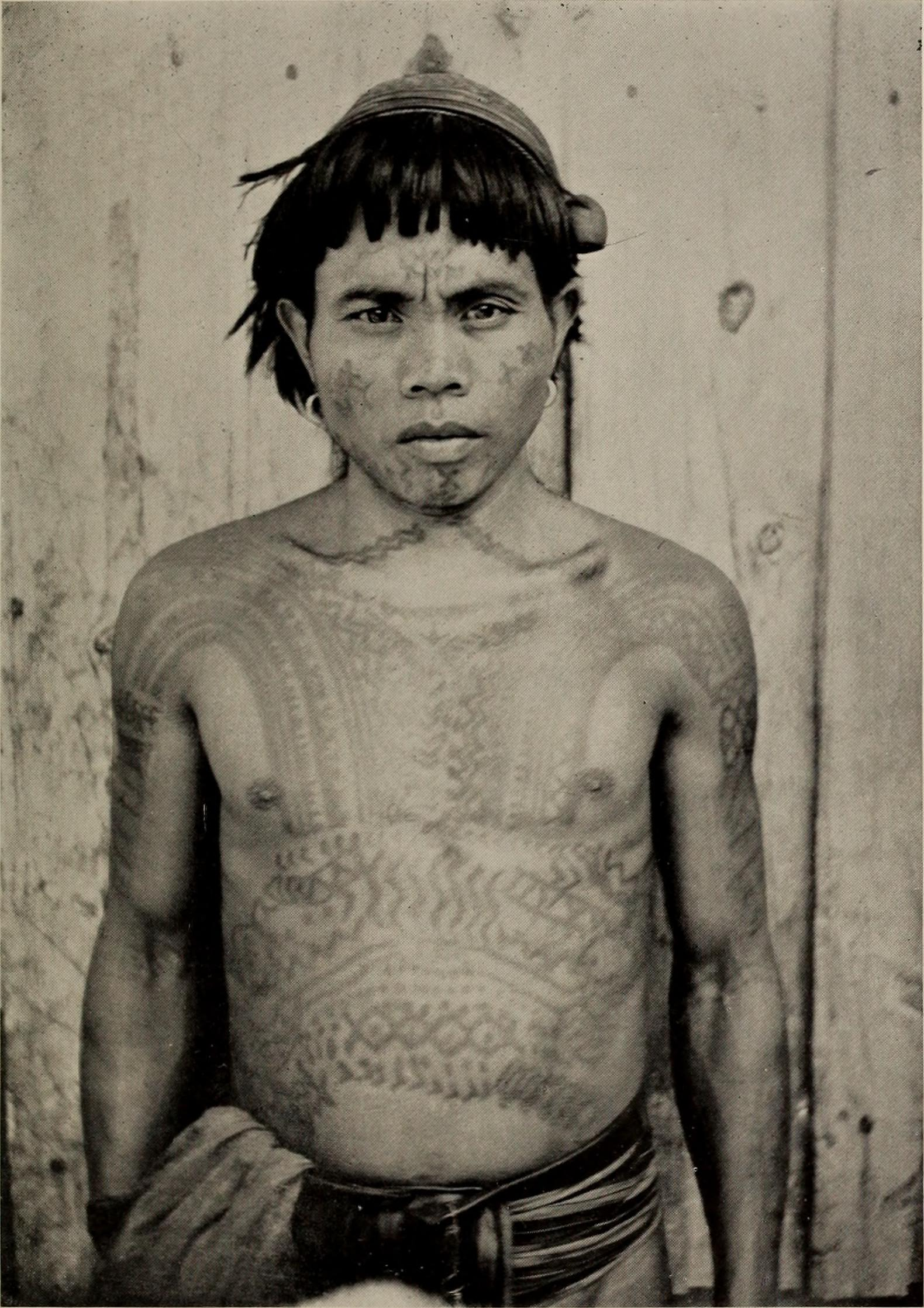
- A Bontoc man (c. 1903)

Total population
- 72,084 (2020 census)

Regions with significant populations
- Philippines (Cordillera Administrative Region)

Languages
- Bontoc, Ilocano, Tagalog

Religion
- Christianity, indigenous folk religion

Related ethnic groups
- Igorot peoples

The Bontoc (or Bontok) ethnolinguistic group can be found in the central and eastern portions of Mountain Province, on the island of Luzon in the Philippines. They formerly practiced head-hunting and had distinctive body tattoos.

== Bontoc culture area ==
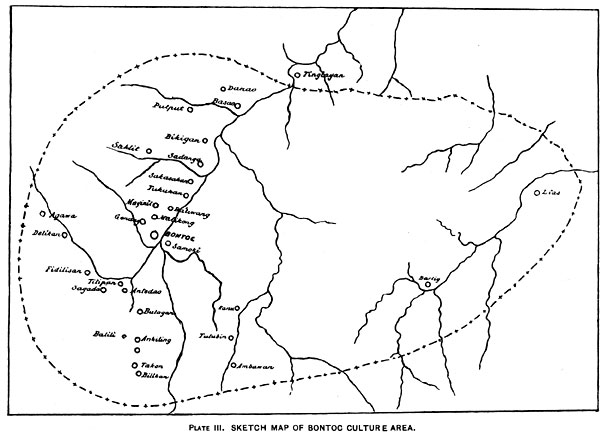
A 1905 sketch map showing the historical extent of the Bontoc culture area, including Barlig and Lias.

According to early ethnographic mapping by Albert Ernest Jenks, the specific Bontoc culture area is geographically bounded by the central and eastern mountains of Mountain Province. This cultural zone encompasses the current municipalities of Bontoc and Sadanga, extending eastward to include the settlements of Barlig Central and Lias.

However, this cultural map terminates at the eastern ridges of Barlig, specifically excluding the Kadaklan region, as well as the municipalities of Natonin (home of the Balangao people) and Paracelis (home of the Gaddang Baliwon). These eastern groups represent distinct ethnolinguistic lineages outside the core Bontoc cultural sphere.

== Geography ==
The Bontoc live in a mountainous territory, particularly close to the Chico River and its tributaries. Mineral resources (gold, copper, limestone, gypsum) can be found in the mountain areas. Gold, in particular, has been traditionally extracted from the Bontoc municipality. The Chico River provides sand, gravel, and white clay, while the forests of Barlig and Sadanga within the area have rattan, bamboo and pine trees. They are the second largest group in the Mountain Province.

== Social organization ==
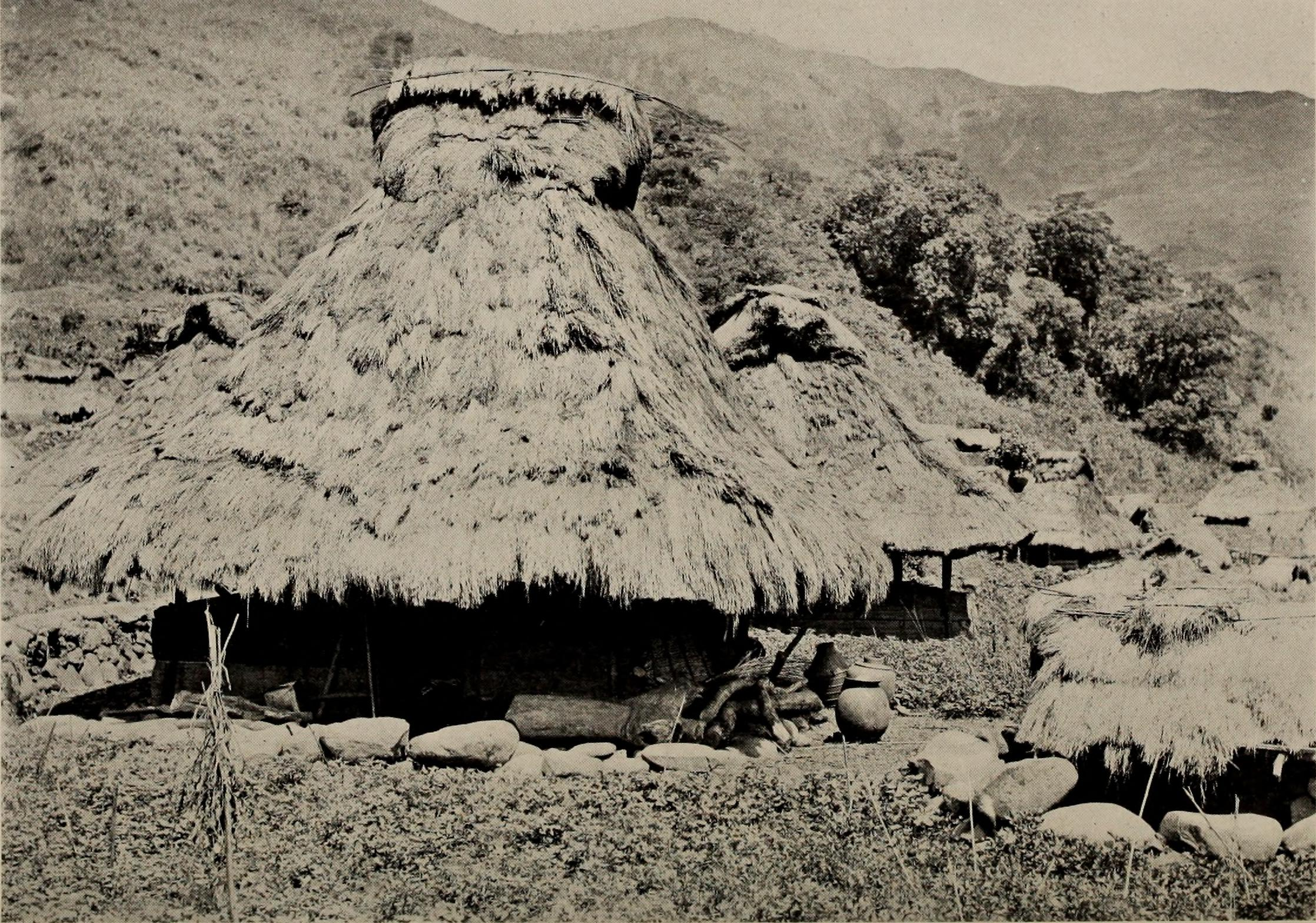
A traditional Bontoc house, 1903. Bale house of Igorot people with its skeletal displays.

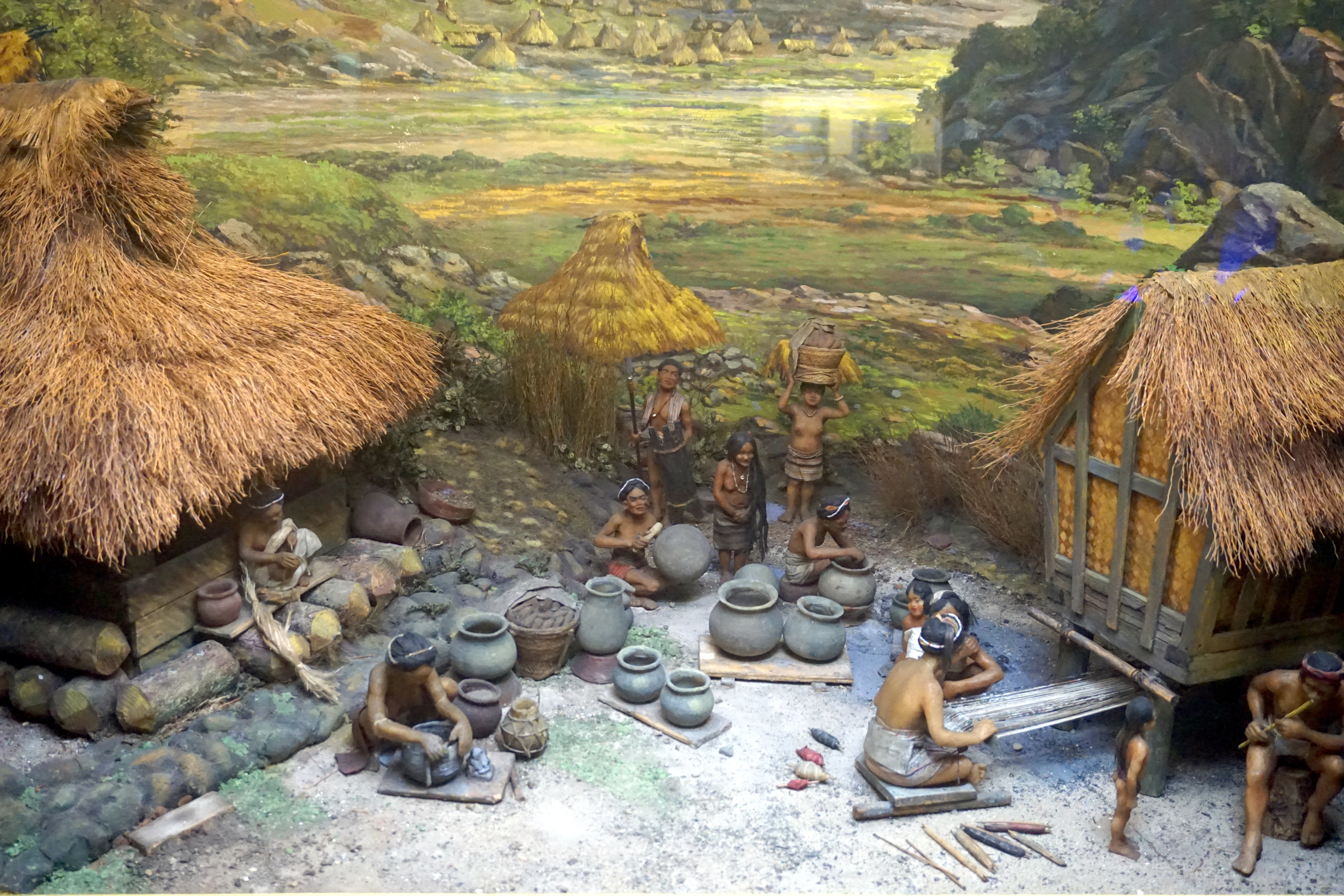
The Bontoc Women's Work diorama at the Milwaukee Public Museum

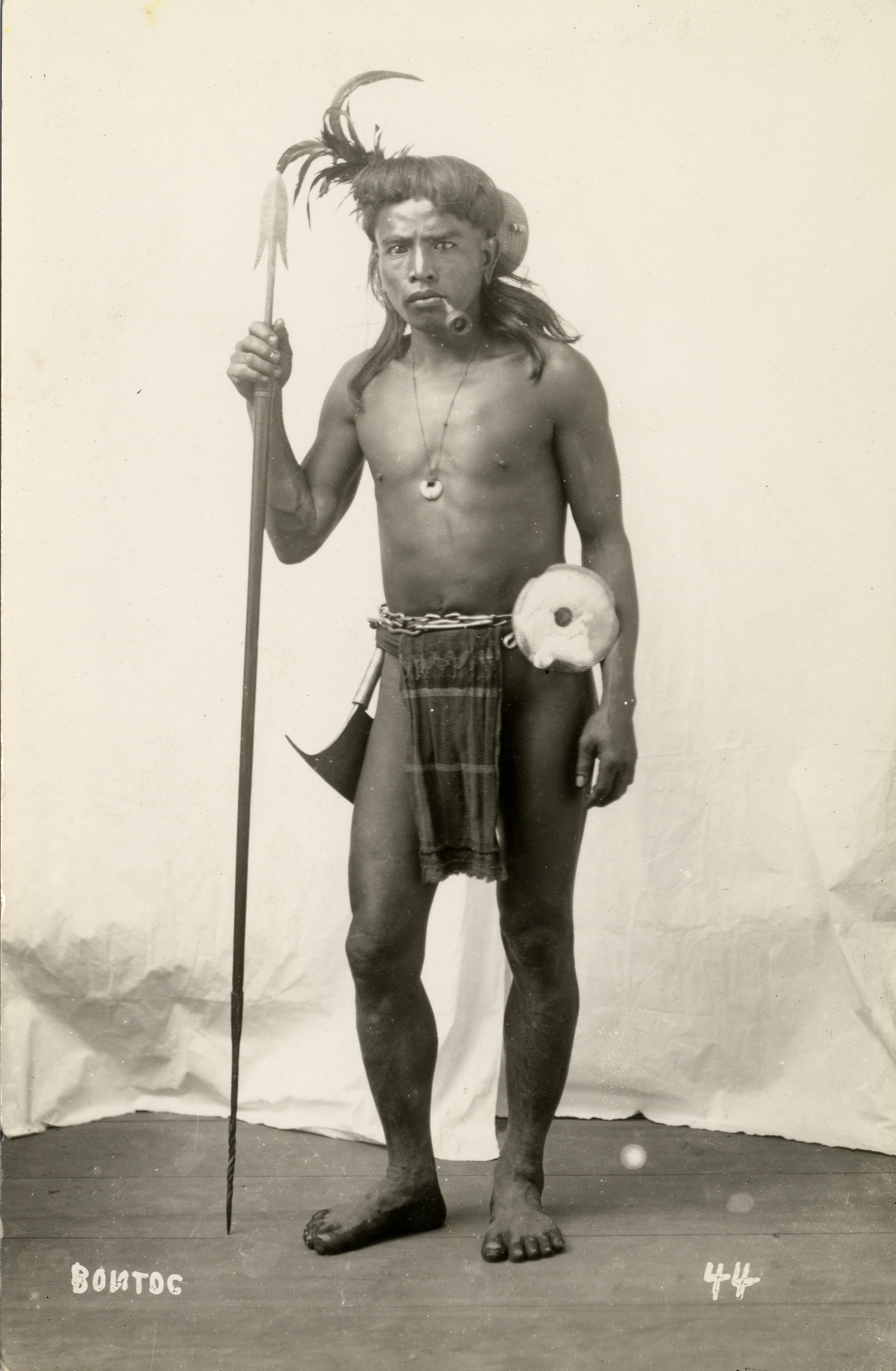
Man with a spear at Bontoc in the Philippines, circa pre-1935

The Bontoc social structure used to be centered around village wards containing about 14 to 50 homes. Traditionally, young men and women lived in dormitories and ate meals with their families. This gradually changed with the advent of Christianity. Bontocs have three different indigenous housing structures: the residence place of the family (katyufong), the dormitories for females (olog), and the dormitories for males (ato/ator). Different structures are mostly associated with agricultural needs, such as rice granaries (akhamang) and pigpens (khongo). Traditionally, all structures have inatep, cogon grass roofs. Bontoc houses also have numerous utensils, tools, and weapons: like cooking tools; agricultural tools like bolos, trowels, and plows, bamboo or rattan fish traps.

The Bontoc take pride in their kinship ties and oneness as a group (sinpangili) based on affiliations, history together against intruders, and community rituals for agriculture and matters which affect the entire province, like natural disasters. Kinship groups have two main functions: controlling property and regulating marriage. However, they are also important for the mutual cooperation of the group's members.

There are generally three social classes in Bontoc society, the kakachangyan (rich), the wad-ay ngachanna (middle-class), and the lawa (poor). The rich sponsor feasts, and assist those in distress, as a demonstration of their wealth. The poor usually work as sharecroppers or as laborers for the rich. The Bontoc people had a caste called the kadangyan whose members had specialised leadership roles, married only within the same caste, and wore specialised clothing.

== Language ==
The Bontoc speak Bontoc, Ilocano and Tagalog

== Culture ==
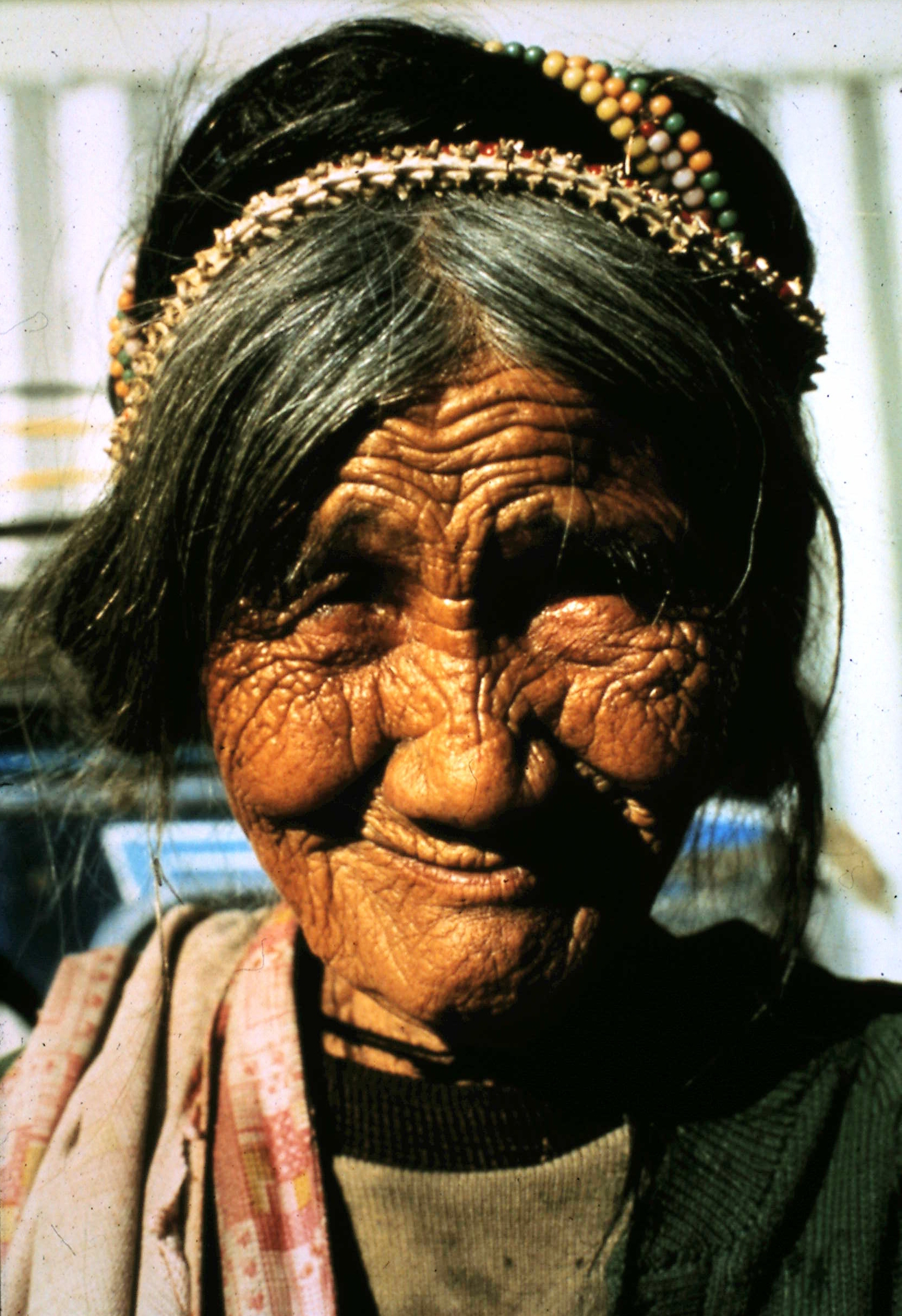
A Bontoc woman with a snake skeleton in her hair. Skeletons serve as a charm against lightning.

In the past, the Bontoc engaged in none of the usual pastimes or games of chance practiced in other areas of the country but did perform a circular rhythmic dance acting out certain aspects of the hunt, always accompanied by the gangsa or bronze gong. There was no singing or talking during the dance drama, but the women took part, usually outside the circumference. It was a serious but pleasurable event for all concerned, including the children. Present-day Bontocs are a peaceful agricultural people who have, by choice, retained most of their traditional culture despite frequent contacts with other groups. Music is also important to Bontoc life, and is usually played during ceremonies. Songs and chants are accompanied by nose flutes (kalaleng), gongs (gangsa), bamboo mouth organ (affiliao), and Jew's harp (ab-a-fiw). Wealthy families make use of jewelry, which are commonly made of gold, glass beads, agate beads (appong), or shells, to show their status.

Men wear g-strings (wanes) and a rattan cap (suklong). Women wear skirts (tapis).

Bontoc people use weapons such as battleaxes (}pin-nang/pinangas), knives and spears (falfeg, fangkao, sinalawitan), and shields (kalasag).

The ritual pasiking of the Bontoc is called the takba, and represents an ancestor figure, and active participant in begnas rituals.

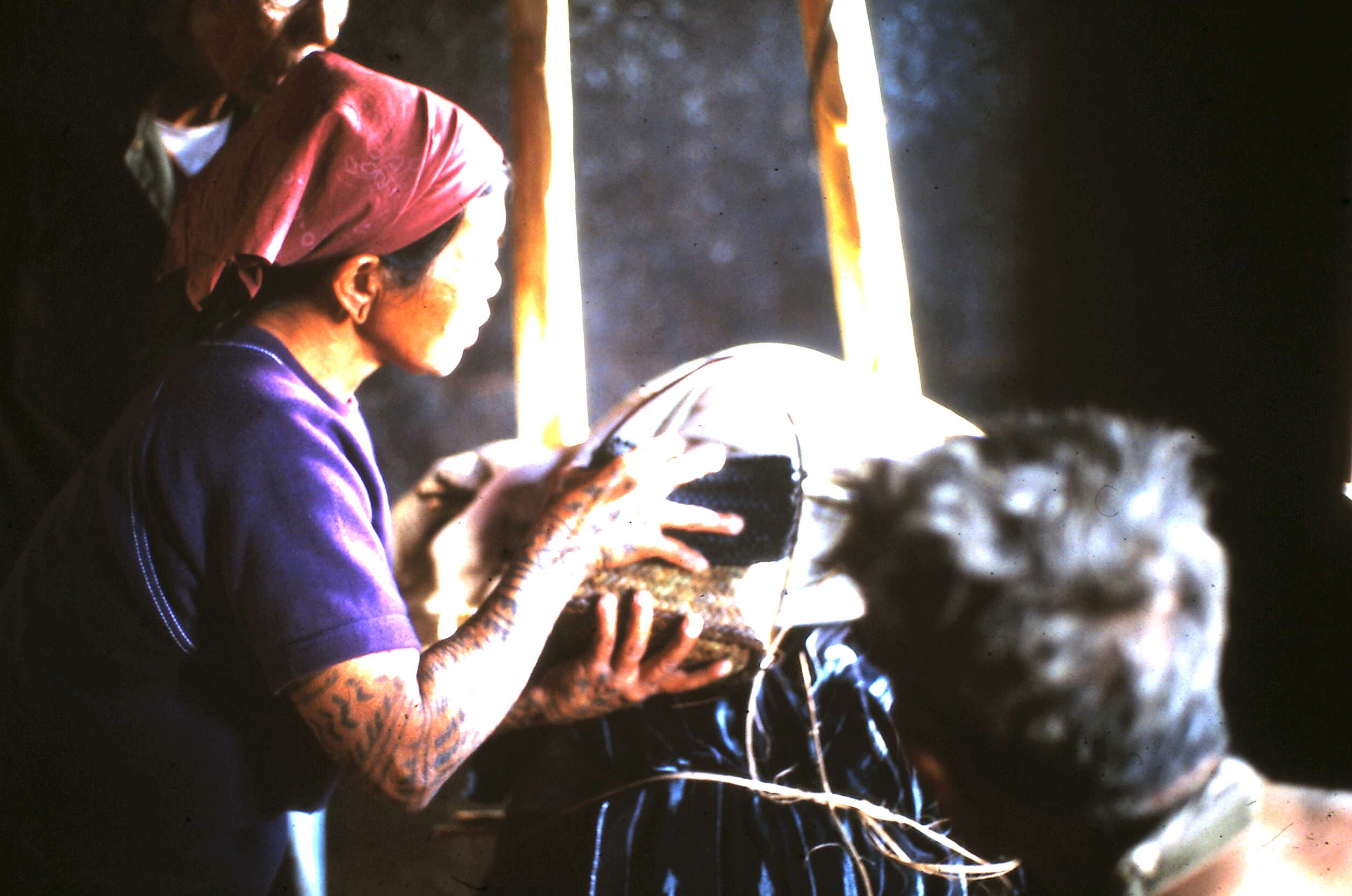
A traditional Bontoc ritual during a wake with a death chair.

=== Tattoos ===
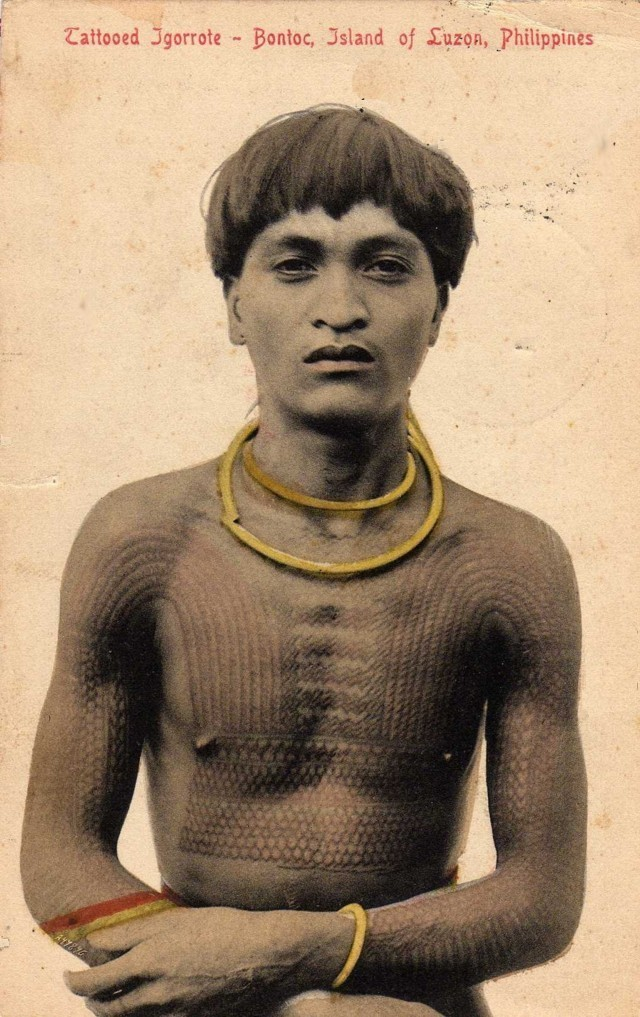
A Bontoc man with tattoos

Among the Bontoc people, tattoos are known as fatek. The Bontoc describe three types of tattoos: The chaklag, the tattooed chest of the head taker; pongo, the tattooed arms of men and women; and fatĕk, for all other tattoos of both sexes. Women were tattooed on the arms only, which they did to enhance their beauty or to signify their readiness for marriage. The arms were the most visible parts of the body during traditional dances. It is believed that men would not court women who are not tattooed. Tattoos indicated that the man was a warrior who had taken heads during battle. One method of tattooing used was the ‘puncture/cut and smear’ method. The bumafatek (tattooist) would first draw the pattern on the skin with ink of soot and water, and then prick the skin with a chakayyum, and lastly, scatter soot into the open skin and manually work the pigment into the skin with their hands.

=== Cuisine ===
Rice is considered as the main produce of the Bontocs but during the dry periods from February to March when rain is scarce, they usually consume camote, corn and millet as alternative for rice. The Bontoc also catch and gather fish, snails and crabs for consumption or for sale. In the earlier days, Bontoc men usually brought tobacco and matches when hunting for wild deer and wild pigs. In the forests, they also gather rattan, edible fruits, beeswax and honey, and wild edible or ornamental plants.

== Indigenous religion ==
The pre-Christian Bontoc belief system centers on a hierarchy of spirits, the highest being a supreme deity called Intutungcho, whose son, Lumawig, descended from the sky (chayya), to marry a Bontoc girl. Lumawig taught the Bontoc their arts and skills, including irrigation of their land. The Bontoc also believe in the anito, spirits of the dead, who are omnipresent and must be constantly consoled. Anyone can invoke the anito, but a seer (insup-ok) intercedes when someone is sick through evil spirits.

The indigenous religion of the Bontoc has been preserved for centuries. The Bontoc believe in a unique pantheon of deities, of which the supreme god is the cultural hero, Lumawig, son of Kabunian. There are many sacred sites associated with Lumawig and a variety of Bontoc deities. Oral tradition tells that Lumawig instilled five great lessons to the Bontoc people, namely: (1) a man must not steal; (2) one should not gossip; (3) men and women must not commit adultery; (4) one must be temperate in eating and in drinking alcoholic drinks; and (5) all people must live simple and industrious lives.

=== Bontoc gods ===
- Intutungcho (Kabunian): the supreme deity living above; also referred to as Kabunian; father of Lumawig and two other sons
- Lumawig: also referred as the supreme deity and the second son of Kabunian; an epic hero who taught the Bontoc their five core values for an egalitarian society The Bontoc hero Lumawig instituted their ator, a political institution identified with a ceremonial place adorned with headhunting skulls. Lumawig also gave the Bontoc their irrigation skills, Taboos, rituals, and ceremonies after he descended from the sky (chayya) and married a Bontoc girl. Each ator has a council of elders, called ingtugtukon, who are experts in custom laws (adat). Decisions are by consensus.
- First Son of Kabunian
- Third Son of Kabunian
- Chal-chal: the god of the sun whose son's head was cut off by Kabigat; aided the god Lumawig in finding a spouse
- Kabigat: the goddess of the moon who cut of the head of Chal-chal's son; her action is the origin of headhunting
- Son of Chal-chal: his head was cut off by Kabigat; revived by Chal-chal, who bear no ill will against Kabigat
- Ob-Obanan: a deity whose white hair is inhabited by insects, ants, centipedes, and all the vermins that bother mankind; punished a man for his rudeness by giving him a basket filled with all the insects and reptiles in the world
- Chacha’: the god of warriors
- Ked-Yem: the god of blacksmiths who cut off the heads of the two sons of Chacha’ because they were destroying his work; was later challenged by Chacha’, which eventually led into a pechen pact to stop the fighting
- Two Sons of Chacha’: beheaded by Ked-Yem, because they were destroying his work

=== Other figures ===
- Fucan: younger of the two girls met by Lumawig in Lanao; married to Lumawig; later adopted the name Cayapon; died after dancing in a taboo way, which led to death being the norm among mortals
- Two Sons of Cayapon: the two children of Lumawig and Fucan; helped the people of Caneo, who afterwards killed by the two brothers
- Batanga: father of the two girls met by Lumawig in Lanao

== See also ==
- Igorot people
