= Balangao people =

Coordinates: 17°06′31″N 121°16′45″E

Balangao
iFarangao

Total population
- 17,736"2020 Census of Population and Housing, Table B - Population by Ethnicity". Philippine Statistics Authority. 2020. (2020 census)

Regions with significant populations
- Philippines (Cordillera Administrative Region)

Languages
- Balangaw, Ilocano, Tagalog

Religion
- Christianity, indigenous folk religion

Related ethnic groups
- Igorot peoples

The Balangao people predominantly inhabit the majority of the municipality of Natonin, with the exception of the barangays of Maducayan, Saliok, and Banao (home to the Majukayong and Kachakran peoples), and extend into parts of the neighboring municipality of Paracelis. According to the linguistic research of Joanne Shetler, the Balangao-speaking population consists of two primary sub-dialectal groups: the Ha'ki (inhabiting the western regions) and the Balangao proper. The Balangao have historically been conflated with neighboring groups, such as the Bontoc people, due to early 20th-century administrative classifications. They are frequently misidentified in colonial-era literature and modern aggregators by the exonym Baliwon (or Boliwon), a term more accurately applied to the highland Gaddang (Ga'dang) of Paracelis.

== Origins and Ethnogenesis ==
While some popular narratives suggest that the Balangao are a result of intermarriage between neighboring groups such as the Gaddang and Ifugao, linguistic and ethnographic evidence suggests a more distinct origin.

=== Proto-Nuclear Cordilleran Hypothesis ===
Linguistic studies by Lawrence Reid (1974) classify the Balangao language as a primary branch of the Nuclear Cordilleran group. This suggests that the Balangao people did not descend from the Bontoc or Ifugao, but rather developed as a distinct group from a common ancestor (Proto-Nuclear Cordilleran) alongside them. This "in situ" development in the Natonin region explains the unique phonological features of the language, such as the schwa (ë) on final a's on words, a trait shared with Mayaoyao Ifugao, and specific palatalization shifts shared with Eastern Bontoc (Finallig) varieties especially by the Ha'ki dialect.

=== Physical and Cultural Distinctiveness ===
Proponents of a distinct Balangao origin point to phenotypical similarities with neighboring mountain tribes (Barlig and Bontoc) and significant differences from lowland groups like the Gaddang. The Balangao maintain a unique cultural identity centered on their ancestral heartland in Natonin, which they have occupied since pre-colonial times.

== Population ==
As of 2020, the Philippine Statistics Authority (PSA) recorded a total of 16,446 individuals identifying as Balangao and an additional 1,290 identifying as Balangao-Lias nationwide. In contrast, the Joshua Project provides a higher estimate of approximately 33,000 for the total "Balangao" people group in the Philippines (2025 estimate). Historically, the population has shown steady growth; in 1974, linguistic researcher Joanne Shetler recorded approximately 5,844 people living in the Balangao area of Natonin.

== Culture ==
=== Dance ===
Traditional dance among the Balangao people serves as a primary medium for social storytelling and communal expression. These performances are typically accompanied by the rhythmic striking of gangsa (brass gongs).

==== Courtship Dance ====
A notable narrative dance involves a male and female pair performing a mimetic courtship ritual. The male dancer, clad in a traditional teyay, utilizes a large woven cloth (often a blanket with similar pattern as the petay) which he manipulates in broad, sweeping motions. These movements are intended to mimic the wings of a bird or a rooster in a display of protection and pursuit. The female dancer, wearing the petay, responds with controlled, rhythmic footwork and subtle arm gestures, symbolizing grace and modesty.

==== Torayan ====
The Torayan is a communal dance characterized by its high energy and synchronized movements. It is frequently performed during major cultural events, such as the Lang-ay Festival.

- Form and Posture: Dancers typically adopt a "T-pose," extending their arms horizontally at shoulder height. This posture is maintained while the dancers move in a collective formation, such as a line or a circle.
- Rhythm and Footwork: The Torayan is distinguished by an accelerated gong tempo, termed as Sennapor. Dancers perform precise, rapid footwork—often involving rhythmic stomping or hopping—that is strictly synchronized with the beat of the gangsa. The collective sound of the dancers' feet serves as a secondary percussive element to the music.

The torayan is a traditional dance form shared among the Balangao, Finallig, Madukayan, Ga'dang, and Tanudan tribes. While it is broadly categorized under the "eagle dance" tradition of the eastern Cordillera, the Balangao version is distinguished by its unique tempo and posture. Unlike the turayan of neighboring groups, which may involve fluid, waving arm movements to mimic flight, the Balangao torayan is characterized by a high-energy, fast-paced rhythmic beat. Performers typically maintain a rigid "T-pose" with arms extended horizontally at shoulder height, focusing the movement on synchronized footwork that precisely mirrors the rapid striking of the gangsa (gongs).

=== Traditional Attire ===
The Balangao people maintain a distinct weaving tradition characterized by specific color palettes and geometric linear patterns. The traditional clothing is worn during rituals, community gatherings, and cultural celebrations.

==== Women's Attire (Petay and Halepon) ====
The traditional female ensemble consists of the petay (wrap-around skirt) and various accessories known collectively as halepon.

- Petay (Skirt): A hand-woven wrap-around skirt dominated by horizontal stripes. The primary color scheme involves deep indigo blue and madder red, accented by thinner stripes of yellow, white, and occasionally green. The weave features a thick blue band at the top and bottom, with a complex series of multicolored stripes concentrated in the mid-section.
- Halepon (Accessories):
  - Beaded Jewelry: Women wear multiple strands of long, layered necklaces made of traditional beads (usually in white, red, black, and yellow). Some necklaces extend down to the waist.
  - Headpieces: Beaded headbands or "sa'ngi" that match the color profile of the necklaces, often featuring intricate geometric arrangements.
  - Modern Integration: In contemporary settings, the petay is often paired with a white blouse or colored t-shirts, though traditional beaded vests or embroidered white tops are also used.

==== Men's Attire (Teyay) ====
The traditional male garment is the teyay/tayay, a hand-woven loincloth or G-string.

- Teyay (Loincloth): Unlike the darker tones of the women's petay, the teyay is characterized by a vibrant, bright red base.
- Patterns: It features bold, vertical stripes (when worn) of yellow. The ends of the loincloth (the flaps) are often finished with long, thick fringes that hang down the front and back.
- Wear: The garment is wrapped around the waist and passed between the legs, with the decorative ends displayed prominently. Traditionally, men are shirtless when wearing the teyay for ceremonial purposes, emphasizing the intricate weave of the fabric against the skin.

== Language ==
Their language is called Balangao, a member of the Central Cordilleran subgroup of Northern Luzon languages.

== Economy ==
The Balangao tribe focuses mainly on farming, either in rice terraces or on lands that were cleared by fire. Many younger Balangao have been exposed to education and modernization, changing the once traditional society of the tribe.
