= Bontoc, Mountain Province =

Capital of the Mountain Province, Philippines

Bontoc
- Municipality
- Municipality of Bontoc
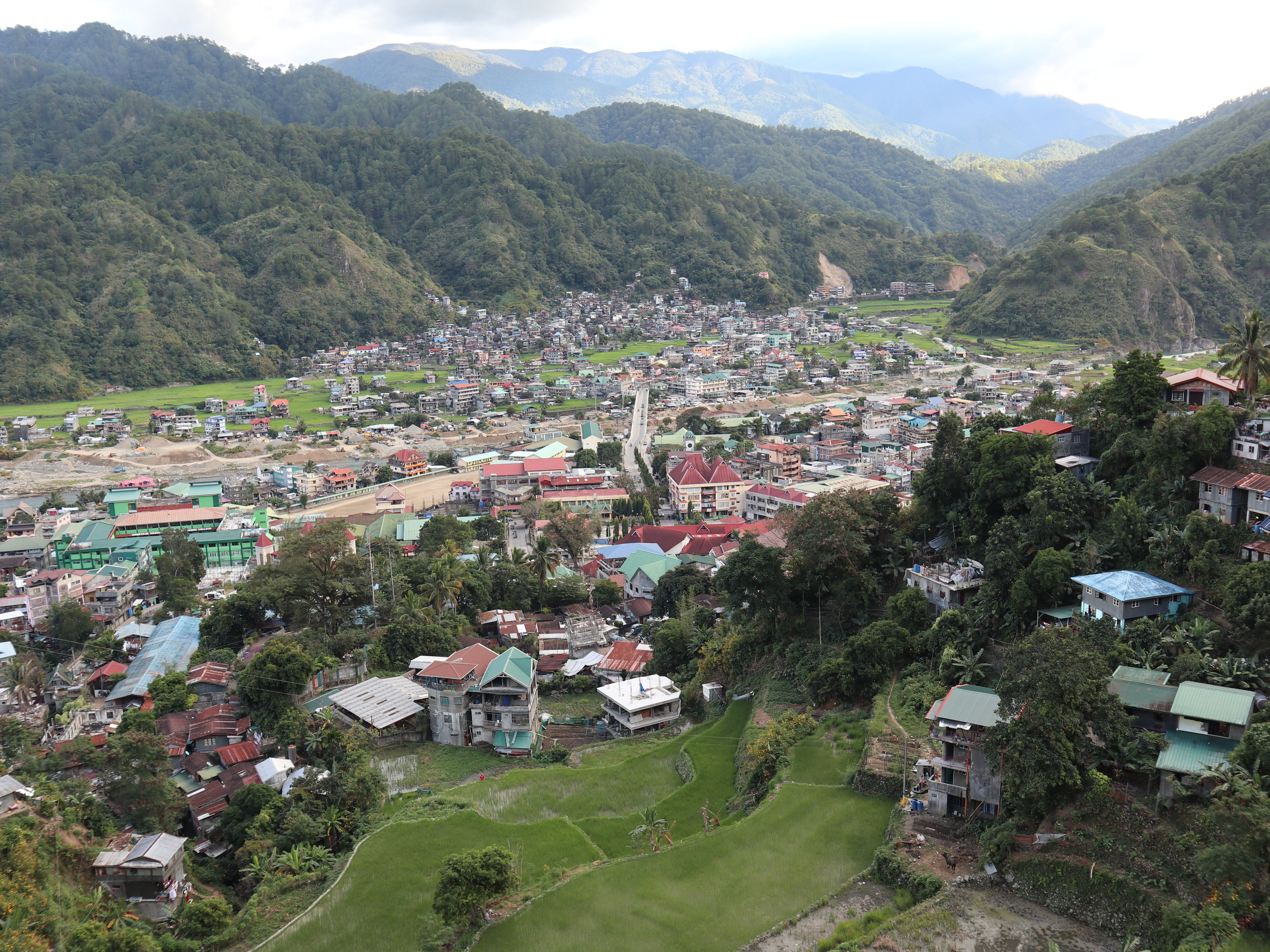
- Bontoc in 2022

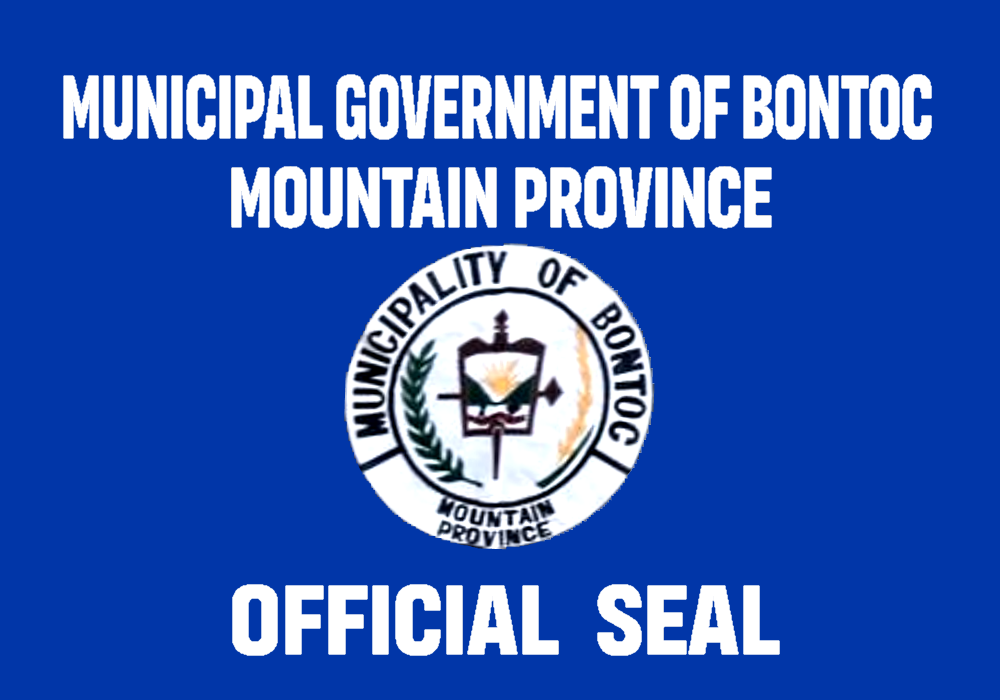
- Flag Seal

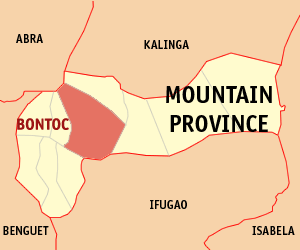
- Map of Mountain Province with Bontoc highlighted
- Interactive map of Bontoc
- Location within the Philippines
- Coordinates: 17°05′24″N 120°58′38″E
- Country: Philippines
- Region: Cordillera Administrative Region
- Province: Mountain Province
- District: Lone district
- Founded: 1908
- Barangays: 16 (see Barangays)

Government
  - Type: Sangguniang Bayan
  - Mayor: Jerome B. Tudlong, Jr.
  - Vice Mayor: Eusebio S. Kabluyen
  - Representative: Maximo Y. Dalog Jr.
  - Municipal Council: Members: Jupiter Jule Kalangeg; Dan Evert Sokoken; Glenn Bacala; Peter Kedawen; Julian Chumacog; Timothy Pongad, Jr.; Benedict Odsey II; Viola Okko
  - Electorate: 16,723 voters (2025)

Area
  - Total: 396.10 km^{2} (152.94 sq mi)
- Elevation: 1,173 m (3,848 ft)
- Highest elevation: 1,833 m (6,014 ft)
- Lowest elevation: 804 m (2,638 ft)

Population (2024 census)
  - Total: 23,466
  - Density: 59.243/km^{2} (153.44/sq mi)
  - Households: 6,452

Economy
  - Income class: 1st municipal income class
  - Poverty incidence: 9.3% (2023)
  - Revenue: ₱ 236.9 million (2024)
  - Assets: ₱ 455.2 million (2024)
  - Expenditure: ₱ 217.4 million (2024)
  - Liabilities: ₱ 114.1 million (2024)

Service provider
  - Electricity: Mountain Province Electric Cooperative (MOPRECO)
- Time zone: UTC+8 (PST)
- ZIP code: 2616
- PSGC: 1404404000
- IDD : area code: +63 (0)74
- Native languages: Finontok; Ilocano; Tagalog; Kankanaey
- Website: lgubontoc.gov.ph

Bontoc, officially the Municipality of Bontoc (Bontok: Ili nan Bóntoc; Balangao: Fabrey hen Funtok; Kankanaey: Ili di Bóntoc; Ilocano: Ili ti Bóntoc; Tagalog: Bayan ng Bóntoc; Spanish: Municipio de Bóntoc), is a municipality and capital of the province of Mountain Province, Philippines. According to the 2024 census, it has a population of 23,466 people.

Bontoc is the historical capital of the entire Cordillera region since the inception of governance in the Cordillera. The municipality celebrates the annual Lang-ay Festival.

Bontoc is home to the Indigenous Bontoc people. The town also hosts the UNESCO tentatively-listed Alab petroglyphs.

== Etymology ==
The name Bontoc is derived from the morphemes bun (heap) and tuk (top), collectively meaning "mountains." The term is used to refer to the people of the Mountain Province, the capital municipality, including its cultural practices, and its native language.

== History ==
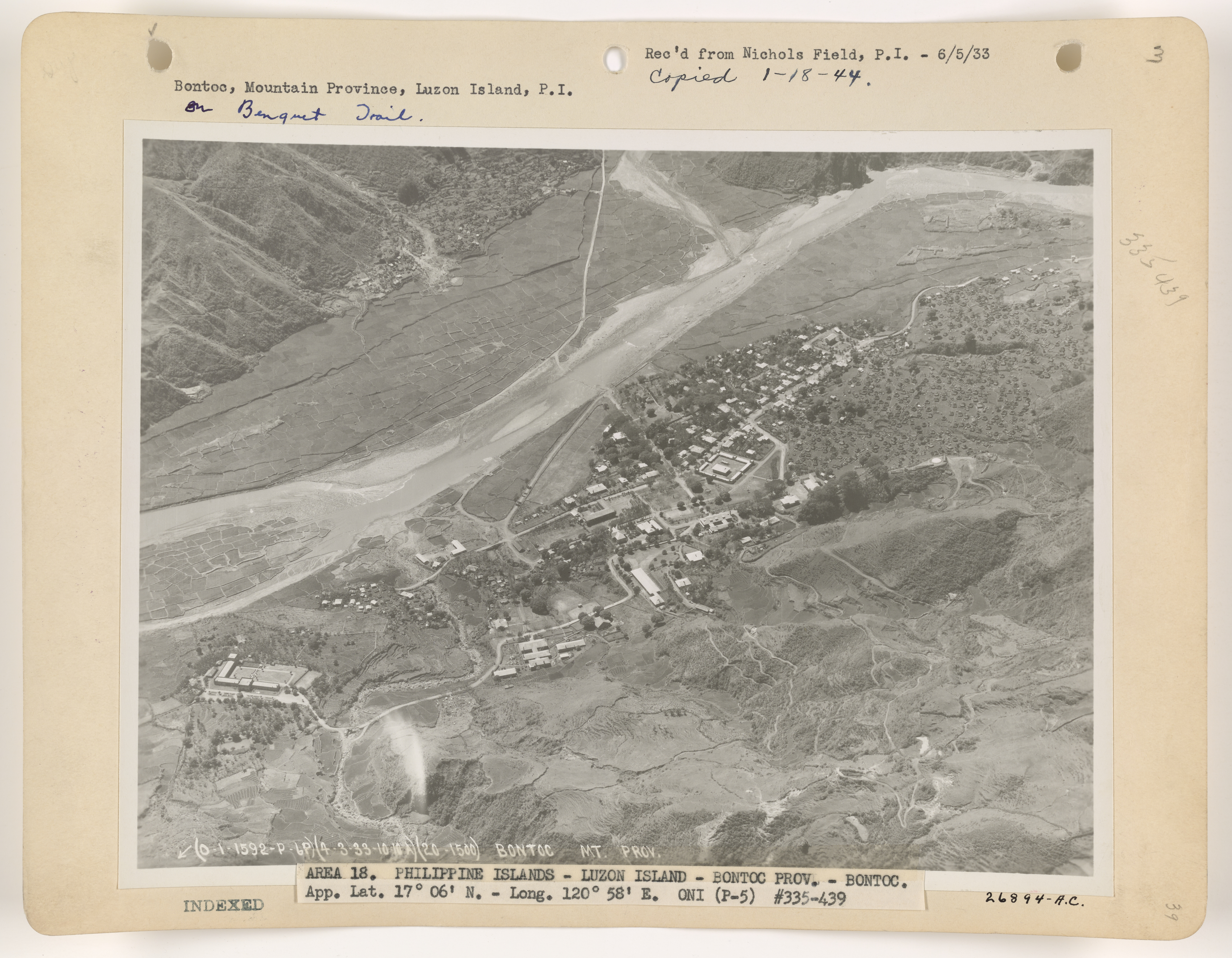
Aerial view of Bontoc, 1933

Samuel E. Kane, the American supervisor and then Governor, established the capital here after the Philippine Commission passed the Mountain Province Act in 1908, building a provincial building, hospital, doctor's office, nurse's home, a school, and provincial prison. He also built the Tagudin-Bontoc trail, which by 1926, could accommodate a small car.

Bontoc was one of several municipalities in Mountain Province which would have been flooded by the Chico River Dam Project during the Marcos administration, alongside Bauko, Sabangan, Sagada, Sadanga, and parts of Barlig. However, the indigenous peoples of Kalinga Province and Mountain Province resisted the project and when hostilities resulted in the murder of Macli-ing Dulag, the project became unpopular and was abandoned before Marcos was ousted by the 1986 People Power Revolution.

== Geography ==
Bontoc is situated 387.10 kilometres (240.53 mi) from the country's capital city of Manila.

=== Barangays ===
Bontoc is politically subdivided into 16 barangays. Each barangay consists of puroks and some have sitios.

- Alab Oriente
- Alab Proper
- Balili
- Bayyo
- Bontoc Ili
- Calutit
- Caneo
- Dalican
- Gonogon
- Guinaang
- Mainit
- Maligcong
- Poblacion (Bontoc)
- Samoki
- Talubin
- Tocucan

=== Climate ===
Climate data for Bontoc, Mountain Province
| Month | Jan | Feb | Mar | Apr | May | Jun | Jul | Aug | Sep | Oct | Nov | Dec | Year |
|---|---|---|---|---|---|---|---|---|---|---|---|---|---|
| Mean daily maximum °C (°F) | 23 (73) | 24 (75) | 25 (77) | 27 (81) | 27 (81) | 26 (79) | 25 (77) | 25 (77) | 25 (77) | 25 (77) | 24 (75) | 23 (73) | 25 (77) |
| Mean daily minimum °C (°F) | 16 (61) | 16 (61) | 17 (63) | 19 (66) | 20 (68) | 21 (70) | 21 (70) | 21 (70) | 20 (68) | 19 (66) | 18 (64) | 17 (63) | 19 (66) |
| Average precipitation mm (inches) | 35 (1.4) | 46 (1.8) | 63 (2.5) | 117 (4.6) | 402 (15.8) | 400 (15.7) | 441 (17.4) | 471 (18.5) | 440 (17.3) | 258 (10.2) | 94 (3.7) | 68 (2.7) | 2,835 (111.6) |
| Average rainy days | 9.9 | 9.5 | 13.9 | 18.9 | 26.0 | 27.3 | 28.9 | 28.5 | 26.1 | 19.7 | 14.5 | 12.8 | 236 |
Source: Meteoblue (modeled/calculated data, not measured locally)

== Demographics ==
Population census of Bontoc

| Year | Pop. | ±% p.a. |
|---|---|---|
| 1918 | 13,948 | — |
| 1939 | 14,284 | +0.11% |
| 1948 | 15,005 | +0.55% |
| 1960 | 16,301 | +0.69% |
| 1970 | 16,901 | +0.36% |

| Year | Pop. | ±% p.a. |
|---|---|---|
| 1975 | 17,476 | +0.67% |
| 1980 | 17,091 | −0.44% |
| 1990 | 17,716 | +0.36% |
| 1995 | 21,192 | +3.41% |
| 2000 | 22,308 | +1.11% |

| Year | Pop. | ±% p.a. |
|---|---|---|
| 2007 | 24,798 | +1.47% |
| 2010 | 23,980 | −1.21% |
| 2015 | 24,643 | +0.52% |
| 2020 | 24,104 | −0.46% |
| 2024 | 23,466 | −0.64% |

Source: Philippine Statistics Authority

In the 2024 census, the population of Bontoc was 23,466 people, with a density of 59 inhabitants per square kilometer or 150 inhabitants per square mile.

=== Languages ===
Most inhabitants speak the Bontoc language, with other major languages being Kankana-ey and Ilocano. Minor languages spoken include Tagalog, Pangasinan, Cuyonon, and Butuanon.

== Economy ==
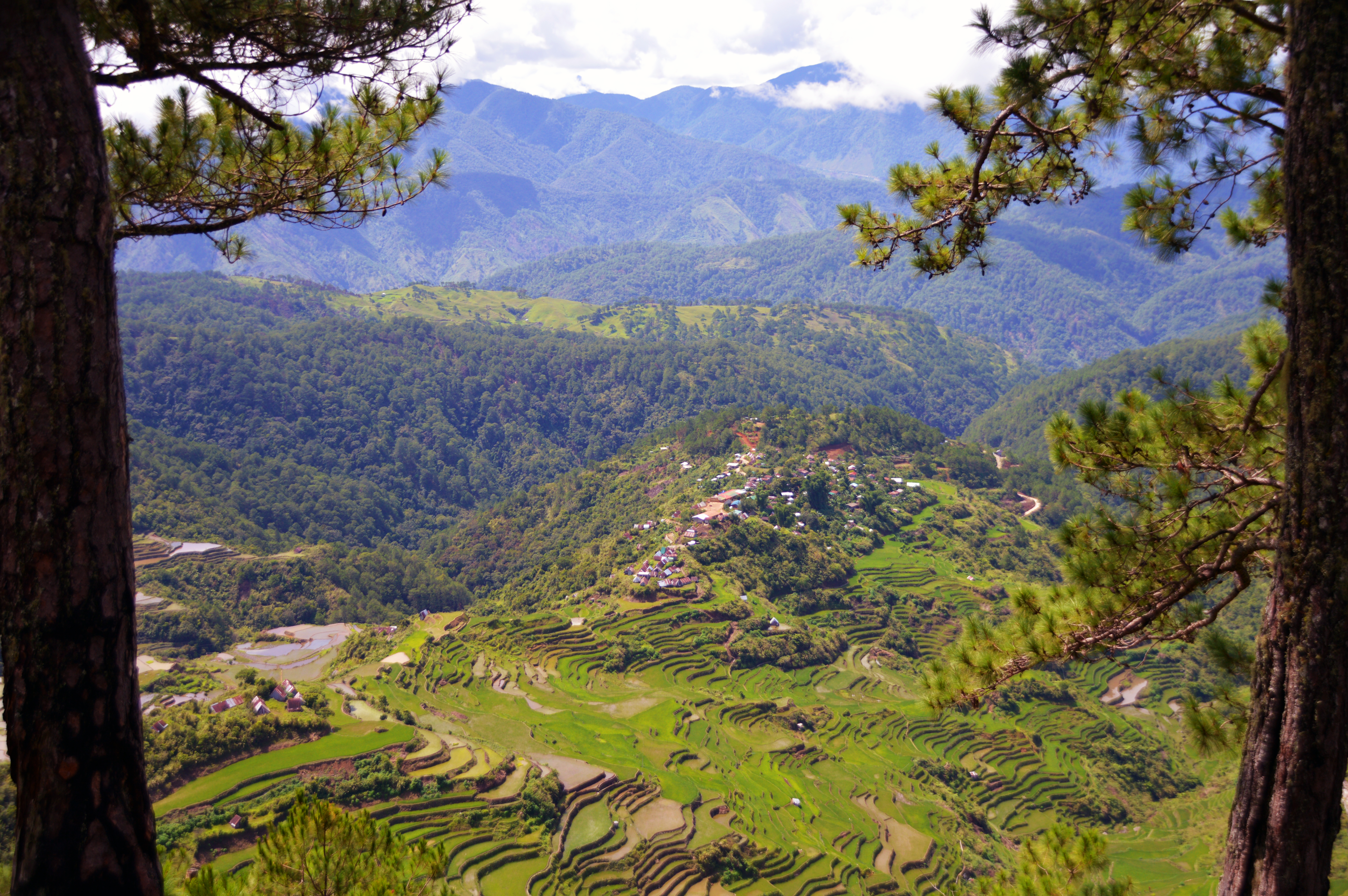
Maligcong Rice terraces of Bontoc.

Poverty incidence of Bontoc (%)

Source: Philippine Statistics Authority

The local economy depends largely on small trades and agriculture. This capital town's biggest economic potential is tourism with its smaller rice terraces in Barangay Bay-yo, Maligcong and other areas.

== Government ==
=== Local government ===
Bontoc, belonging to the lone congressional district of the province of Mountain Province, is governed by a mayor designated as its local chief executive and by a municipal council as its legislative body in accordance with the Local Government Code. The mayor, vice mayor, and the councilors are elected directly by the people through an election which is being held every three years.

=== Elected officials ===
Members of the Municipal Council (2025–2028)
| Position | Name |
|---|---|
| Congressman | Maximo Y. Dalog Jr. |
| Mayor | Franklin C. Odsey |
| Vice-Mayor | Alsannyster F. Patingan |
| Councilors | Glenn D. Bacala |
| Councilors | Seichi E. Ofo-ob |
| Councilors | Jupiter Jule K. Kalangeg |
| Councilors | Dan Evert C. Sokoken |
| Councilors | Jimmy K. Cherwaken |
| Councilors | Timothy N. Pongad Jr. |
| Councilors | Bryan Byrd B. Bellang |
| Councilors | Milagros N. Fang-asan |

== Culture ==
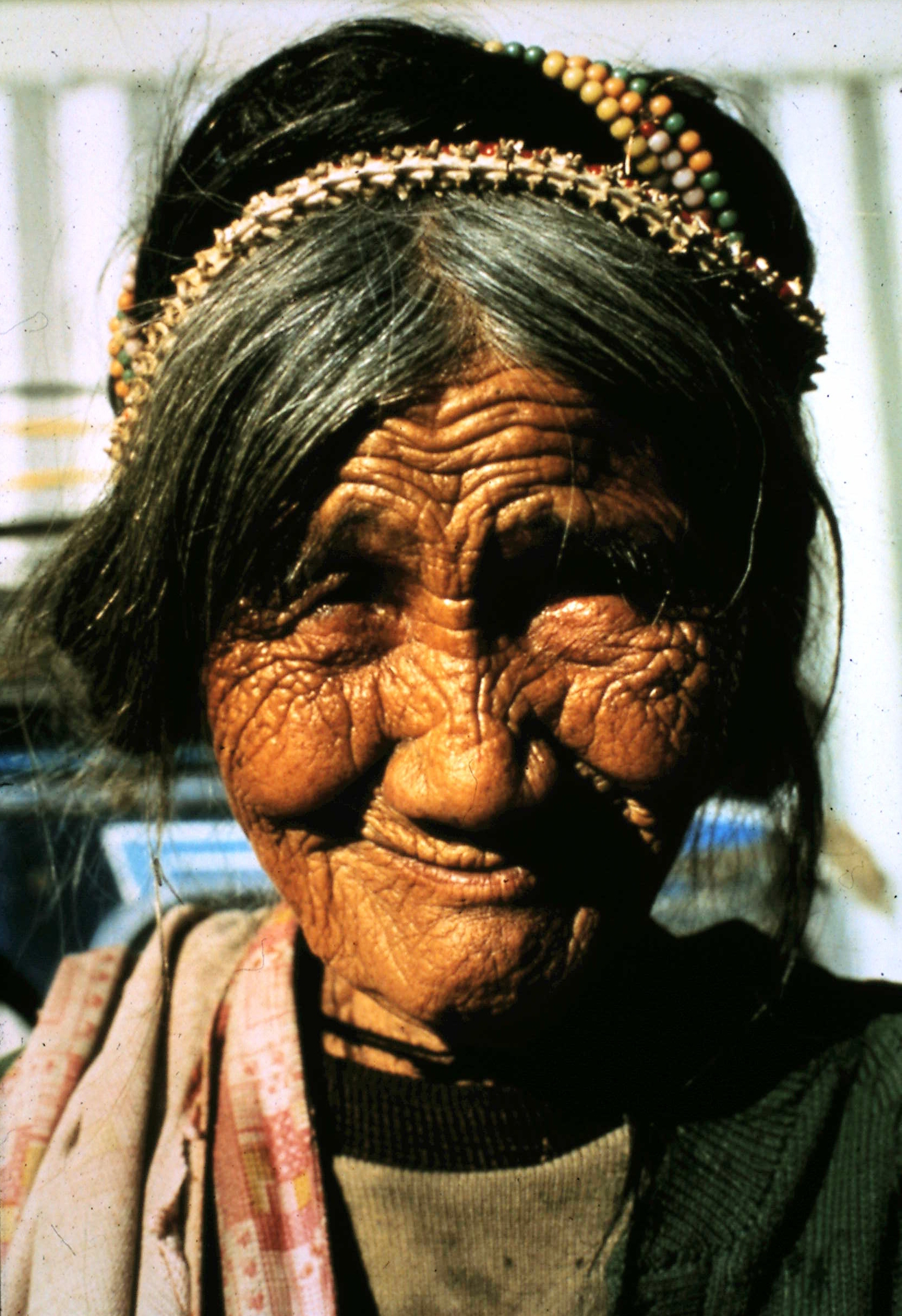
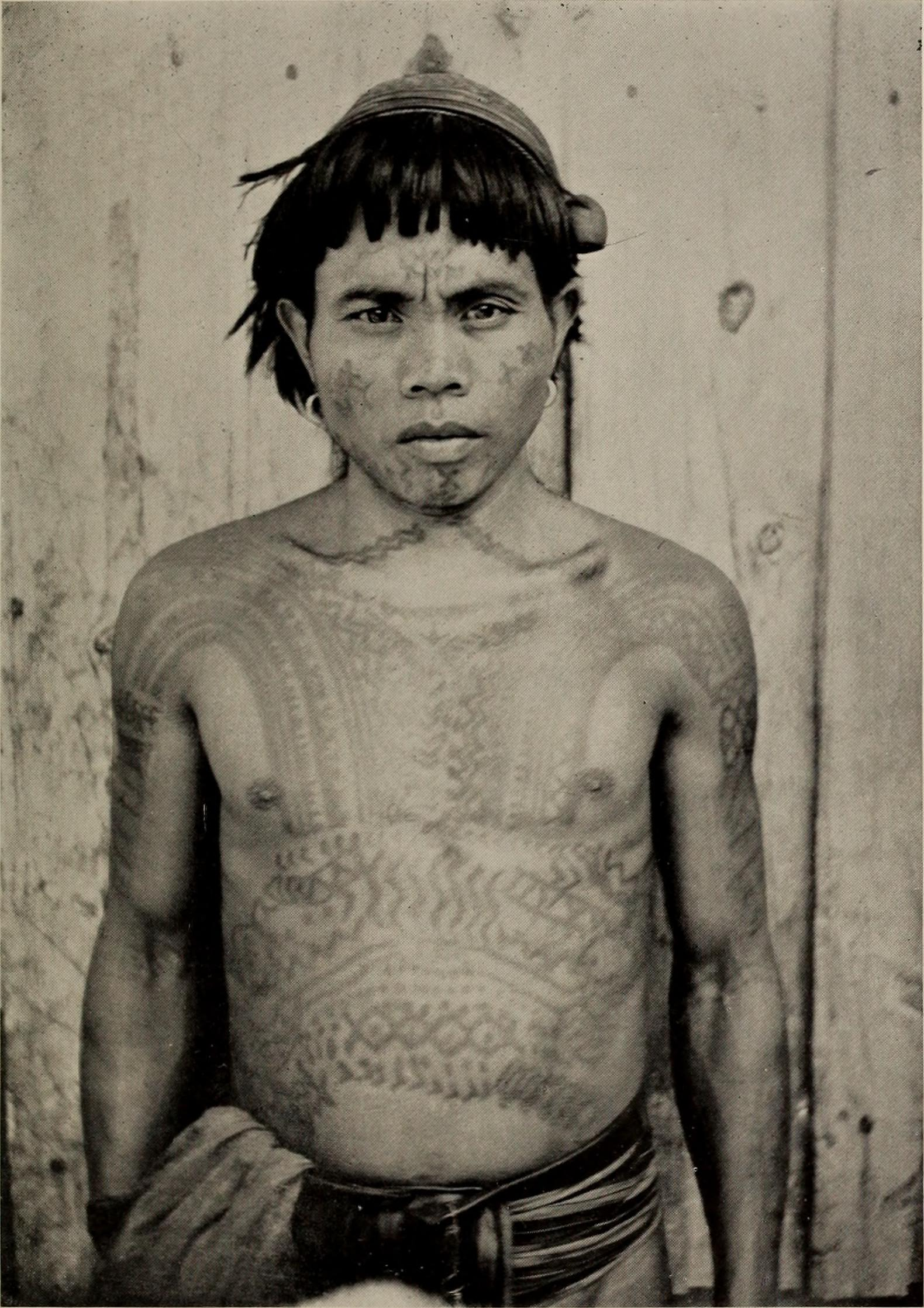
Bontoc woman with a snake skeleton in hair (a charm against lightning) and Bontoc man, c. 1903, (right)

Bontoc Museum

The highland town of Bontoc is home to two National Cultural Treasures of the Philippines. These are the Stone Agricultural Calendar of Bontoc and Petroglyphs of Alab.

The Alab petroglyphs are ancient figures carved on mountain walls by the prehistoric people of Bontoc. The petroglyphs are the most important ancient rock art carvings in the Cordilleras and the second oldest in the entire country, second only to the Angono petroglyphs of Rizal. Due to its high significance, it was submitted by the National Commission for Culture and the Arts of the Philippines to the UNESCO Tentative List of Heritage Sites in 2006, pending its inclusion in the World Heritage List along with the Singanapan charcoal-drawn petrographs of southern Palawan, Angono petroglyphs of Rizal province, charcoal-drawn Peñablanca petrographs of Cagayan, and the Anda red hermatite print petrographs of Bohol.

== Education ==
The Bontoc Schools District Office governs all educational institutions within the municipality. It oversees the management and operations of all private and public, from primary to secondary schools.

=== Primary and elementary schools ===
- Alab Elementary School
- All Saints' Mission School
- Balili Elementary School
- Bayyo Elementary school
- Bilig Elementary School
- Bontoc Central School
- Bontoc Ili Primary School
- Can-eo Elementary School
- Can-eo Chapyusen Multi Grade
- Dalican Elementary School
- Dantay Elementary School
- Gonogon Elementary School
- Guina-ang Elementary School
- Mainit Elementary School
- Maligcong Elementary School
- Mountain Province SPED Center
- Samoki Elementary School
- St. Vincent's School
- Talubin Elementary School
- Tocucan Elementary School
- Ut-Utan Elementary School

=== Secondary schools ===
- Albago National High School, Balili
- Dalican National High School, Dalican
- Guina-ang National High School, Guina-ang
- Mountain Province General Comprehensive High School, Poblacion
- Saint Vincent School, Poblacion
- Talubin National High School, Talubin
- Tocucan National High School, Tocucan

=== Technical and vocational school ===
- XiJen College of Mountain Province

=== Higher educational institution ===
- Mountain Province State University (Main campus)

== Notable people ==
- Lamberto V. Avellana - National Artist of the Philippines for Film
- Francisco Claver, SJ - Roman Catholic bishop, Jesuit, and human rights activist
