= Indigenous Peoples Rights International =

Human Rights organization

- Abbreviation: IPRI
- Formation: 2019
- Founders: Victoria Tauli Corpuz; Joan Carling
- Type: Nonprofit, NGO
- Headquarters: Baguio, Philippines
- Region served: Global
- Chair: Sandra Creamer
- Website: iprights.org

Indigenous Peoples Rights International (IPRI) is a global, registered non-profit Indigenous Peoples organization that works to protect the defenders of Indigenous peoples' rights as well as uniting and amplifying the call for justice and respect for them.

== Background ==
The organization was established in 2019 to address the rising global crisis of criminalization and violence committed against indigenous leaders. These acts include but not only limited to: imprisonment due to false charges, killings, displacements, land grabbing, and other human rights violations.

IPRI is governed by a Board of Directors, which consists of a number of people of Indigenous heritage from several different countries, including Canada, Australia, Sweden, Kenya, Colombia, Philippines, Russia and Indonesia. The day-to-day management of the organization is facilitated by the Global Secretariat.

A former United Nations (UN) Special Rapporteur on Indigenous Peoples Rights, Victoria Tauli Corpuz, and UN's Champions of the Earth Awardee, Joan Carling, are the founding leaders and current (2022) co-directors of IPRI. The Ecuadorian politician Mónica Chuji is a deputy director of Indigenous People Rights International.

== Activities ==
IPRI is leading the Global Initiative to Address and Prevent Criminalization, Violence, and Impunity Against Indigenous Peoples. IPRI's focus is on upholding Indigenous peoples' rights in business operations, reducing the criminalization of Indigenous peoples' rights in conservation measures, and reducing the incarceration of Indigenous people, including women and children. IPRI supports movement towards national reforms and international enforcement mechanisms that are needed to ensure Indigenous peoples' right to live on and defend their land is upheld. The main focus is on six countries where violence against Indigenous peoples is particularly serious: Brazil, Colombia, Democratic Republic of Congo, India, Mexico, Philippines.

IPRI works to:

- Bring global attention to local issues.
- Undertake activities in collaboration with Indigenous peoples and human rights organizations to address the situation of criminalization and impunity at national, regional and global levels.
- Network and partner with human rights, Indigenous peoples' organizations and alliances and relevant human rights institutions.
- Develop advocacy materials, including digests, to enhance awareness on Indigenous Peoples' Rights.

For example:

- In an open letter written in 2022, the president of Tanzania was addressed in and petitioned to stop the eviction of about 70,000 Maasai indigenous pastoralists and their livestock from their customary lands.
- In April 2021, the Colombian government was addressed in relation to the assassination of the indigenous leader of the Nasa people, Sandra Liliana Peña Chocué, in 2021.
- IN 2020, a letter was written to Elon Musk, Tesla, urging him to stop buying products from the company Nornickel, a company that destroys indigenous peoples' lands in Russian Siberia.

== Publications ==
- Annual Report on Criminalization, Violence, and Impunity against Indigenous Peoples, 27 April 2022
- Digest - Upholding Indigenous Peoples' Rights - Legislation and Jurisprudence: Global, Regional and National Developments, 27 April 2022
- Briefing: UNGPs and the protection of the rights of Indigenous Peoples in the context of business operations, 25 April 2022
