= Victoria Tauli-Corpuz =

Filipino development consultant and activist

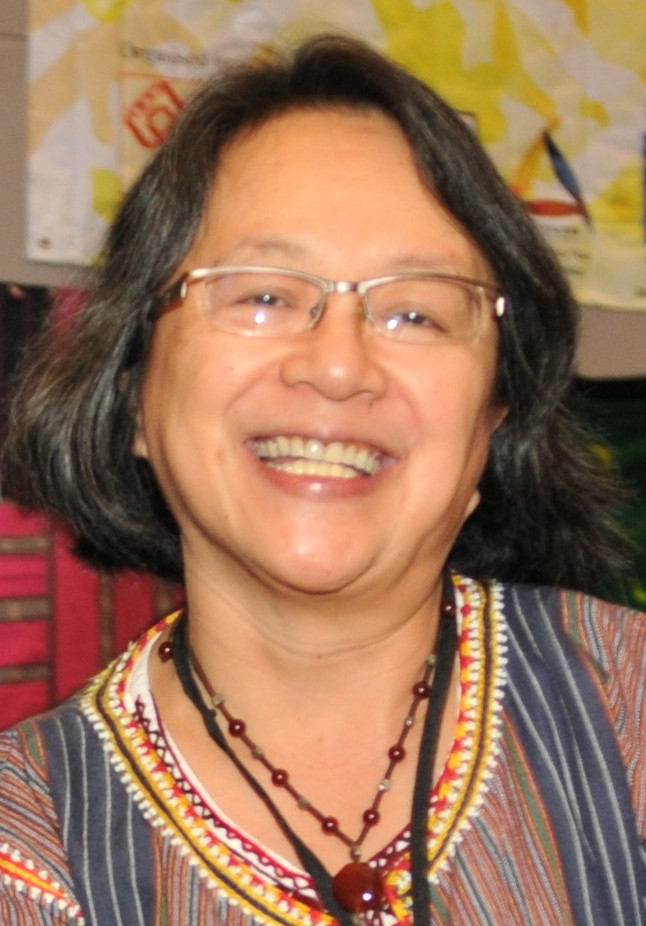

3rd United Nations Special Rapporteur on the Rights of Indigenous Peoples
- In office 2 June 2014 – 31 April 2020
- Preceded by: James Anaya (United States)
- Succeeded by: José Francisco Calí Tzay (Guatemala)

Chairperson, United Nations Permanent Forum on Indigenous Issues
- In office May 2005 – April 2010
- Preceded by: Ole Henrik Magga (Norway)
- Succeeded by: Carlos Mamani Condori (Peru)

Personal details
- Born: October 19, 1952 (age 73) Besao, Mt. Province, Philippines
- Education: University of the Philippines Manila
- Awards: Gabriela Silang Awards (2009)

Victoria Tauli-Corpuz is a Filipino development consultant and an international indigenous activist of Kankana-ey Igorot ethnicity. From 2014 to 2020, she served as the third United Nations Special Rapporteur on the Rights of Indigenous Peoples.

== Background ==
She graduated from the Philippine Science High School in Diliman, Quezon City in 1969. She completed her nursing degree at the UP College of Nursing, University of the Philippines Manila in 1976.

== Career ==
=== Activism ===
As an activist, she helped organize indigenous peoples on the community level to fight against the projects of then President Ferdinand Marcos. The indigenous peoples she organized helped stop the Chico River Hydroelectric Dam project, which would have inundated traditional villages, and the logging operations of Cellophil Resources Corporation on ancestral lands.

=== United Nations ===
Tauli-Corpuz has served as chairperson of the United Nations Permanent Forum on Indigenous Issues (2005–2010) and was the rapporteur for the Voluntary Fund for Indigenous Populations.

On 2 June 2014, she assumed responsibilities as the third UN Special Rapporteur on the Rights of Indigenous Peoples. As UN special rapporteur, she was tasked to investigate alleged violations of indigenous peoples rights and promote the implementation of international standards concerning the rights of indigenous peoples. She benefited from the support of the Ford Foundation through grants to the Tebtebba Foundation. She continued to hold her special rapporteur position until March 2020.

She is the indigenous and gender adviser to the Third World Network, a member of United Nations Development Programme Civil Society Organizations Advisory Committee and a member of the World Future Council.

Tauli-Corpuz is one of the founders of Indigenous Peoples Rights International and one of the current (2022) co-directors of the organisation.

== Recognition ==
Tauli-Corpuz was the first recipient of the Gabriela Silang Award, conferred in 2009 by the National Commission on Indigenous Peoples.

She was included in a list of ten people who had had important roles in scientific developments in 2021 compiled by the scientific journal Nature.

=== Nobel Prize nomination ===
In February 2023, together with the Ecuadorian activist Juan Carlos Jintiach, Tauli-Corpuz was included in PRIO Director Henrik Urdal's shortlist of 2023 Nobel Peace Prize worthy candidates "for their non-violent struggle to protect and strengthen the rights of indigenous peoples."

Human Rights Watch senior researcher in Asia, Carlos Conde, welcomed her inclusion in the Nobel Peace Prize shortlist, saying that harassment and enforced disappearances of Indigenous activists in the Philippines continues under Duterte's successor, Bongbong Marcos. "Her nomination alone will highlight the severe plight they have been experiencing and should prompt action by the international community," he said.
