= José Francisco Calí Tzay =

Guatemalan lawyer and diplomat

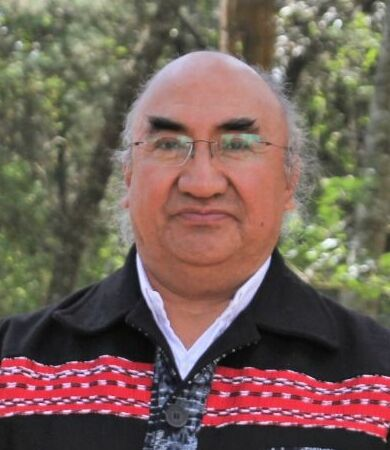
- José Francisco Calí Tzay (2023)

4th United Nations Special Rapporteur on the Rights of Indigenous Peoples
- Incumbent
- Assumed office 1 May 2020
- Preceded by: Victoria Tauli-Corpuz (Philippines)

Personal details
- Born: 27 September 1961 (age 63); Tecpán, Guatemala

José Francisco Calí Tzay (born 27 September 1961) is a Guatemalan attorney and diplomat, and the UN Human Rights Council Special Rapporteur on the Rights of Indigenous Peoples since 2020.

== Career ==
Francisco Cali was elected for four consecutive four-year terms to serve on the Committee on the Elimination of Racial Discrimination, a UN Treaty body, from 2004 to 2020. He was elected President of the Committee, and served a two year term in that capacity from 2014 to 2016. He was the first indigenous person elected to serve on a UN treaty body.

In the government of Guatemala, Francisco Cali served in a number of positions including, starting in 2016, Ambassador to Germany (also accredited to Poland and Ukraine) and, from 2008 to 2013, Director of Human Rights at the Ministry of Foreign Affairs.

He is a member of the faculty of the University of Arizona School of Law.

=== Work as special rapporteur ===
Francisco Cali assumed the post of UN Human Rights Council Special Rapporteur on the Rights of Indigenous Peoples in 2020, after the tenure of his predecessor, Victoria Tauli-Corpuz, ended on April 30 of that year. As UN special rapporteur, he is tasked to investigate alleged violations of indigenous peoples rights and promote the implementation of international standards concerning the rights of indigenous peoples.

In this capacity, he and David R. Boyd urged Sweden in early 2022 not to award a license to British company Beowulf Mining for the iron-ore Kallak mine in the Gallok region, home of the indigenous Sámi people, saying the open-pit mine would endanger the protected ecosystem and reindeer migration.

The CHR stated that the alleged pickup truck trailing surveillance of Tzay's team during his 31 July 2024 academic visit to the indigenous natives at Barangay Mabaca and Tabuk, Kalinga near Chico dam, was of deep concern.
