= Joan Carling =

Filipino environmental activist

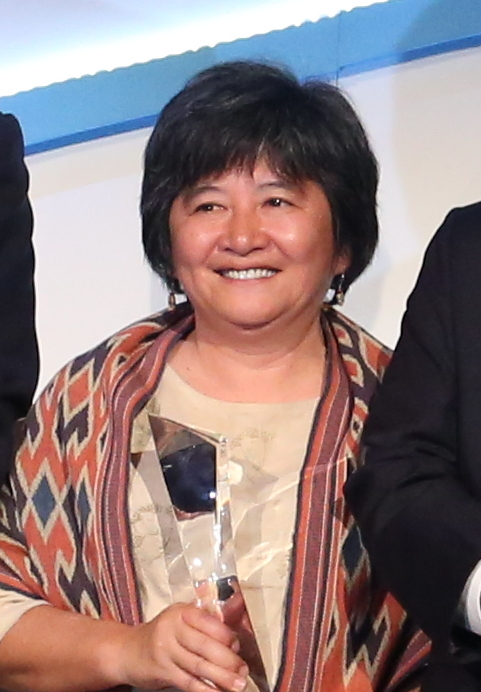
Joan Carling at the Champions of the Earth 2018 Award

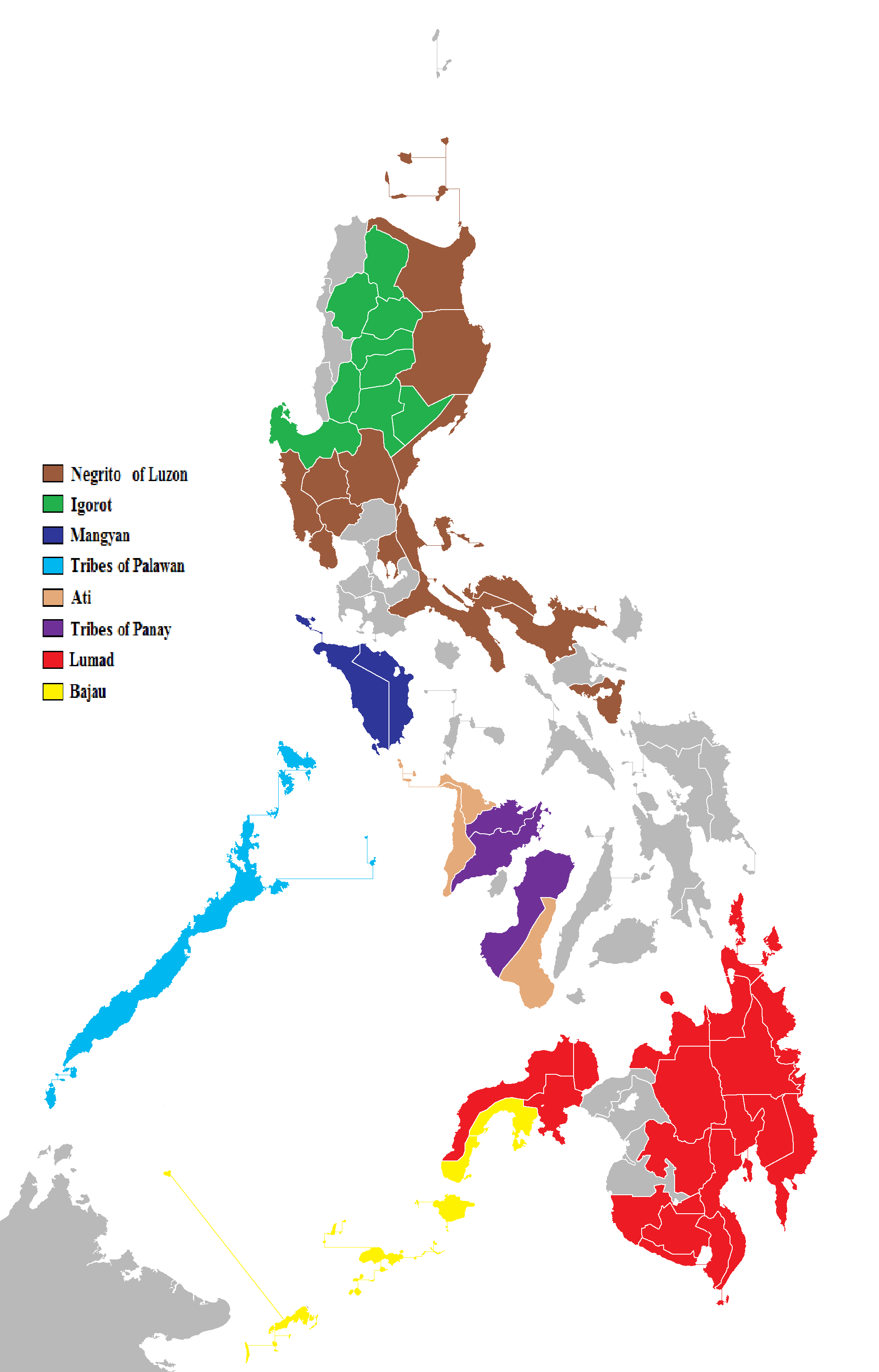
Indigenous peoples of the Philippines

Joan Carling (born 1963) is an indigenous Filipino human rights activist and environmentalist who has defended the rights of native and marginalized peoples for over two decades. She has served as Secretary General of the Asia Indigenous Peoples Pact (AIPP) and has chaired the Cordillera People's Alliance in the Philippines. Carling has also contributed to the United Nations Framework Convention on Climate Change and REDD+ activities and has served as a member of the United Nations Permanent Forum on Indigenous Issues (UNPFii). In September 2018 she received the Champions of the Earth Lifetime Achievement Award from the United Nations Environment Programme in recognition of her work as an environmentalist and a defender of human rights.

== Biography ==
Born on 30 June 1963 in Baguio, Joan Carling is the daughter of a half-Japanese, half-Kankanaey father and a Kankanaey mother. The Kankanaey people belonging to the Igorot group are based in the Mountain Province in the Cordillera Central mountain range. After completing high school, she studied social sciences at the UP College of Baguio, then an extension campus of the University of the Philippines Diliman, specializing in sociology. She graduated in 1986.

While still at college, in 1984 she was struck by the murder of Macli-ing Dulag who had been campaigning against the Chico River Dam Project in order to safeguard the native Kalinga people. After attending his memorial in Sadanga, for the next three years she joined in efforts towards community integration, becoming a human rights activist in Kalinga.

In 1989, while attending a conference on ethnocide and militarization in Mindanao, she was one of 16 delegates to be arrested on the grounds that they were members of the Communist New People's Army. After a number of protests, they were finally released. In 1998, she campaigned against the construction of the San Roque Dam. On returning to Baguio, she joined the Cordillera Peoples Alliance, becoming secretary general in 1997 and chair from 2003 to 2006.

From September 2008, she served for two periods as Secretary General of the AIPP, representing its 47-member organization. She has written and edited publications on human rights, climate change, forest conservation, sustainable development and indigenous women. From 2014 to 2016, she served as a member of the UNPFii. In 2014, she edited Her Story of Empowerment, Leadership and Justice on indigenous women in Asia, published by AIPP.

In her role as co-convener of the Indigenous Peoples Major Group on the Sustainable Development Goals, in February 2018 she was designated a terrorist by the Filipino authorities for an alleged connection with the Communist Party of the Philippines and the New People's Army.

In September 2018 she received the Champions of the Earth Lifetime Achievement Award from the United Nations Environment Programme in recognition of her work as an environmentalist and a defender of human rights.

In October 2024, she received The Right Livelihood Award for her ongoing and dedicated work concerning the rights of indigenous people.

== In popular culture ==
Carling was one of the Filipino women prominently featured in a tribute to female game changers at Irish rock band U2's 2019 Joshua Tree Tour during its Manila leg.
