= Sandra Creamer =

Human rights and Indigenous peoples activist

Sandra Jan Creamer
- Born: Mt Isa, Queensland, Australia
- Honours: Member of the Order of Australia (2019)

Sandra Jan Creamer AM is a lawyer and Indigenous peoples' rights advocate from Mt Isa in Queensland, Australia. As of 2022 she is also adjunct professor of Public Health at the University of Queensland.

== Early life and education ==
Sandra Jan Creamer is a Waanyi and Kalkadoon woman from Mt Isa, Queensland, Australia. She was raised by her father and 11 older siblings after losing her mother when she was a baby. She learned to read from her eldest sisters, who did not have the opportunity to go to high school.

She holds a Bachelor of Law degree from Deakin University Institute of Koorie Education (2012) and was admitted in 2020 as a lawyer.

== Career ==
Creamer's work has included lecturing, writing submissions and articles, and the development of programs.

Creamer worked as an Indigenous community liaison officer with Legal Aid Queensland, working with Indigenous women and children who were victims of crime, conducting legal information workshops and assisting in cases of racial discrimination and family law.

In 2015, Creamer attended the Human Rights Advocacy Program at the Columbia University in the City of New York. The program includes advocacy, networking, skills-building, and academic coursework, and provides advocates with the opportunity to hone practical skills, develop a deeper understanding of human rights, and foster mutually beneficial relationships with organizations and individuals in their fields.

Creamer taught in both the Tertiary Entry Program and undergraduate courses within the Office of Indigenous Engagement of the Central Queensland University (CQU) at Rockhampton. She also supported Aboriginal and Torres Strait Islander students studying Law at CQU as a casual Learning Advisor.

In 2018, Creamer became Adjunct Professor for Public Health at the Faculty of Medicine of the University of Queensland.

As of 2022 she is adjunct professor of Public Health at the University of Queensland.

== Roles ==
In 2013, Creamer was one of the Australian delegates participating in the United Nations Permanent Forum on Indigenous Issues and was the Co-Chair of the Global Indigenous Women's Caucus for the United Nations Permanent Forum on Indigenous Issues.

Creamer is the CEO of the National Aboriginal and Torres Strait Islander Women's Alliance and a board director for both Amnesty International Australia and the International Indigenous Women's Forum.

In 2021, Creamer became one of the 19 members of the National Plan Advisory Group established by the Australian Government to inform the development of the National Plan to end family, domestic and sexual violence in Australia.

She is a member of the Aboriginal and Torres Strait Islander Advisory Group established by the Queensland Human Rights Commission, a group of First Nations advocates with an interest in promoting the human rights of Aboriginal and Torres Strait Islander people in Queensland.

Creamer is chairperson of the board of directors of Indigenous Peoples Rights International (2022). She is also an advisor for the Seventh Generation Board Fund whose work is dedicated to Indigenous Peoples' self-determination and the sovereignty of Native nations.

Creamer has been a speaker at various conferences, including the STOP Domestic Violence Conference 2020 at the Gold Coast, Queensland, 2020, and the ANROWS (Australia's National Research Organisation for Women's Safety) National Research Conference on violence against women, held online in 2022. Her presentation at ANROWS had the topic: Evidence Presentation 2: Putting Aboriginal and Torres Strait Islander healing at the heart of trauma-informed policy and practice.

== Recognition ==
In 2019, Creamer was awarded the AM (Member of the Order of Australia) for her service to Indigenous women and to human rights.

== Personal life ==
Creamer's son Joshua Creamer is a barrister specialising in human rights cases, including wage theft from Indigenous Australians. His wife Kara Cook was elected to federal parliament in 2025.

== Publications ==
- Article in The Conversation: IPCC reports still exclude Indigenous voices. Come join us at our sacred fires to find answers to climate change
- Journal article: Five enablers to deliver safe water and effective sewage treatment to remote Indigenous communities in Australia
- Journal article: Water and health interlinkages of the sustainable development goals in remote Indigenous Australia
- Journal article: Receiving essential health services on country: Indigenous Australians, native title and the United Nations Declaration
- Journal article: Health's role in achieving Australia's Sustainable Development Goal commitments
