= United Nations Special Rapporteur on the Rights of Indigenous Peoples =

United Nations Special Rapporteur

- Emblem of the United Nations
- Incumbent; Albert Kwokwo Barume since 2024
- Inaugural holder: Rodolfo Stavenhagen
- Website: www.ohchr.org/en/special-procedures/sr-indigenous-peoples

The United Nations Special Rapporteur on the Rights of Indigenous Peoples is a special rapporteur appointed by the United Nations after a 2001 mandate of the United Nations Commission on Human Rights. The UN appointed Albert Kwokwo Barume to the position in December 2024. José Francisco Calí Tzay was appointed to the post in 2020 and resigned in 2024, succeeding Victoria Tauli-Corpuz who had been in post since 2014, following James Anaya.

== List of post-holders ==
List of post-holders
| Dates | Name | Nationality |
|---|---|---|
| 2024– | Albert Kwokwo Barume | Democratic Republic of the Congo |
| 2020–2024 | José Francisco Calí Tzay | Mayan Kaqchikel, Guatemala |
| 2014–2020 | Victoria Tauli-Corpuz | Kankanaey Igorot, Philippines |
| 2008–2014 | James Anaya | American |
| 2001–2008 | Rodolfo Stavenhagen | German-born Mexican |

== Annual reports ==
Every year, the Special Rapporteur will also present annual reports, usually on specific themes or issues important to the rights of indigenous peoples.

Annual reports
| Year | Themes | UN Symbol number |
|---|---|---|
| 2022 | "Indigenous women and the development, application, preservation and transmission of scientific and technical knowledge" | A/HRC/51/28 |
| 2021 | "Indigenous peoples and coronavirus disease (COVID-19) recovery" | A/HRC/48/54 |
| 2020 | "Mandate impacts in favour of the protection of the rights of indigenous peoples. Observations on consultation processes" | A/HRC/45/34 |
| 2019 | "Access to justice in ordinary and indigenous justice systems" | A/HRC/42/37 |
| 2018 | "Attacks and criminalization of indigenous human rights defenders. Availability of prevention and protection measures" | A/HRC/39/17 |
| 2017 | "Impacts of climate change and climate finance on indigenous peoples’ rights" | A/HRC/36/46 |
| 2016 | "International investment agreements, including bilateral investment treaties and investment chapters of free trade agreements" | A/HRC/33/42 |
| 2015 | "Rights of indigenous women and girls" | A/HRC/30/41 |
| 2014 | "Obstacles to the realization of indigenous peoples’ rights" | A/HRC/27/52 |
| 2013 | "Extractive Industries and Indigenous Peoples" | A/HRC/24/41 |
| 2012 | "Report of the Special Rapporteur on the rights of indigenous peoples" | A/HRC/21/47 |
| 2011 | "Extractive industries operating within or near indigenous territories" | A/HRC/18/35 |
| 2010 | "The situation of human rights and fundamental freedoms of indigenous people" | A/HRC/15/37 |
| 2009 | "Analysis of the duty of States to consult with indigenous peoples on matters affecting them: insight into how duty to consult may be addressed by Governments, indigenous peoples, the United Nations system, and other stakeholders." | A/HRC/12/34 |
| 2008 | "United Nations Declaration on the Rights of Indigenous Peoples: analysis in the context of other international instruments specifically regarding indigenous peoples and human rights instruments of general applicability; the different measures required to implement and make operative the rights affirmed in the Declaration; joint efforts by States, the United Nations system, indigenous peoples and relevant civil society actors." | A/HRC/9/9 |
| 2007 | "Recent trends concerning the situation of the rights of indigenous peoples of the world: recent norms and the implementation gap; the increased loss of lands; the impact of climate change; forest peoples; pastoralist peoples; peoples living in isolation; intellectual property rights; indigenous women; indigenous children; the future of the international protection of the rights of indigenous peoples." | A/HRC/4/32 |
