= Kalaleng =

Philippine nose flute

A kalaleng is a nose flute made from bamboo from the Philippines.

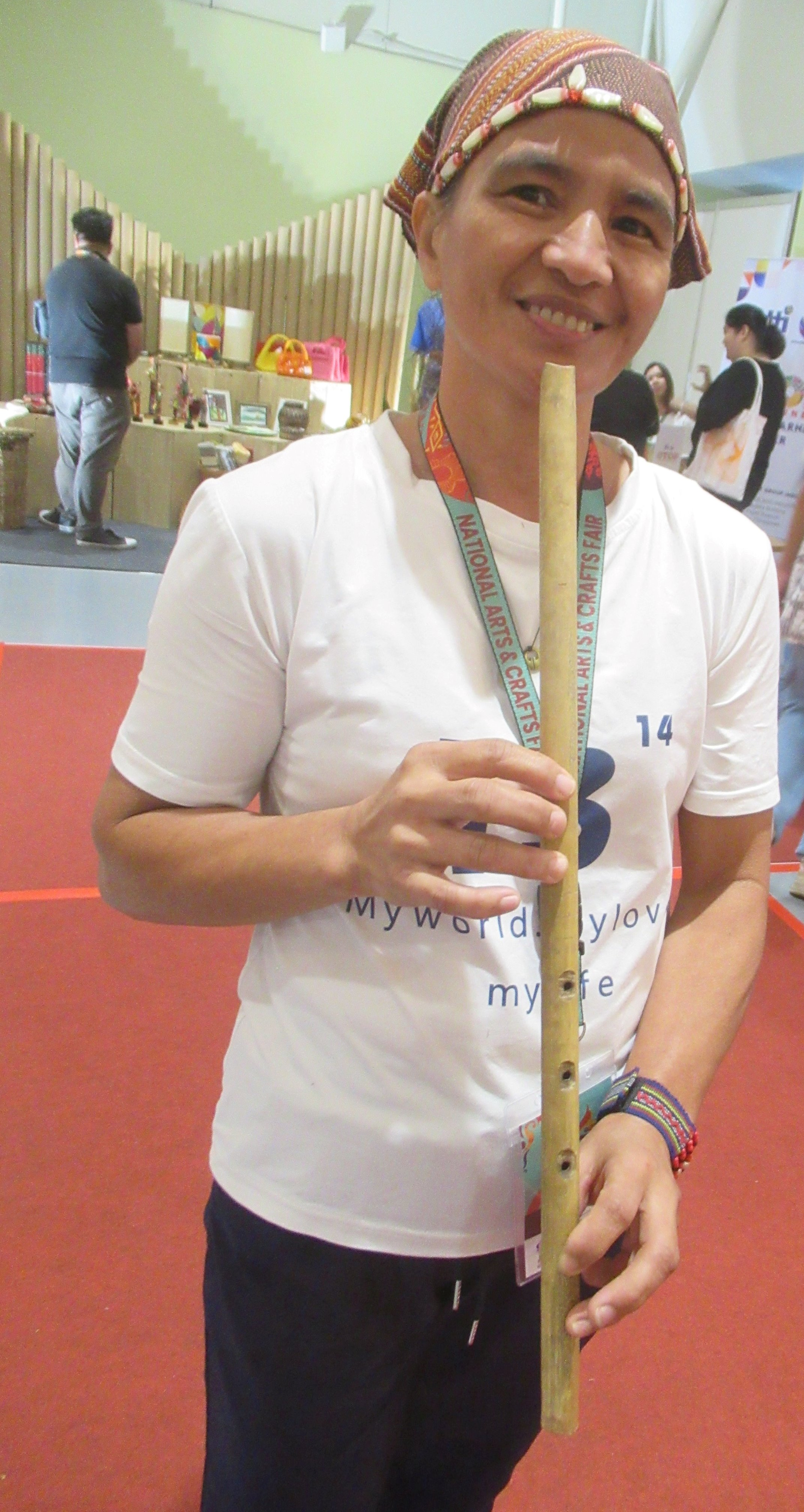
Tongali (Kalinga)

Usually around two feet in length. It has holes on the side, to be played by covering the holes with the fingers. The player closes one nostril with a bit of cotton, then forces the air from the other into a small hole cut in the end of the tube. This instrument is found mostly in the northern Philippines and is popular with all the native mountain population of the area. It is usually decorated with etched patterns.

The instrument is popular with men and is often used in courting.
