= Region I's at-large parliamentary district =

Former Philippine parliamentary district

- Former constituency for the Interim Batasang Pambansa

Former constituency
- Created: 1978
- Abolished: 1984
- Seats: 14

Region I's at-large parliamentary district (also known as Ilocos Region's at-large parliamentary district) was a constituency for the Interim Batasang Pambansa, the legislature of the Philippines from 1978 to 1984. It encompassed the provinces of Abra, Benguet, Ilocos Norte, Ilocos Sur, La Union, Mountain Province, and Pangasinan, together with the cities of Baguio, Laoag, Dagupan, and San Carlos.

The district had 14 seats in the assembly, all of which were held by members of the ruling party Kilusang Bagong Lipunan.

== List of assemblymen representing the district ==
=== Batasang Pambansa (1978–1986) ===
| Portrait | Member (Lifespan) (Province/City) | Term of office | Party | Legislature | Electoral history | Constituencies |
|---|---|---|---|---|---|---|
District established February 7, 1978.
| | Jose Aspiras (1924–1999) (La Union) | June 12, 1978 – June 30, 1984 | KBL | Interim Batasang Pambansa | Elected in 1978. | 1978–1984; Provinces: Abra, Benguet, Ilocos Norte, Ilocos Sur, La Union, Mountain Province, Pangasinan Cities: Baguio, Laoag, Dagupan, San Carlos |
| | Salacnib Baterina (1935–2025) (Ilocos Sur) | June 12, 1978 – June 30, 1984 | KBL | Interim Batasang Pambansa | Elected in 1978. | 1978–1984; Provinces: Abra, Benguet, Ilocos Norte, Ilocos Sur, La Union, Mountain Province, Pangasinan Cities: Baguio, Laoag, Dagupan, San Carlos |
| | Lucas Cauton (Ilocos Sur) | June 12, 1978 – June 30, 1984 | KBL | Interim Batasang Pambansa | Elected in 1978. | 1978–1984; Provinces: Abra, Benguet, Ilocos Norte, Ilocos Sur, La Union, Mountain Province, Pangasinan Cities: Baguio, Laoag, Dagupan, San Carlos |
| | Andres Cosalan (1927–2013) (Baguio City) | June 12, 1978 – June 30, 1984 | KBL | Interim Batasang Pambansa | Elected in 1978. | 1978–1984; Provinces: Abra, Benguet, Ilocos Norte, Ilocos Sur, La Union, Mountain Province, Pangasinan Cities: Baguio, Laoag, Dagupan, San Carlos |
| | Roque de Guzman (Pangasinan) | June 12, 1978 – June 30, 1984 | KBL | Interim Batasang Pambansa | Elected in 1978. | 1978–1984; Provinces: Abra, Benguet, Ilocos Norte, Ilocos Sur, La Union, Mountain Province, Pangasinan Cities: Baguio, Laoag, Dagupan, San Carlos |
| | Felipe de Vera (Pangasinan) | June 12, 1978 – June 30, 1984 | KBL | Interim Batasang Pambansa | Elected in 1978. | 1978–1984; Provinces: Abra, Benguet, Ilocos Norte, Ilocos Sur, La Union, Mountain Province, Pangasinan Cities: Baguio, Laoag, Dagupan, San Carlos |
| | Victor Dominguez (1935–2008) (Mountain Province) | June 12, 1978 – June 30, 1984 | KBL | Interim Batasang Pambansa | Elected in 1978. | 1978–1984; Provinces: Abra, Benguet, Ilocos Norte, Ilocos Sur, La Union, Mountain Province, Pangasinan Cities: Baguio, Laoag, Dagupan, San Carlos |
| | Conrado Estrella Sr. (1917–2011) (Pangasinan) | June 12, 1978 – June 30, 1984 | KBL | Interim Batasang Pambansa | Elected in 1978. | 1978–1984; Provinces: Abra, Benguet, Ilocos Norte, Ilocos Sur, La Union, Mountain Province, Pangasinan Cities: Baguio, Laoag, Dagupan, San Carlos |
| | Vicente Millora (1933–2020) (Pangasinan) | June 12, 1978 – June 30, 1984 | KBL | Interim Batasang Pambansa | Elected in 1978. | 1978–1984; Provinces: Abra, Benguet, Ilocos Norte, Ilocos Sur, La Union, Mountain Province, Pangasinan Cities: Baguio, Laoag, Dagupan, San Carlos |
| | Jeremias Montemayor (1923–2002) (Pangasinan) | June 12, 1978 – June 30, 1984 | KBL | Interim Batasang Pambansa | Elected in 1978. | 1978–1984; Provinces: Abra, Benguet, Ilocos Norte, Ilocos Sur, La Union, Mountain Province, Pangasinan Cities: Baguio, Laoag, Dagupan, San Carlos |
| | Joaquin L. Ortega (1916–1996) (La Union) | June 12, 1978 – June 30, 1984 | KBL | Interim Batasang Pambansa | Elected in 1978. | 1978–1984; Provinces: Abra, Benguet, Ilocos Norte, Ilocos Sur, La Union, Mountain Province, Pangasinan Cities: Baguio, Laoag, Dagupan, San Carlos |
| | Antonio Raquiza (1908–1999) (Ilocos Norte) | June 12, 1978 – June 30, 1984 | KBL | Interim Batasang Pambansa | Elected in 1978. | 1978–1984; Provinces: Abra, Benguet, Ilocos Norte, Ilocos Sur, La Union, Mountain Province, Pangasinan Cities: Baguio, Laoag, Dagupan, San Carlos |
| | Antonio Villar (Pangasinan) | June 12, 1978 – June 30, 1984 | KBL | Interim Batasang Pambansa | Elected in 1978. | 1978–1984; Provinces: Abra, Benguet, Ilocos Norte, Ilocos Sur, La Union, Mountain Province, Pangasinan Cities: Baguio, Laoag, Dagupan, San Carlos |
| | Jeremias Zapata (Abra) | June 12, 1978 – June 30, 1984 | KBL | Interim Batasang Pambansa | Elected in 1978. | 1978–1984; Provinces: Abra, Benguet, Ilocos Norte, Ilocos Sur, La Union, Mountain Province, Pangasinan Cities: Baguio, Laoag, Dagupan, San Carlos |
District dissolved into Abra's at-large, Baguio's at-large, Benguet's at-large, Ilocos Norte's at-large, Ilocos Sur's at-large, La Union's at-large, Mountain Province's at-large, and Pangasinan's at-large districts for the Regular Batasang Pambansa.

== Election results ==
=== 1978 ===
| Candidate | Party | Votes | % |
|---|---|---|---|
| Conrado Estrella Sr. | KBL | 1,336,732 | 7.74 |
| Jose Aspiras | KBL | 1,257,805 | 7.28 |
| Felipe De Vera | KBL | 1,229,307 | 7.12 |
| Vicente Millora | KBL | 1,227,538 | 7.11 |
| Antonio Villar Sr. | KBL | 1,220,650 | 7.07 |
| Roque De Guzman | KBL | 1,213,596 | 7.03 |
| Jeremias Montemayor | KBL | 1,186,245 | 6.87 |
| Antonio Raquiza | KBL | 1,175,134 | 6.80 |
| Andres Cosalan | KBL | 1,158,006 | 6.70 |
| Victor Dominguez | KBL | 1,145,314 | 6.63 |
| Salacnib Baterina | KBL | 1,139,117 | 6.59 |
| Lucas Cauton | KBL | 1,138,601 | 6.59 |
| Joaquin L. Ortega | KBL | 1,136,555 | 6.58 |
| Jeremias Zapata | KBL | 1,125,474 | 6.52 |
| Juan Primicias | Independent | 89,376 | 0.52 |
| Pedro Peralta | Independent | 67,701 | 0.39 |
| Julius Magno | Confederation of Ilocano Associations | 55,265 | 0.32 |
| Galleazzo Bucaycay | Independent | 53,594 | 0.31 |
| Joaquin T. Ortega | Independent | 48,946 | 0.28 |
| Glory Fernandez | Independent | 32,048 | 0.19 |
| Jehoven Quetulio | Independent | 30,145 | 0.17 |
| Constante Pimentel | Independent | 28,420 | 0.16 |
| Benito Valdez | Independent | 23,400 | 0.14 |
| Eusebio Agonias | Independent | 23,379 | 0.14 |
| Eubegildo Binongcal | Independent | 17,777 | 0.10 |
| Ernesto Antolin | Independent | 16,647 | 0.10 |
| Macario Valdez | Independent | 16,040 | 0.09 |
| Antonio Castro | Independent | 15,474 | 0.09 |
| Ciriaco del Amor | Independent | 14,895 | 0.09 |
| Cesar Vistro | Independent | 14,747 | 0.09 |
| Amparo Andrada | Emancipated Scientists Party | 11,926 | 0.07 |
| Samson Blancas Jr. | Independent | 11,672 | 0.07 |
| Sergio Tabuga | Emancipated Scientists Party | 5,852 | 0.03 |
| Amschel Noel Maria Roth-Mortel | Independent | 5,577 | 0.03 |
| Total | | 17,272,955 | 100.00 |
| Total votes | | 1,487,260 | – |
| Registered voters/turnout | | 1,639,523 | 90.71 |
