= Ramon P. Mitra =

Filipino lawyer and politician (1899–1978)

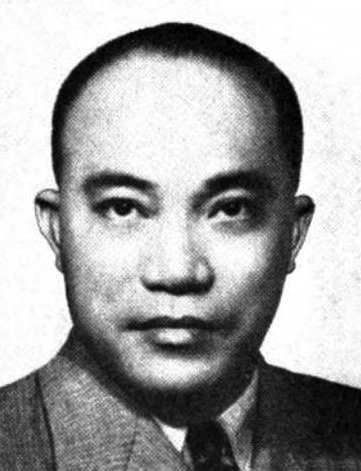
- Mitra's official portrait during the 3rd Congress

Member of the Philippine House of Representatives for Mountain Province's 2nd district
- In office September 25, 1951 – December 30, 1965
- Preceded by: Dennis Molintas
- Succeeded by: Andres Cosalan
- In office June 9, 1945 – May 25, 1946
- Preceded by: Himself (in the Commonwealth National Assembly)
- Succeeded by: Jose Mencio

Member of the National Assembly of the Philippines for Mountain Province's 2nd district
- In office December 30, 1938 – December 30, 1941
- Period: Commonwealth
- Preceded by: Felipe E. Jose
- Succeeded by: District abolished (seat later held by himself in 1945)

Mayor of Baguio
- In office May 4, 1944 – March 17, 1945
- Preceded by: Nicasio Valderrosa
- Succeeded by: Isidoro Siapno

Personal details
- Born: Ramon Pablo Mitra y Mariño; January 15, 1899 Lemery, Batangas, Captaincy General of the Philippines
- Died: February 6, 1978 (aged 79)
- Party: Nacionalista (1938–1941; 1945–1953; 1957–1978)
- Other political affiliations: Democratic (1953–1957); KALIBAPI (1943–1945)
- Spouse: Salud Ocampo
- Children: 6, including Ramon Jr.

Ramon Pablo Mitra y Mariño (January 15, 1899 – February 6, 1978) was a Filipino lawyer and politician who served as a member of the Philippine House of Representatives for Mountain Province's 2nd congressional district from 1945 to 1946 and 1951 to 1965, and as a member of the National Assembly during the Commonwealth period, representing the same district from 1938 to 1941. He briefly served as mayor of the city of Baguio from 1944 to 1945.

== Early life and education ==
Mitra was born on January 15, 1899, in Lemery, Batangas, as the tenth of 12 children of Ramon Marella Mitra and Josefa Mariño. He attended Tondo Elementary School for his primary education, where he graduated as class valedictorian in 1915. He went to the Association Institute High School for his secondary education, graduating in 1919. Mitra later studied at the University of Manila, where he earned his Bachelor of Laws degree in 1923 and passed the Bar examinations in the same year. He pursued advanced legal studies at the University of Santo Tomas, where he earned his Master of Laws degree in 1939 and Doctor of Civil Law degree in 1940.

== Career ==
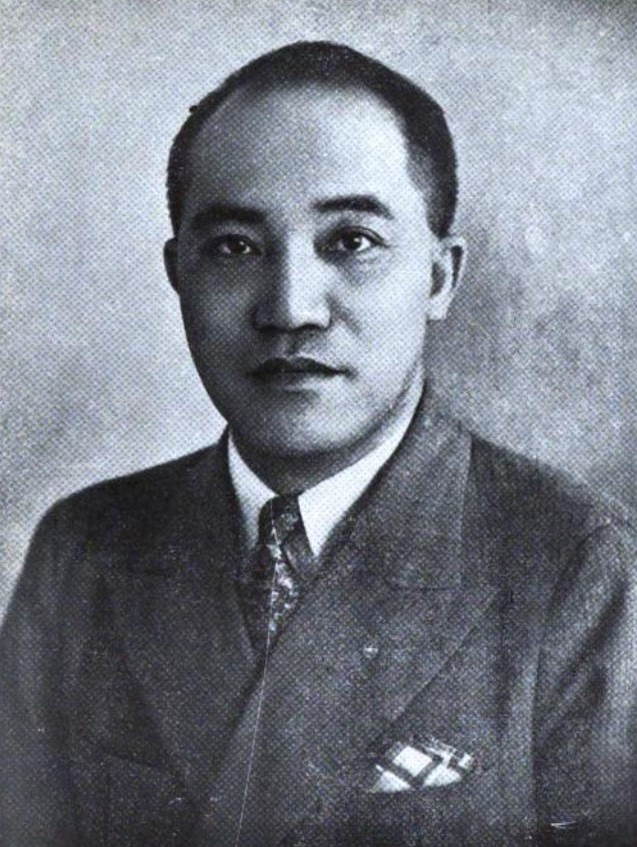
Photograph from The Commercial & Industrial Manual of the Philippines, 1941

Mitra began his career as a clerk in the Bureau of Agriculture during his college years from 1915 to 1917. He later worked as a bookkeeper and disbursing officer in the National Guard from 1917 to 1920, before becoming the chief accountant of the Bureau of Prisons in 1921.

By 1928, Mitra had been serving as superintendent of the Iwahig Penal Colony in Palawan and the San Ramon Penal Farm in Zamboanga, when he was appointed a delegate from the Philippines to the International Prisons' Convention in Kansas, the only delegate from Asia. It was also in the same year that he was admitted to the United States Court of Appeals in Washington, D.C., and the U.S. Court of Claims. He was later admitted to practice before the U.S. Supreme Court. Mitra and his family moved to Baguio in 1933, where he practiced law, becoming a lead practitioner.

His first foray into politics came in 1938, when he successfully ran as a candidate for Mountain Province's 2nd district in the National Assembly under the Nacionalista Party, where he served as president of its local chapter in Baguio and the sub-province of Benguet. In his first term as a legislator, he principally authored the bill that would later create Quezon City in 1939 through Commonwealth Act No. 502. He was also the first lawmaker from Mountain Province to chair a committee, after being elected to the assembly's government reorganization committee upon the proposal of floor leader Quintín Paredes.

He was reelected in 1941, but was not able to serve his term following the Japanese invasion, with representatives able to formally assume office in 1945. On May 3, 1944, President Jose P. Laurel appointed him mayor of Baguio, where he served until the time of liberation, when he returned to his law practice and served as a faculty member of the Manila Law College.

Mitra sought a new term as the district's representative in 1949, this time in the House of Representatives, but lost to Liberal Party candidate Dennis Molintas. Molintas's election was later annulled by the House Electoral Tribunal in 1951 after it granted Mitra's electoral protest, with Mitra assuming office in September 1951. In 1953, he won under the Democratic Party, only to rejoin the Nacionalista Party in 1957 to serve his fourth legislative term. He was elected to a fifth and final term in 1961, before retiring from public office.

== Personal life ==
Mitra was married to Salud Ocampo and had six children. His eldest child, Ramon Mitra Jr., was born to Purificacion Villarosa, whom he met at the Iwahig Penal Colony. Ramon Jr. later became a representative in 1965, a senator in 1971, and eventually speaker of the House in 1987.

Mitra died on February 6, 1978.

House of Representatives of the Philippines
Preceded by Dennis Molintas	Member of the Philippine House of Representatives for Mountain Province's 2nd district 1951–1965	Succeeded by Andres Cosalan
Preceded by Himself (in the Commonwealth National Assembly)	Member of the Philippine House of Representatives for Mountain Province's 2nd district 1945–1946	Succeeded by Jose Mencio
Preceded by Felipe E. Jose	Member of the National Assembly of the Philippines for Mountain Province's 2nd district 1938–1941	Vacant District dissolved into Mountain Province's at-large district Title next held by Himself (in the House of Representatives)
Political offices
Preceded by Nicasio Valderrosa	Mayor of Baguio; 1944–1945	Succeeded by Isidoro Siapno
