= Andres Cosalan =

Filipino lawyer and politician (1927–2013)

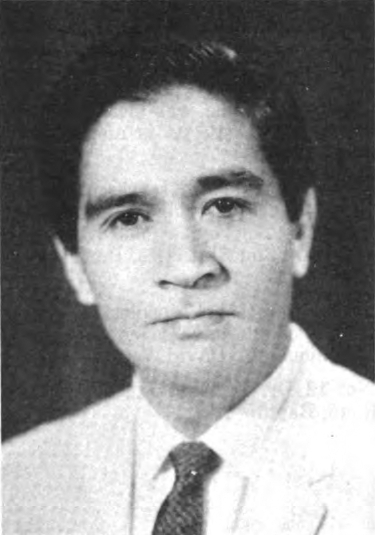
- Cosalan in the 6th Congress

Member of the Batasang Pambansa for Region I's at-large district
- In office June 12, 1978 – June 30, 1984 Serving with several others

Member of the Philippine House of Representatives
- In office December 30, 1969 – January 17, 1973
- Preceded by: District created
- Succeeded by: District abolished (seat later held by Samuel Dangwa in 1984)
- Constituency: Benguet's at-large district
- In office December 30, 1965 – December 30, 1969
- Preceded by: Ramon P. Mitra
- Succeeded by: District abolished
- Constituency: Mountain Province's 2nd district

Personal details
- Born: Magellan Acop Cosalan; June 26, 1927 Tublay, Mountain Province, Philippine Islands
- Died: September 9, 2013 (aged 86)
- Party: KBL (1978–1984)
- Other political affiliations: Nacionalista (1969–1978); Liberal (1965–1969)
- Spouse: Isabel Morales (m. 1952)
- Children: 7

Military service
- Allegiance: Philippines
- Branch/service: USAFIP-NL
- Rank: Sergeant

Andres Acop Cosalan Sr. (June 26, 1927 – September 9, 2013) was a Filipino lawyer, educator, and politician who served as a member of the Batasang Pambansa for Region I's at-large parliamentary district from 1978 to 1984. He previously served in the House of Representatives as a member for Mountain Province's 2nd congressional district from 1965 to 1969 and Benguet's at-large district from 1969 to 1973.

== Early life and education ==
Cosalan was born on June 26, 1927, in Tublay, Benguet, to Fernando Cosalan and Cecilia Acop. He was born with the first name Magellan, given to him by his older sisters, before being baptized at age 12 by a Belgian priest and given the Christian name Andres. He attended Tublay Elementary School for his primary education, where he graduated as class valedictorian. He went to Saint Louis High School in Baguio for his first two years in high school and finished his third and fourth year courses at Baguio High School. He later earned an associate in arts degree at Baguio Colleges and a bachelor of laws degree from the University of the Philippines. Cosalan passed the 1952 Bar examination with an 82.4% rating.

== Career ==
Cosalan began his career as a public school teacher at Acop Elementary School. After becoming a lawyer, he served as a law instructor at Saint Louis University in Baguio. During World War II, he served in the Northern Luzon guerrilla unit of the United States Army Forces in the Philippines (USAFIP-NL) as a sergeant.

After declining to run in 1957 and 1961, Cosalan finally sought election in 1965 for Mountain Province's 2nd congressional district in the House of Representatives under the Liberal Party due to public clamor. He defeated former Baguio mayor Luis Lardizabal, who was supported by outgoing representative Ramon P. Mitra and former provincial governor Bado Dangwa. He was reelected in 1969 under the Nacionalista Party, after the district was dissolved into the newly created Benguet's at-large district. His second term was cut short upon the imposition of martial law and subsequent abolition of Congress in 1973.

In 1978, Cosalan successfully ran for Region I's at-large district in the new parliament, the Batasang Pambansa, where he served until 1984. During the Marcos administration, he also served as minister of cultural minorities.

== Personal life and legacy ==
Cosalan married Isabel Morales on April 21, 1952, with whom he had seven children, including Ronald Cosalan, who was later elected representative of Benguet in 1995. He died on September 9, 2013, of a heart attack. He was buried in his hometown of Tublay.

The Congressman Andres Acop Cosalan Road, formerly known as the Gurel–Bokod–Kabayan–Buguias–Abatan Road, was renamed in his honor in 2018 upon the enactment of Republic Act No. 11061.

House of Representatives of the Philippines
New district	Member of the Batasang Pambansa from Region I 1978–1984; With: several others	District abolished
New district	Member of the Philippine House of Representatives for Benguet's at-large district 1969–1973	Vacant Martial law and adoption of the 1973 Constitution Title next held by Samuel Dangwa (in the Batasang Pambansa)
Preceded by Ramon P. Mitra	Member of the Philippine House of Representatives for Mountain Province's 2nd district 1965–1969	District abolished
