= Hilary Clapp =

Filipino doctor and politician

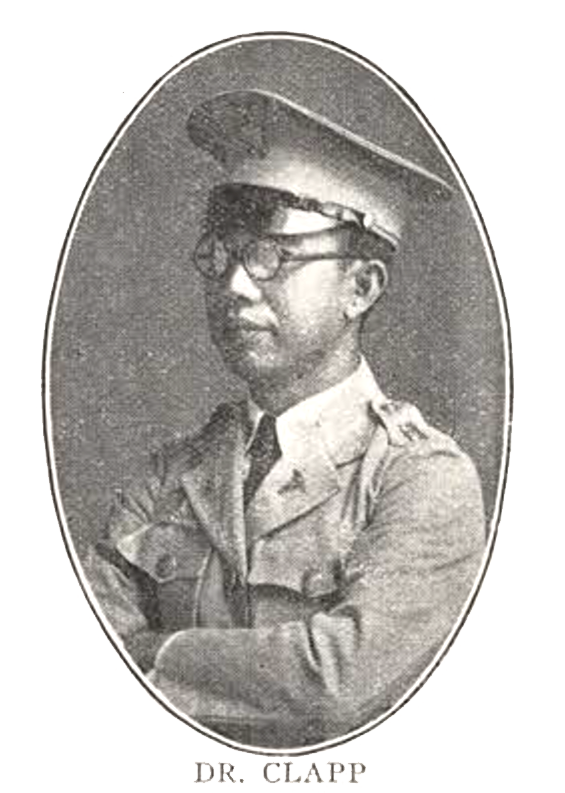

Member of the National Assembly from Mountain Province
- Ex officio
- In office September 25, 1943 – February 2, 1944 Serving with Florencio Bagwan

Member of the House of Representatives from Mountain Province's Lone District
- In office June 2, 1931 – June 5, 1934 Serving with Juan Gaerlan and Henry Kamora
- Preceded by: Clement F. Irving
- Succeeded by: Emiliano Aguirre

Personal details
- Born: Pit-a-pit; 1897 Bontoc, Philippines
- Died: April 1945 (aged 47–48)
- Citizenship: Filipino
- Party: KALIBAPI (1942–1945); Nacionalista (1931–1934)
- Education: University of the Philippines Manila
- Known for: First Igorot to serve in the Philippine legislature

Hilary Pit-a-pit Clapp (Bontoc: Pit-a-pit, lit. 'Igorot boy'; 1897 – April 1945) was a Filipino doctor and politician from Bontoc, Mountain Province, Philippines. He was an early convert of the Protestant American missions. He was one of the first Filipinos to arrive in Ontario, Canada. When he returned to the Philippines, he rose to prominence due to his education and connection to colonial officials. He became a doctor, the Igorot representative to the Philippine Commonwealth in the 1930s, and then the first Igorot governor of Mountain Province during the Japanese occupation.

== Biography ==
=== Early life ===
Pit-a-pit was born to the Bontoc, who reside near the Chico River basin in the mountainous region of the Cordillera, during the Spanish colonial era. In the late 1890s, when the Philippines was ceded by Spain to the United States, Protestantism started to take roots in northern Luzon highlands with the arrival American missionaries. It was in this context that he became one of the first Protestant converts among the Bontoc people.

He was raised under the tutelage of Walter Clayton Clapp, an Episcopalian priest who volunteered to be a missionary to the Philippines. Upon arrival in Manila in 1901, the priest was sent by Bishop Charles Brent to "look over the field among the Igorots of Northern Luzon." In 1903, in the province of Lepanto-Bontoc, the missionary took up residence and met Pit-a-pit. During that time, the Igorot boy formed a special bond with the priest who was then working in translation work for a dictionary of the Bontoc language.

Clapp described Pit-a-pit was “a singularly attractive and sprightly little fellow, quite innocent of clothing except a loin-cloth and a little soklong, or cap, woven of line rattan fibers, ornamented with dog-teeth and horse hair plumes, on the back of his long, flowing black hair.” He was later adopted by the priest and gave him the name Hilary Clapp.

=== Education ===
He received his early education in the Bontoc missions and school in Baguio, which was becoming the new regional centre of the American colonial outpost in northern Luzon. In 1906, he entered the Easter School, an all-boys private school established by the American missionaries, with fellow Bontoc students. Clapp was taught how to become "a good Christian and good patriot." As a student, he excelled in his studies, showing characteristics of perseverance and intelligence. He was chosen by the Episcopal missions to study abroad and to prepare him for becoming a priest.

Canada-born American Bishop Charles Henry Brent himself brought the young Igorot to Trinity College School, where Brent also studied. In September 1907, they left Manila for London and stayed in Dorchester House. Then from the Port of Liverpool, they travelled to New York and proceeded to the town of Port Hope in Ontario. He displayed skills in learning languages and competitive sports. However, he didn't find interested in ordained ministry. In 1910, Bishop Brent brought him back to the Philippines.

Clapp pursued to study medicine at the University of the Philippines after graduating from Manila High School. He interned in St. Luke's Hospital in Manila. In 1922, he returned to his hometown of Bontoc, where he was married to a nurse and had children. In 1924, he became a resident physician at the Bontoc General Hospital. There, he was appointed district officer serving for 13 years. Within the local community, he became a prominent leader due to his Western education and connection to colonial officials.

=== Political career ===
In 1931, Clapp was appointed as one of the two representatives of Mountain Province in the new Philippine Legislature. He championed the interests of his people.

"You are all mountaineers and I am a mountaineer, so we will understand each other. We don't know much about giving commencement addresses and much less about oratory. In our little corner of the Philippine Islands, we shall have just a plain straight talk this morning... We should try to help and encourage each other. We are only very few with the advantage of education so we cannot afford to be kicking each other or biting each other. But if we stick together and pull together, we can do much to improve ourselves and help our people."

== Death ==
When the Second World War broke, Dr. Clapp was offered the governorship under the civilian government reorganized by the Japanese Imperial Army. He then became the first Igorot governor of Mountain Province. From late 1944 to early 1945, U.S. forces went on a campaign to regain control of the archipelago. Meanwhile, Filipino resistance was concentrated in the mountains. As governor, Clapp worked secretly with the guerilla groups and American missionaries in hiding in order to protect his people. But, he was still labeled by some as a collaborator and traitor.

== Portrayals ==
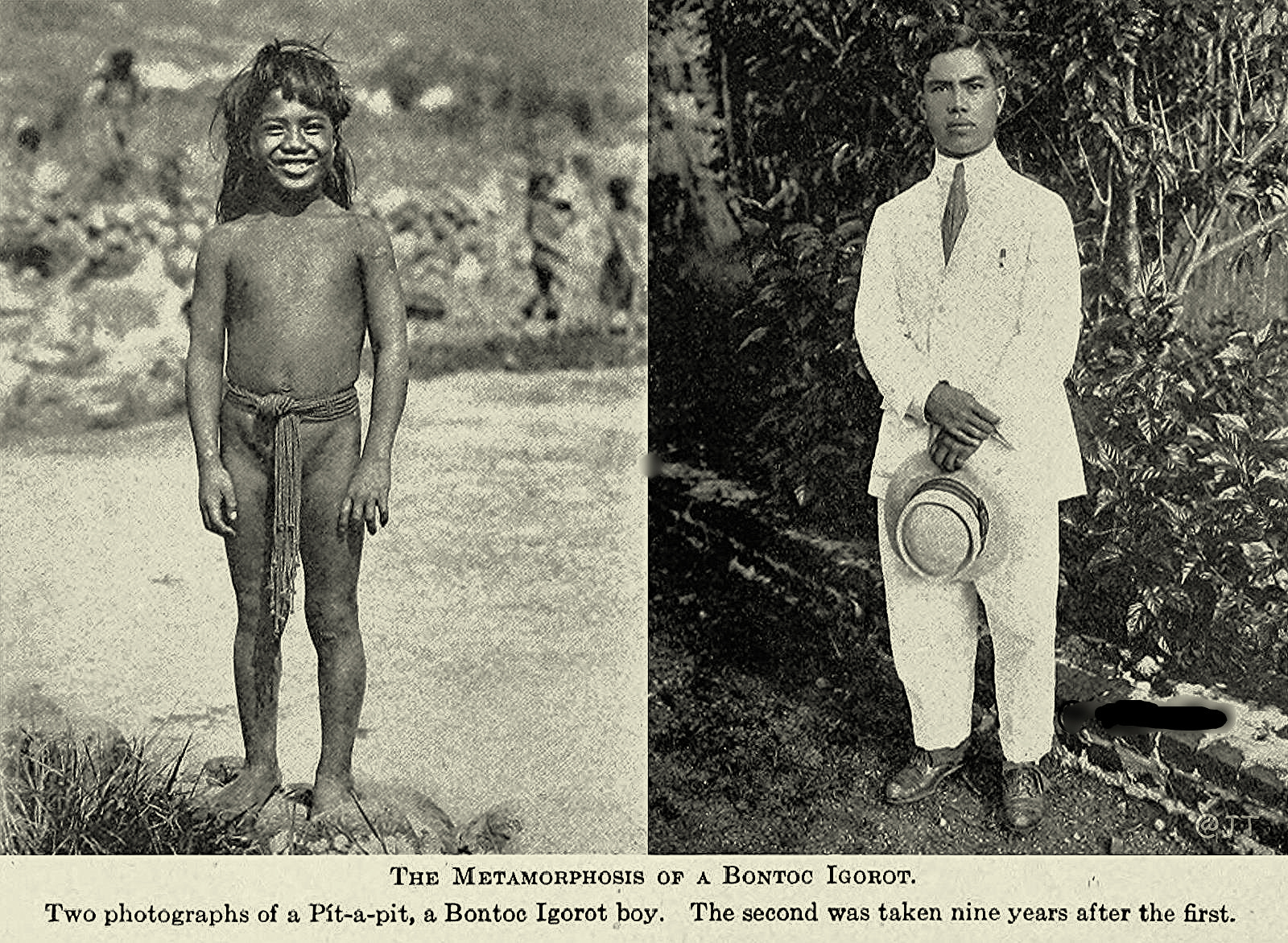
Title page and frontispiece, Dean Worcester, The Philippines Past and Present (1914)

Clapp is the subject of several works of art including a 1972 acrylic painting by National Artist Benedicto Cabrera titled Pit-a-pit's Metamorphosis.

Early black-and-white image of Pit-a-pit as a long-haired naked boy beside an image of him as an adult in a suit with a skimmer hat was widely circulated during the American colonial regime. They first appeared in the 1914 book “The Philippines Past and Present." The caption of the title page and frontispiece reads: "The Metamorphosis of a Bontoc Igorot. Two photographs of Pit-a-pit, a Bontoc Igorot boy. The second was taken nine years after the first."

Dean Worcester, American zoologist turned Secretary of the Interior in the Philippines, produced this sequence of portraits to generate the fantasy of radical transformation from a “savage” to "civilized." Critics claim that this practice was to justify colonial rule.

Posthumously, Telephone Time, an American TV drama series, featured a biographical profile of him in a June 1957 episode.
