= Pangasinan's at-large congressional district =

At-large Philippine legislative district for Pangasinan

- Former constituency for the Malolos Congress, National Assembly of the Philippines and Batasang Pambansa
- Province: Pangasinan
- Region: Ilocos Region (1984–1986)

Former constituency
- Created: 1898 (first creation); 1943 (second creation); 1984 (third creation)
- Abolished: 1907 (first abolition); 1945 (second abolition); 1986 (third abolition)

Pangasinan's at-large congressional district may refer to three occasions when a provincewide at-large district was used for elections to the various Philippine national legislatures representing Pangasinan.

From 1898 to 1901, four representatives (two appointed and two elected) sat in the Malolos Congress, the national assembly of the First Philippine Republic. Pangasinan was reorganized under the Philippine Insular Government in 1901 and was divided into five districts for the Philippine Assembly in 1907. From 1943 to 1944, the province as a whole sent two representatives to the national assembly during the Second Republic. Multiple-district representation was restored in the province in 1945.

In 1978, regional at-large assembly districts were created for the Interim Batasang Pambansa, the national parliament, with Pangasinan included in the 14-seat Region I at-large district. The province returned to its own single, multi-member at-large district in 1984, with a six-seat delegation to the Regular Batasang Pambansa during the Fourth Republic. After 1986, Pangasinan elected its representatives from its separate congressional districts. The district was last represented by Victor Aguedo Agbayani, Gregorio Cendaña, Felipe de Vera, and Conrado Estrella Sr. of Kilusang Bagong Lipunan (KBL), and Demetrio Demetria and Fabian Sison of the United Nationalist Democratic Organization (UNIDO).

== List of members representing the district ==
=== Malolos Congress (1898–1901) ===
Seat A					Seat B					Seat C					Seat D					Legislature	Constituency
Portrait	Member (Lifespan)	Term of office	Party	Electoral history	Portrait	Member (Lifespan)	Term of office	Party	Electoral history	Portrait	Member (Lifespan)	Term of office	Party	Electoral history	Portrait	Member (Lifespan)	Term of office	Party	Electoral history	Legislature	Constituency
District created June 18, 1898.
	Sebastian de Castro	September 15, 1898 – March 23, 1901	Nonpartisan	Appointed by President Emilio Aguinaldo.		Vicente del Prado	September 15, 1898 – March 23, 1901	Nonpartisan	Elected in 1898.		Antonio Feliciano	September 15, 1898 – March 23, 1901	Nonpartisan	Elected in 1898.		Adriano Garces	September 15, 1898 – March 23, 1901	Nonpartisan	Appointed by President Emilio Aguinaldo.	Malolos Congress	1898–1901 [data missing]
District dissolved into Pangasinan's 1st, 2nd, 3rd, 4th, and 5th districts for the Philippine Assembly.

=== National Assembly (1935–1944) ===
==== Second Republic ====
Seat A					Seat B					Legislature	Constituency
Portrait	Member (Lifespan)	Term of office	Party	Electoral history	Portrait	Member (Lifespan)	Term of office	Party	Electoral history	Legislature	Constituency
District re-created September 7, 1943.
	Bernabe Aquino	September 25, 1943 – February 2, 1944	KALIBAPI	Elected in 1943.		Santiago Estrada	September 25, 1943 – February 2, 1944	KALIBAPI	Appointed as an ex officio member. (Note: As Governor of Pangasinan.)	National Assembly (Second Republic)	1943–1944 [data missing]
District dissolved into Pangasinan's 1st, 2nd, 3rd, 4th, and 5th districts for the House of Representatives.

=== Batasang Pambansa (1978–1986) ===
Seat A					Seat B					Seat C					Seat D					Seat E					Seat F					Legislature	Constituency
Portrait	Member (Lifespan)	Term of office	Party	Electoral history	Portrait	Member (Lifespan)	Term of office	Party	Electoral history	Portrait	Member (Lifespan)	Term of office	Party	Electoral history	Portrait	Member (Lifespan)	Term of office	Party	Electoral history	Portrait	Member (Lifespan)	Term of office	Party	Electoral history	Portrait	Member (Lifespan)	Term of office	Party	Electoral history	Legislature	Constituency
District re-created February 1, 1984.
	Victor Aguedo Agbayani (born 1957)	June 30, 1984 – March 25, 1986	KBL	Elected in 1984.		Gregorio Cendaña (1930–2006)	June 30, 1984 – March 25, 1986	KBL	Elected in 1984.		Felipe de Vera	June 30, 1984 – March 25, 1986	KBL	Elected in 1984.		Demetrio Demetria	June 30, 1984 – March 25, 1986	UNIDO	Elected in 1984.		Conrado Estrella Sr. (1917–2011)	June 30, 1984 – March 25, 1986	KBL	Elected in 1984.		Fabian Sison (1916–1994)	June 30, 1984 – March 25, 1986	UNIDO	Elected in 1984.	Regular Batasang Pambansa	1984–1986 [data missing]
District dissolved into Pangasinan's 1st, 2nd, 3rd, 4th, 5th, and 6th districts for the House of Representatives.

== Election results ==
=== 1984 ===
1984 Philippine parliamentary election in Pangasinan
Party	Candidate	Votes	%
KBL	Victor Aguedo Agbayani	532,433	—
KBL	Gregorio Cendaña	407,595	—
KBL	Felipe de Vera	395,210	—
UNIDO	Demetrio Demetria	267,196	—
KBL	Conrado Estrella Sr.	260,426	—
UNIDO	Fabian Sison	240,133	—
KBL	Vicente Millora	178,516	—
KBL	Jeremias Montemayor	177,527	—
KBL	Antonio Villar Sr.	168,756	—
UNIDO	Liberato Reyna	131,819	—
UNIDO	Oscar Orbos	—	—
UNIDO	Romualdo de Leon	—	—
UNIDO	Roberto Ferrer	—	—
PDP–Laban	Ruth Noel	—	—
Nacionalista	Nancy Sison	—	—
Nacionalista	Juan de Vera	—	—
Nacionalista	Manuel Castro	—	—
Nacionalista	Antonio Reyes	—	—
Nacionalista	Leopoldo Quesada	—	—
Christian Democratic Party	Candido Campos	—	—
Federal	Camilo Laforteza	—	—
LM	Cesar Victro	—	—
Independent	Julius Magno	—	—
Independent	Rogelio Perez	—	—
Independent	Rogelio Perez	—	—
