= Mountain Province's 2nd congressional district =

Legislative district of the Philippines

- Former constituency for the House of Representatives of the Philippines
- Province: Mountain Province

Former constituency
- Created: 1935 (first creation); 1945 (second creation)
- Abolished: 1943 (first abolition); 1969 (second abolition)

Mountain Province's 2nd congressional district was one of the three congressional districts of the Philippines in Mountain Province following its division from the at-large district on two occasions between 1935 and 1969. It was first created in 1935 under Act No. 4203 of the Philippine Legislature for the first elections to the National Assembly and the first under the 1935 Constitution. The district was originally composed of the sub-province of Benguet and Baguio, a chartered city independent from the province that did not vote for provincial officials since 1909 by virtue of Act No. 1963, but was included in the district for congressional representation. It was a single-member district throughout the two legislatures of the Commonwealth National Assembly from 1935 to 1941, before it was dissolved into two separate two-member at-large districts for the National Assembly of the Second Republic: one for Mountain Province and another for Baguio City. It was later re-created in 1945 and reverted to a single-member district for the first eight legislatures of the House of Representatives from 1945 to 1969.

It was formally abolished in 1969 following the passage of Republic Act No. 4695 in 1966, which created the province of Benguet, together with Ifugao, Kalinga-Apayao, and the smaller Mountain Province. The sub-province of Benguet, together with the city of Baguio, was redistricted to a new at-large district. The district was last represented by Andres Cosalan of the Liberal Party, who also became the first representative of Benguet's at-large congressional district under the Nacionalista Party following its dissolution.

== List of members representing the district ==
=== National Assembly (1935–1944) ===
==== Commonwealth ====
No.	Portrait	Member	Term of office		Legislature	Party	Electoral history	Constituent LGUs
No.	Portrait	Member	Start	End	Legislature	Party	Electoral history	Constituent LGUs
District created July 23, 1935.
1		Felipe E. Jose	November 15, 1935	December 30, 1938	1st National Assembly	Nacionalista Democratico	Elected in 1935.	1935–1941; Sub-province: Benguet City: Baguio
2		Ramon P. Mitra	December 30, 1938	December 30, 1941	2nd National Assembly	Nacionalista	Elected in 1938.	1935–1941; Sub-province: Benguet City: Baguio
District dissolved into Mountain Province's at-large district for the Second Republic National Assembly.

=== House of Representatives (1945–1973) ===
No.	Portrait	Member	Term of office		Legislature	Party	Electoral history	Constituent LGUs
No.	Portrait	Member	Start	End	Legislature	Party	Electoral history	Constituent LGUs
District re-created May 24, 1945.
(2)		Ramon P. Mitra	June 9, 1945	May 25, 1946	1st Commonwealth Congress	Nacionalista	Re-elected in 1941.	1945–1969; Sub-province: Benguet City: Baguio
3		Jose Mencio	May 25, 1946	December 30, 1949	2nd Commonwealth Congress	Liberal	Elected in 1946.	1945–1969; Sub-province: Benguet City: Baguio
3		Jose Mencio	May 25, 1946	December 30, 1949	1st Congress	Liberal	Elected in 1946.	1945–1969; Sub-province: Benguet City: Baguio
4		Dennis Molintas	December 30, 1949	September 25, 1951	2nd Congress	Liberal	Elected in 1949. Election annulled by House electoral tribunal after an electoral protest.	1945–1969; Sub-province: Benguet City: Baguio
(2)		Ramon P. Mitra	September 25, 1951	December 30, 1965	2nd Congress	Nacionalista	Declared winner of 1949 elections.	1945–1969; Sub-province: Benguet City: Baguio
(2)		Ramon P. Mitra	September 25, 1951	December 30, 1965	3rd Congress	Democratic	Re-elected in 1953.	1945–1969; Sub-province: Benguet City: Baguio
(2)		Ramon P. Mitra	September 25, 1951	December 30, 1965	4th Congress	Nacionalista	Re-elected in 1957.	1945–1969; Sub-province: Benguet City: Baguio
(2)		Ramon P. Mitra	September 25, 1951	December 30, 1965	5th Congress	Nacionalista	Re-elected in 1961.	1945–1969; Sub-province: Benguet City: Baguio
5		Andres Cosalan	December 30, 1965	December 30, 1969	6th Congress	Liberal	Elected in 1965.	1945–1969; Sub-province: Benguet City: Baguio
District dissolved into Benguet's at-large district.

== Election results ==
=== 1953 ===
1953 Philippine House of Representatives elections in Mountain Province
Party	Candidate	Votes	%
Democratic	Ramon P. Mitra (incumbent)	8,139	36.89
Nacionalista	Luis Lardizabal	7,063	32.02
Liberal	Dennis Molintas	6,858	31.09
Total votes		22,060	100.00
Democratic hold			

=== 1965 ===
1965 Philippine House of Representatives elections in Mountain Province
Party	Candidate	Votes	%
Liberal	Andres Cosalan	21,467	50.18
Nacionalista	Luis Lardizabal	20,014	46.78
Independent	Juventino Perfecto	1,290	3.02
Independent	Domingo Tolentino	9	0.02
Total votes		42,780	100.00
Liberal gain from Nacionalista			

== See also ==
- Legislative districts of Mountain Province
