= Victor Dominguez =

Filipino politician (1935–2008)

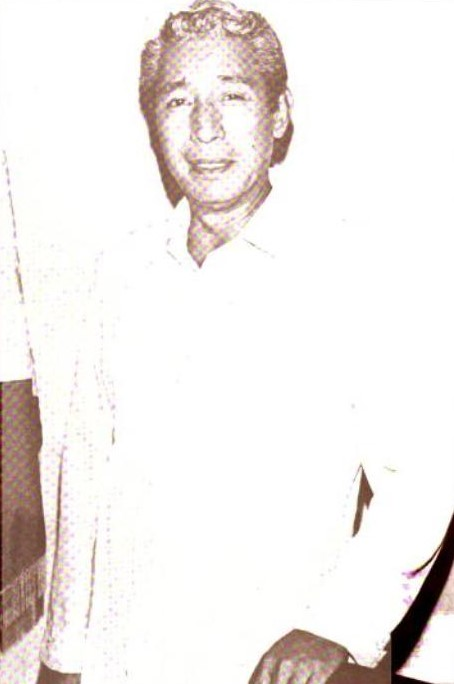
- Dominguez official portrait during the 8th Congress.

Member of the House of Representatives from Mountain Province's at-large district
- In office June 30, 2004 – February 8, 2008
- Preceded by: Roy Pilando
- Succeeded by: Maximo Dalog
- In office June 30, 1987 – June 30, 1998
- Preceded by: District re-established (Last held by Alfredo Lamen Sr.)
- Succeeded by: Josephine Dominguez

Member of the Regular Batasang Pambansa
- In office June 30, 1984 – March 25, 1986
- Constituency: Mountain Province

Member of the Interim Batasang Pambansa
- In office June 12, 1978 – June 5, 1984
- Constituency: Region I

Vice Governor of Mountain Province
- In office April 7, 1967 – January 1, 1968
- Governor: Alfredo Lamen Sr.
- Preceded by: Position established
- Succeeded by: Jaime Gomez Sr.

Personal details
- Born: May 3, 1935
- Died: February 8, 2008 (aged 72)
- Party: KAMPI (2004–2008)
- Other political affiliations: LDP (1995–1998); Lakas–NUCD (1992–1995); Independent (1987–1992); KBL (1978–1987)
- Spouse: Josephine Dominguez
- Children: 4

Victor Sicado Dominguez (May 3, 1935 – February 8, 2008) was a Filipino politician. He started his political career as a Vice-Governor of Mountain Province in 1967. He was later elected to six terms as a member of Congress, representing the Lone District of Mountain Province.

| Preceded by Alfredo G. Lamen | Representative, Lone District of Mountain Province; 1987–1998 | Succeeded by Josephine dC. Dominguez |
| Preceded by Roy S. Pilando | Representative, Lone District of Mountain Province; 2004–2008 | Succeeded by Maximo B. Dalog |
