= Mountain Province's at-large congressional district =

At-large Philippine legislative district for Mountain Province

- Constituency for the House of Representatives of the Philippines
- Location of Mountain Province within the Philippines
- Province: Mountain Province
- Region: Cordillera Administrative Region
- Population: 149,775 (2024)
- Electorate: 121,647 (2025)
- Area: 2,157.38 km^{2} (832.97 sq mi)

Current constituency
- Created: 1916 (first creation); 1943 (second creation); 1966 (third creation)
- Representative: Maximo Dalog Jr.
- Political party: Nacionalista
- Congressional bloc: Majority

Mountain Province's at-large congressional district is the sole congressional district of the Philippines in the Mountain Province. It was first created in 1916, when the province was first granted legislative representation in the House of Representatives under the Philippine Autonomy Act, also known as the Jones Law. The district was initially composed of the sub-provinces of Amburayan, Apayao, Benguet, Bontoc, Ifugao, Kalinga, and Lepanto, together with the independent city of Baguio and the municipalities and municipal districts that had been transferred to the provinces of Cagayan, Ilocos Sur, and La Union, with three members appointed by the governor-general serving as representatives of the province, although they did not need to be residents of the areas they represented. The Spanish politico-military district of Bontoc, which would later become a sub-province during the American period, was earlier represented in the Malolos Congress of the First Republic by a delegate appointed by the president.

In 1935, the district was divided into three separate single-member districts for the Commonwealth National Assembly, serving from 1935 to 1941. The three districts would later be dissolved into one two-member at-large districts for the National Assembly of the Second Republic. The district was later re-created in 1966 following the division of the greater Mountain Province into the provinces of Benguet, Ifugao, Kalinga-Apayao, and a smaller Mountain Province, and reverted to a single-member district for the last legislature of the House of Representatives prior to the imposition of martial law from 1969 to 1972.

The district served as an electoral district in the 1934 Constitutional Convention, with two delegates representing each sub-province, and in the 1971 Constitutional Convention, with two delegates representing Mountain Province at-large.

Following the ratification of the 1973 Constitution and the shift to a parliamentary system, districts were replaced by multi-member regional constituencies, with Mountain Province incorporated into Region I's at-large district for the Interim Batasang Pambansa. When provincial and city district representation was restored in 1984 for the Regular Batasang Pambansa, Mountain Province was represented by one assemblyman. The district was later re-created for the re-established House of Representatives in 1987. It is currently represented in the 20th Congress by Maximo Dalog Jr. of the Nacionalista Party.

== Recent election results from province-wide races ==
Year	Office	Results
2022	President	Bongbong Marcos (PFP) 81.03%
2022	Vice President	Sara Duterte (Lakas) 77.16%
2022	Governor	Bonifacio Lacwasan (PDP–Laban) 89.29%
2025	Governor	Bonifacio Lacwasan (PFP) 52.04%

== List of members representing the district ==
=== Malolos Congress (1898–1901) ===
==== As Bontoc's at-large district ====
Portrait	Member	Term of office		Legislature	Party	Electoral history	Constituent LGUs
Portrait	Member	Start	End	Legislature	Party	Electoral history	Constituent LGUs
District created June 18, 1898.
	Pablo Ocampo	September 15, 1898	March 23, 1901	Nonpartisan	Malolos Congress	Appointed by President Emilio Aguinaldo.	1898–1901; Comandancia politico-militar: Bontoc
District dissolved into Mountain Province's at-large district for the House of Representatives.

=== House of Representatives (1916–1935) ===
==== As Mountain Province's at-large district ====
Seat A						Seat B						Seat C						Legislature	Constituent LGUs
Portrait	Member	Term of office		Party	Electoral history	Portrait	Member	Term of office		Party	Electoral history	Portrait	Member	Term of office		Party	Electoral history	Legislature	Constituent LGUs
Portrait	Member	Start	End	Party	Electoral history	Portrait	Member	Start	End	Party	Electoral history	Portrait	Member	Start	End	Party	Electoral history	Legislature	Constituent LGUs
	Rafael Bulayungan	March 1917	June 6, 1922	Nacionalista	Appointed by Governor-General Francis Burton Harrison.		Juan Cariño	March 1917	June 6, 1922	Nacionalista	Appointed by Governor-General Francis Burton Harrison.		Valentin Manglapus	March 1917	June 3, 1919	Nacionalista	Appointed by Governor-General Francis Burton Harrison.	4th Legislature	1916–1920; Sub-provinces: Amburayan, Apayao, Benguet, Bontoc, Ifugao, Kalinga, Lepanto Independent city: Baguio
	Rafael Bulayungan	March 1917	June 6, 1922	Nacionalista	Appointed by Governor-General Francis Burton Harrison.		Juan Cariño	March 1917	June 6, 1922	Nacionalista	Appointed by Governor-General Francis Burton Harrison.		Pedro Aunario	June 3, 1919	June 6, 1922	Nacionalista	Appointed by Governor-General Francis Burton Harrison.	5th Legislature	1916–1920; Sub-provinces: Amburayan, Apayao, Benguet, Bontoc, Ifugao, Kalinga, Lepanto Independent city: Baguio
	Rafael Bulayungan	March 1917	June 6, 1922	Nacionalista	Appointed by Governor-General Francis Burton Harrison.		Juan Cariño	March 1917	June 6, 1922	Nacionalista	Appointed by Governor-General Francis Burton Harrison.		Pedro Aunario	June 3, 1919	June 6, 1922	Nacionalista	Appointed by Governor-General Francis Burton Harrison.	5th Legislature	1920–1922; Sub-provinces: Apayao, Benguet, Bontoc, Ifugao, Kalinga Independent city: Baguio Municipalities and municipal districts: Alilem, Angaki, Bagulin, Cervantes, Concepcion, Disdis, Pugo, San Emilio, San Gabriel, Santol, Sigay, Sudipen, Sugpon, Suyo, Tagudin
	Joaquin Codamon	June 6, 1922	June 5, 1928	Independent	Appointed by Governor-General Leonard Wood.		Miguel Cornejo	June 6, 1922	October 6, 1925	Independent	Appointed by Governor-General Leonard Wood. Removed from office after a conviction.		Henry Kamora	June 6, 1922	June 2, 1925	Independent	Appointed by Governor-General Leonard Wood.	6th Legislature	1922–1928; Sub-provinces: Apayao, Benguet, Bontoc, Ifugao, Kalinga Independent city: Baguio Municipalities and municipal districts: Alilem, Angaki, Bagulin, Cervantes, Concepcion, Disdis, Langangan, Pugo, San Emilio, San Gabriel, Santol, Sigay, Sudipen, Sugpon, Suyo, Tagudin
	Joaquin Codamon	June 6, 1922	June 5, 1928	Independent	Appointed by Governor-General Leonard Wood.		Miguel Cornejo	June 6, 1922	October 6, 1925	Independent	Appointed by Governor-General Leonard Wood. Removed from office after a conviction.		Saturnino Moldero	June 2, 1925	June 2, 1931	Independent	Appointed by Governor-General Leonard Wood.	7th Legislature	1922–1928; Sub-provinces: Apayao, Benguet, Bontoc, Ifugao, Kalinga Independent city: Baguio Municipalities and municipal districts: Alilem, Angaki, Bagulin, Cervantes, Concepcion, Disdis, Langangan, Pugo, San Emilio, San Gabriel, Santol, Sigay, Sudipen, Sugpon, Suyo, Tagudin
	Joaquin Codamon	June 6, 1922	June 5, 1928	Independent	Appointed by Governor-General Leonard Wood.		Juan Cailles	October 1925	June 2, 1931	Democrata	Appointed by Governor-General Leonard Wood.		Saturnino Moldero	June 2, 1925	June 2, 1931	Independent	Appointed by Governor-General Leonard Wood.	7th Legislature	1922–1928; Sub-provinces: Apayao, Benguet, Bontoc, Ifugao, Kalinga Independent city: Baguio Municipalities and municipal districts: Alilem, Angaki, Bagulin, Cervantes, Concepcion, Disdis, Langangan, Pugo, San Emilio, San Gabriel, Santol, Sigay, Sudipen, Sugpon, Suyo, Tagudin
	Clement Irving	June 5, 1928	June 2, 1931	Independent	Appointed by Governor-General Henry L. Stimson.		Juan Cailles	October 1925	June 2, 1931	Democrata	Appointed by Governor-General Henry L. Stimson.		Saturnino Moldero	June 2, 1925	June 2, 1931	Independent	Appointed by Governor-General Henry L. Stimson.	8th Legislature	1928–1935; Sub-provinces: Apayao, Benguet, Bontoc, Ifugao, Kalinga Independent city: Baguio Municipalities and municipal districts: Alilem, Allacapan, Angaki, Bagulin, Cervantes, Concepcion, Disdis, Langangan, Pugo, San Emilio, San Gabriel, Santol, Sigay, Sudipen, Sugpon, Suyo, Tagudin
	Hilary Clapp	June 2, 1931	June 5, 1934	Nacionalista	Appointed by Governor-General Dwight F. Davis.		Juan Gaerlan	June 2, 1931	June 5, 1934	Independent	Appointed by Governor-General Dwight F. Davis.		Henry Kamora	June 2, 1931	June 5, 1934	Independent	Appointed by Governor-General Dwight F. Davis.	9th Legislature	1928–1935; Sub-provinces: Apayao, Benguet, Bontoc, Ifugao, Kalinga Independent city: Baguio Municipalities and municipal districts: Alilem, Allacapan, Angaki, Bagulin, Cervantes, Concepcion, Disdis, Langangan, Pugo, San Emilio, San Gabriel, Santol, Sigay, Sudipen, Sugpon, Suyo, Tagudin
	Emiliano P. Aguirre	June 5, 1934	November 15, 1935	Nacionalista Democratico	Appointed by Governor-General Frank Murphy.		Felix F. Diaz	June 5, 1934	November 15, 1935	Nacionalista Democratico	Appointed by Governor-General Frank Murphy.		Rodolfo Hidalgo	June 5, 1934	November 15, 1935	Nacionalista Democratico	Appointed by Governor-General Frank Murphy.	10th Legislature	1928–1935; Sub-provinces: Apayao, Benguet, Bontoc, Ifugao, Kalinga Independent city: Baguio Municipalities and municipal districts: Alilem, Allacapan, Angaki, Bagulin, Cervantes, Concepcion, Disdis, Langangan, Pugo, San Emilio, San Gabriel, Santol, Sigay, Sudipen, Sugpon, Suyo, Tagudin
District dissolved into Mountain Province's 1st, 2nd, and 3rd districts for the Commonwealth National Assembly.

=== 1934 Constitutional Convention (1934–1935) ===
Seat A						Seat B						Legislature	Constituent LGUs
Portrait	Member	Term of office		Party	Electoral history	Portrait	Member	Term of office		Party	Electoral history	Legislature	Constituent LGUs
Portrait	Member	Start	End	Party	Electoral history	Portrait	Member	Start	End	Party	Electoral history	Legislature	Constituent LGUs
	Blas Villamor	July 30, 1934	February 19, 1935	Nonpartisan	Elected in 1934.		Jose Fakangan	July 30, 1934	February 19, 1935	Nonpartisan	Elected in 1934.	1934 Constitutional Convention	Sub-province: Apayao
	Sixto A. Gaerlan	July 30, 1934	February 19, 1935	Nonpartisan	Elected in 1934.		Felipe E. Jose	July 30, 1934	February 19, 1935	Nonpartisan	Elected in 1934.	1934 Constitutional Convention	City: Baguio
	Jose O. Cariño	July 30, 1934	February 19, 1935	Nonpartisan	Elected in 1934.		Jose Velasco	July 30, 1934	February 19, 1935	Nonpartisan	Elected in 1934.	1934 Constitutional Convention	Sub-province: Benguet
	Clement Irving	July 30, 1934	February 19, 1935	Nonpartisan	Elected in 1934.		Jose M. Lorenzana	July 30, 1934	February 19, 1935	Nonpartisan	Elected in 1934.	1934 Constitutional Convention	Sub-province: Bontoc
	Alberto Crespillo	July 30, 1934	February 19, 1935	Nonpartisan	Elected in 1934.		Miguel Gumangan	July 30, 1934	February 19, 1935	Nonpartisan	Elected in 1934.	1934 Constitutional Convention	Sub-province: Ifugao
	Max Duguiang	July 30, 1934	February 19, 1935	Nonpartisan	Elected in 1934.		Saturnino Moldero	July 30, 1934	February 19, 1935	Nonpartisan	Elected in 1934.	1934 Constitutional Convention	Sub-province: Kalinga

=== National Assembly (1935–1944) ===
==== Second Republic ====
Seat A						Seat B						Legislature	Constituent LGUs
Portrait	Member	Term of office		Party	Electoral history	Portrait	Member	Term of office		Party	Electoral history	Legislature	Constituent LGUs
Portrait	Member	Start	End	Party	Electoral history	Portrait	Member	Start	End	Party	Electoral history	Legislature	Constituent LGUs
District re-created September 7, 1943.
	Florencio Bagwan	September 25, 1943	February 2, 1944	KALIBAPI	Elected in 1943.		Hilary Clapp	September 25, 1943	February 2, 1944	KALIBAPI	Appointed as an ex officio member. (Note: As Governor of Mountain Province.)	National Assembly (Second Republic)	1943–1944; Sub-provinces: Apayao, Benguet, Bontoc, Ifugao, Kalinga

=== House of Representatives (1945–1973) ===
Portrait	Member	Term of office		Legislature	Party	Electoral history	Constituent LGUs
Portrait	Member	Start	End	Legislature	Party	Electoral history	Constituent LGUs
District re-created June 18, 1966.
	Alfredo Lamen	December 30, 1969	January 17, 1973	7th Congress	Liberal	Re-elected in 1969. Term cut short upon the ratification of a new Constitution.	1969–1973; Barlig, Bauko, Besao, Bontoc, Natonin, Paracelis, Sabangan, Sadanga, Sagada, Tadian
District dissolved into the twelve-seat Region I's at-large district for the Interim Batasang Pambansa.

=== 1971 Constitutional Convention (1971–1972) ===
Seat A						Seat B						Legislature	Constituent LGUs
Portrait	Member	Term of office		Party	Electoral history	Portrait	Member	Term of office		Party	Electoral history	Legislature	Constituent LGUs
Portrait	Member	Start	End	Party	Electoral history	Portrait	Member	Start	End	Party	Electoral history	Legislature	Constituent LGUs
	William Claver	June 1, 1971	November 29, 1972	Nonpartisan	Elected in 1970.		Felix Diaz Sr.	June 1, 1971	November 29, 1972	Nonpartisan	Elected in 1970.	1971 Constitutional Convention	1971–1972; Barlig, Bauko, Besao, Bontoc, Natonin, Paracelis, Sabangan, Sadanga, Sagada, Tadian

=== Batasang Pambansa (1978–1986) ===
Portrait	Member	Term of office		Legislature	Party	Electoral history	Constituent LGUs
Portrait	Member	Start	End	Legislature	Party	Electoral history	Constituent LGUs
District re-created February 1, 1984.
	Victor Dominguez	June 30, 1984	March 25, 1986	Regular Batasang Pambansa	KBL	Elected in 1984.	1984–1986; Barlig, Bauko, Besao, Bontoc, Natonin, Paracelis, Sabangan, Sadanga, Sagada, Tadian

=== House of Representatives (1987–present) ===
Portrait	Member	Term of office		Legislature	Party	Electoral history	Constituent LGUs
Portrait	Member	Start	End	Legislature	Party	Electoral history	Constituent LGUs
District re-created February 2, 1987.
	Victor Dominguez	June 30, 1987	June 30, 1998	8th Congress	Independent	Elected in 1987.	1987–present Barlig, Bauko, Besao, Bontoc, Natonin, Paracelis, Sabangan, Sadanga, Sagada, Tadian
	Victor Dominguez	June 30, 1987	June 30, 1998	8th Congress	Lakas	Elected in 1987.	1987–present Barlig, Bauko, Besao, Bontoc, Natonin, Paracelis, Sabangan, Sadanga, Sagada, Tadian
	Victor Dominguez	June 30, 1987	June 30, 1998	9th Congress	Lakas	Re-elected in 1992.	1987–present Barlig, Bauko, Besao, Bontoc, Natonin, Paracelis, Sabangan, Sadanga, Sagada, Tadian
	Victor Dominguez	June 30, 1987	June 30, 1998	10th Congress	Lakas	Re-elected in 1995.	1987–present Barlig, Bauko, Besao, Bontoc, Natonin, Paracelis, Sabangan, Sadanga, Sagada, Tadian
	Josephine Dominguez	June 30, 1998	June 30, 2001	11th Congress	Lakas	Elected in 1998.	1987–present Barlig, Bauko, Besao, Bontoc, Natonin, Paracelis, Sabangan, Sadanga, Sagada, Tadian
	Roy Pilando	June 30, 2001	June 30, 2004	12th Congress	LDP	Elected in 2001.	1987–present Barlig, Bauko, Besao, Bontoc, Natonin, Paracelis, Sabangan, Sadanga, Sagada, Tadian
	Victor Dominguez	June 30, 2004	February 8, 2008	13th Congress	Independent	Elected in 2004.	1987–present Barlig, Bauko, Besao, Bontoc, Natonin, Paracelis, Sabangan, Sadanga, Sagada, Tadian
	Victor Dominguez	June 30, 2004	February 8, 2008	14th Congress	KAMPI	Re-elected in 2007. Died in office.	1987–present Barlig, Bauko, Besao, Bontoc, Natonin, Paracelis, Sabangan, Sadanga, Sagada, Tadian
Vacant		February 8, 2008	June 30, 2010	14th Congress	—	Manuel Agyao designated as caretaker. No special election held to fill vacancy.	1987–present Barlig, Bauko, Besao, Bontoc, Natonin, Paracelis, Sabangan, Sadanga, Sagada, Tadian
	Maximo Dalog Sr.	June 30, 2010	June 3, 2017	15th Congress	Liberal	Elected in 2010.	1987–present Barlig, Bauko, Besao, Bontoc, Natonin, Paracelis, Sabangan, Sadanga, Sagada, Tadian
	Maximo Dalog Sr.	June 30, 2010	June 3, 2017	16th Congress	Liberal	Re-elected in 2013.	1987–present Barlig, Bauko, Besao, Bontoc, Natonin, Paracelis, Sabangan, Sadanga, Sagada, Tadian
	Maximo Dalog Sr.	June 30, 2010	June 3, 2017	17th Congress	Liberal	Re-elected in 2016. Died in office.	1987–present Barlig, Bauko, Besao, Bontoc, Natonin, Paracelis, Sabangan, Sadanga, Sagada, Tadian
Vacant		June 3, 2017	June 30, 2019	17th Congress	—	Allen Jesse Mangaoang designated as caretaker. (Note: From July 5, 2017 to June 30, 2019.); No special election held to fill vacancy.	1987–present Barlig, Bauko, Besao, Bontoc, Natonin, Paracelis, Sabangan, Sadanga, Sagada, Tadian
	Maximo Dalog Jr.	June 30, 2019	Incumbent	18th Congress	Nacionalista	Elected in 2019.	1987–present Barlig, Bauko, Besao, Bontoc, Natonin, Paracelis, Sabangan, Sadanga, Sagada, Tadian
	Maximo Dalog Jr.	June 30, 2019	Incumbent	19th Congress	Nacionalista	Elected in 2022.	1987–present Barlig, Bauko, Besao, Bontoc, Natonin, Paracelis, Sabangan, Sadanga, Sagada, Tadian
	Maximo Dalog Jr.	June 30, 2019	Incumbent	20th Congress	Nacionalista	Re-elected in 2025.	1987–present Barlig, Bauko, Besao, Bontoc, Natonin, Paracelis, Sabangan, Sadanga, Sagada, Tadian

== Election results ==
=== 1984 ===
1984 Philippine parliamentary election in Mountain Province
Party	Candidate	Votes	%
KBL	Victor Dominguez	15,754	65.97
PDP–Laban	William Claver	7,620	31.91
Nacionalista	Padong Lazaro	508	2.13

=== 1992 ===
1992 Philippine House of Representatives elections in Mountain Province
Party	Candidate	Votes	%
Lakas	Victor Dominguez (incumbent)	20,432	52.14
NPC/LP–PDP	Roy Pilando	17,413	44.44
KBL	Eduardo Badecao	1,341	3.42
Total votes		39,186	100.00
Lakas hold			

=== 1995 ===
1995 Philippine House of Representatives elections in Mountain Province
Party	Candidate	Votes	%
Lakas	Victor Dominguez (incumbent)	32,521	66.67
PDP–Laban	William Claver	16,255	33.33
Total votes		48,776	100.00
Lakas hold			

=== 1998 ===
1998 Philippine House of Representatives elections in Mountain Province
Party	Candidate	Votes	%
Lakas	Josephine Dominguez	19,559	37.30
PROMDI	Roy Pilando	19,300	36.81
LAMMP	Maximo Dalog Sr.	13,571	25.88
PDP–Laban	Julio Bantali	2	0.00
Total votes		52,432	100.00
Lakas hold			

=== 2010 ===
2010 Philippine House of Representatives elections in Mountain Province
Party	Candidate	Votes	%
Lakas–Kampi	Maximo Dalog Sr.	24,724	33.71
Nacionalista	Jupiter Dominguez	23,973	32.68
Aksyon	Franklin Odsey	18,792	25.62
Independent	Thomas Perry Killip	5,865	8.00
Total votes		73,354	100.00
Lakas–Kampi gain from KAMPI			

=== 2013 ===
2013 Philippine House of Representatives elections in Mountain Province
Party	Candidate	Votes	%
Liberal	Maximo Dalog Sr. (incumbent)	32,597	43.15
UNA	Jupiter Dominguez	29,218	38.68
NPC	Roy Manao	13,720	18.16
Total votes		75,535	100.00
Liberal hold			

=== 2016 ===
2016 Philippine House of Representatives elections in Mountain Province
Party	Candidate	Votes	%
Liberal	Maximo Dalog Sr. (incumbent)	63,629	100.00
Total votes		63,629	100.00
Liberal hold			

=== 2019 ===
2019 Philippine House of Representatives elections in Mountain Province
Party	Candidate	Votes	%
Nacionalista	Maximo Dalog Jr.	25,701	31.72
Independent	Avelino Amangyen	17,778	21.94
Independent	Jupiter Dominguez	17,366	21.44
PDP–Laban	Anthony Wooden	11,004	13.58
PFP	Allen Ocden	8,880	10.96
PRP	Abrian Libang	185	0.23
Independent	Albert Paday-os	102	0.13
Total votes		81,016	100.00
Nacionalista gain from Liberal			

=== 2022 ===
2022 Philippine House of Representatives elections in Mountain Province
Party	Candidate	Votes	%
Nacionalista	Maximo Dalog Jr. (incumbent)	52,927	55.10
Lakas	Jupiter Dominguez	41,437	43.23
Total votes		94,364	100.00
Nacionalista hold			

=== 2025 ===
2025 Philippine House of Representatives elections in Mountain Province
Party	Candidate	Votes	%
Nacionalista	Maximo Dalog Jr. (incumbent)	85,006	100.00
Total votes		85,006	100.00
Nacionalista hold			

== See also ==
- Legislative districts of Mountain Province
