= San Fernando, La Union =

Capital city of La Union, Philippines

San Fernando
- Component city
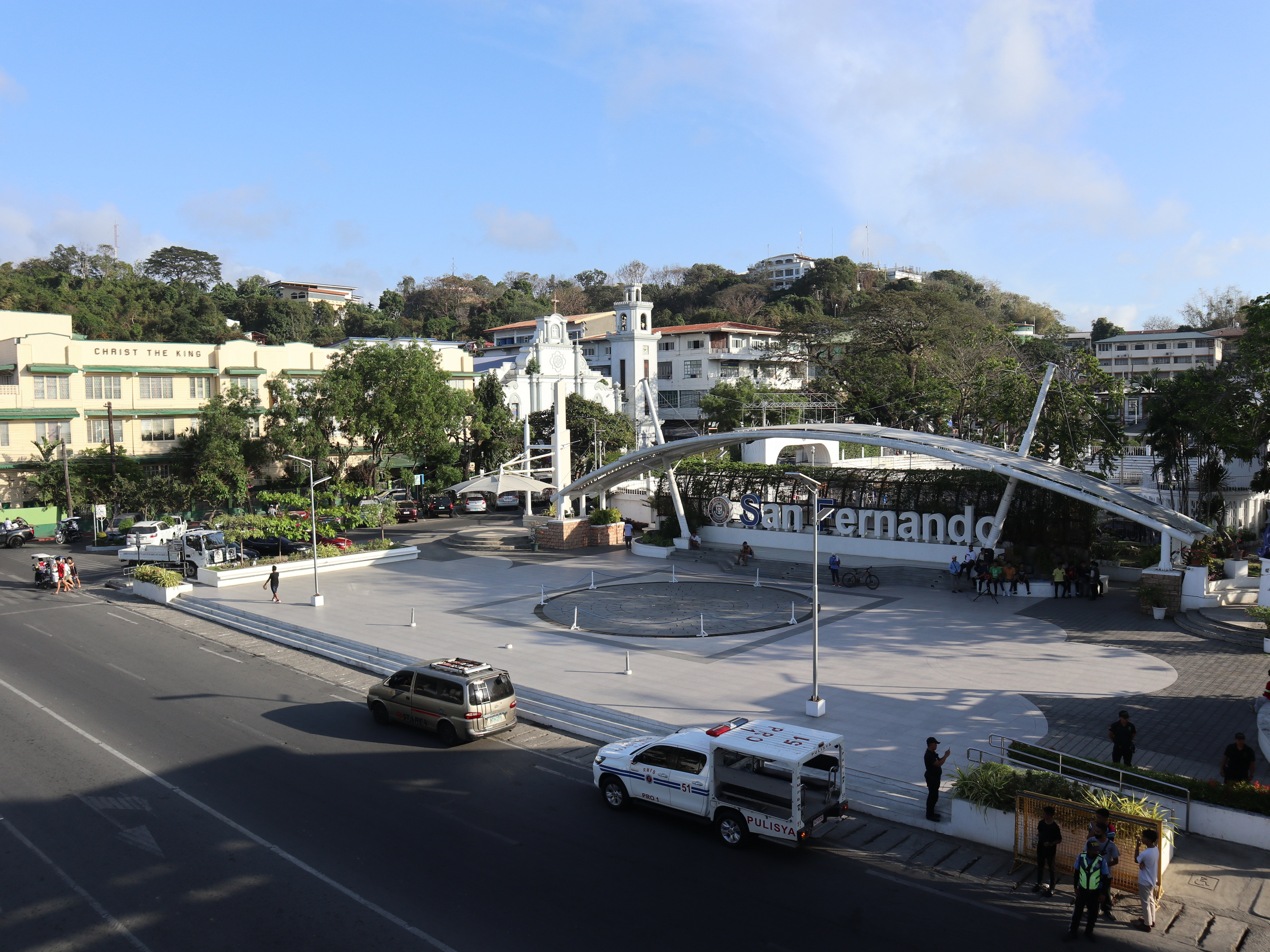
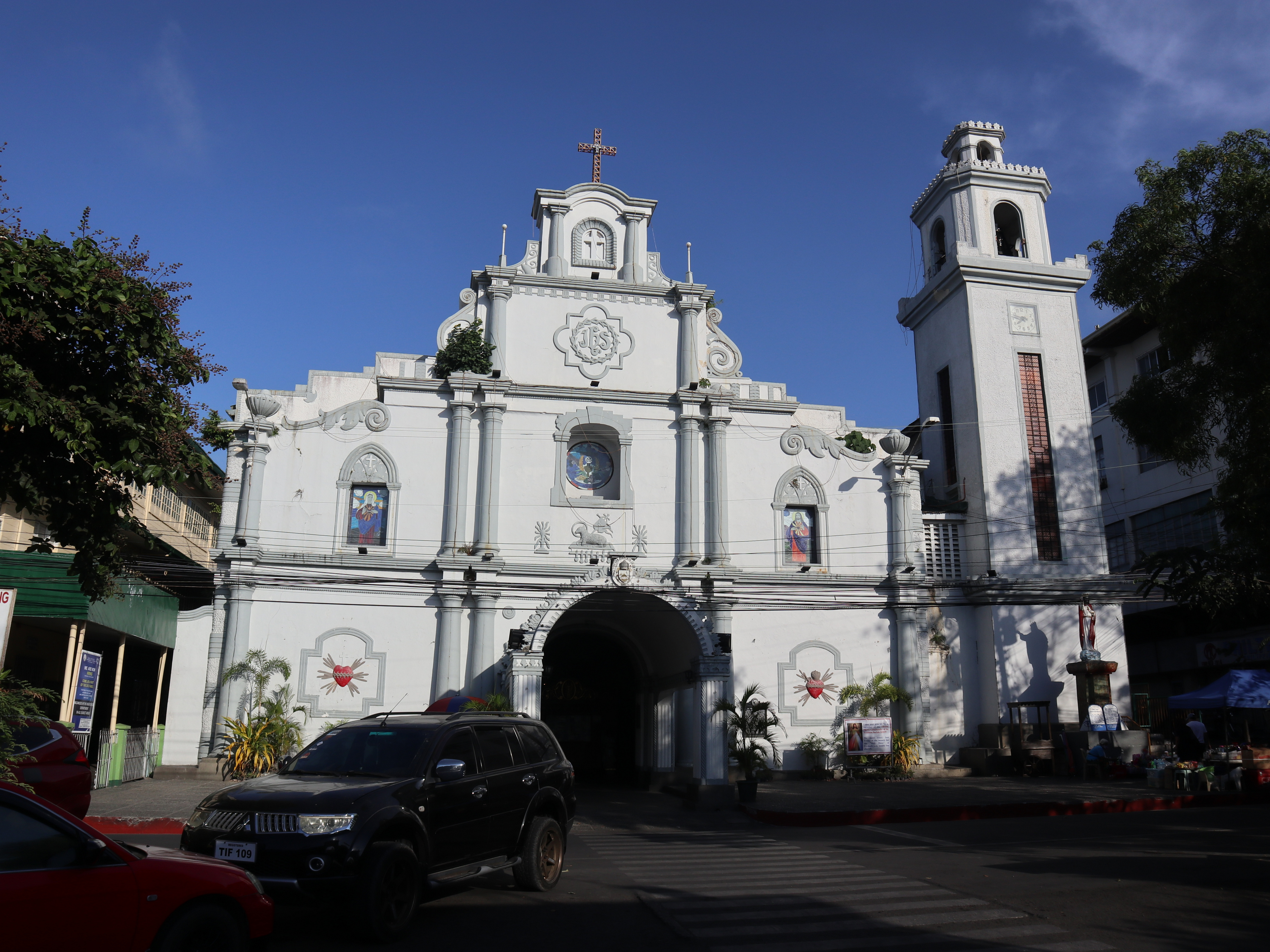
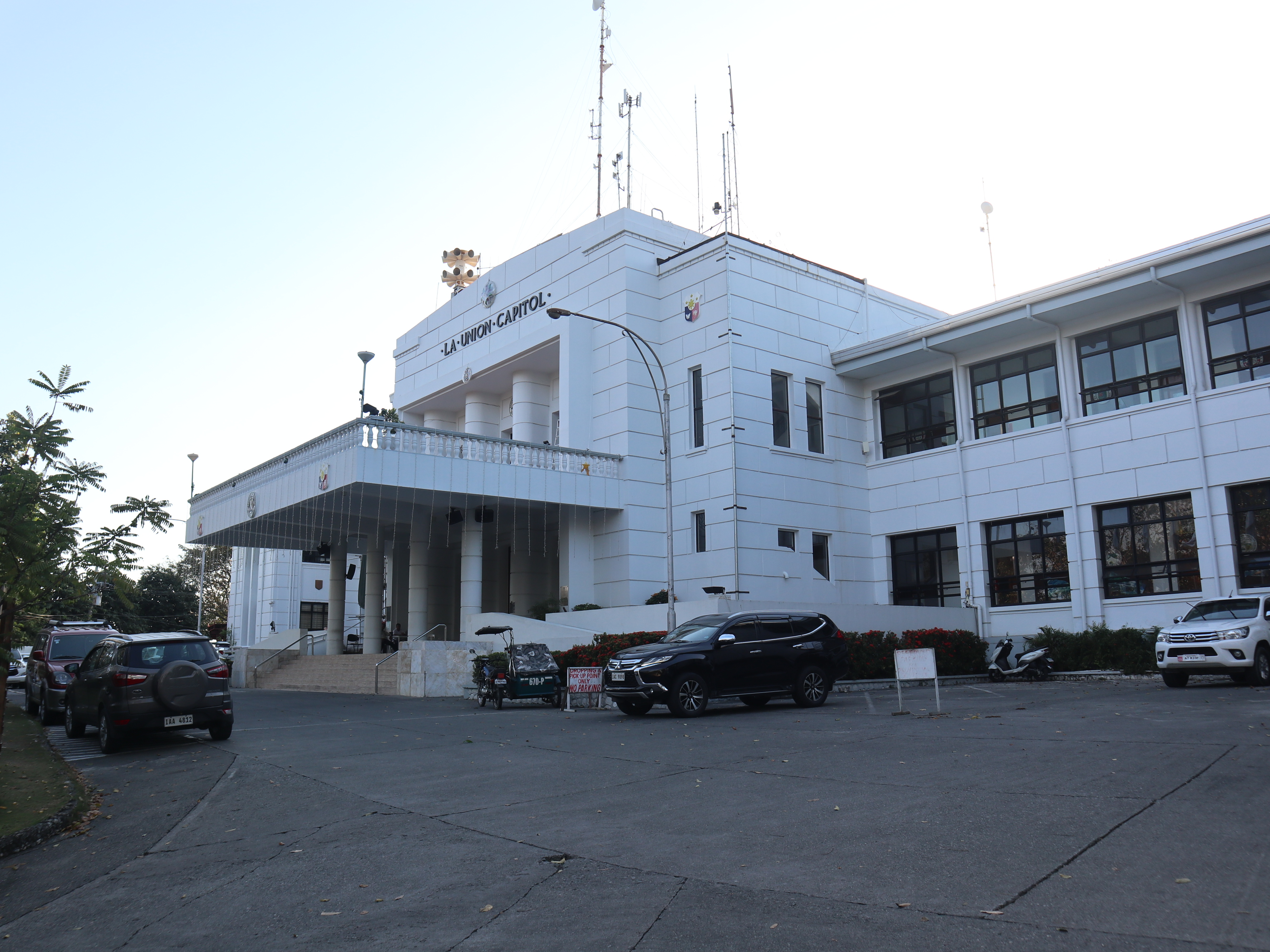
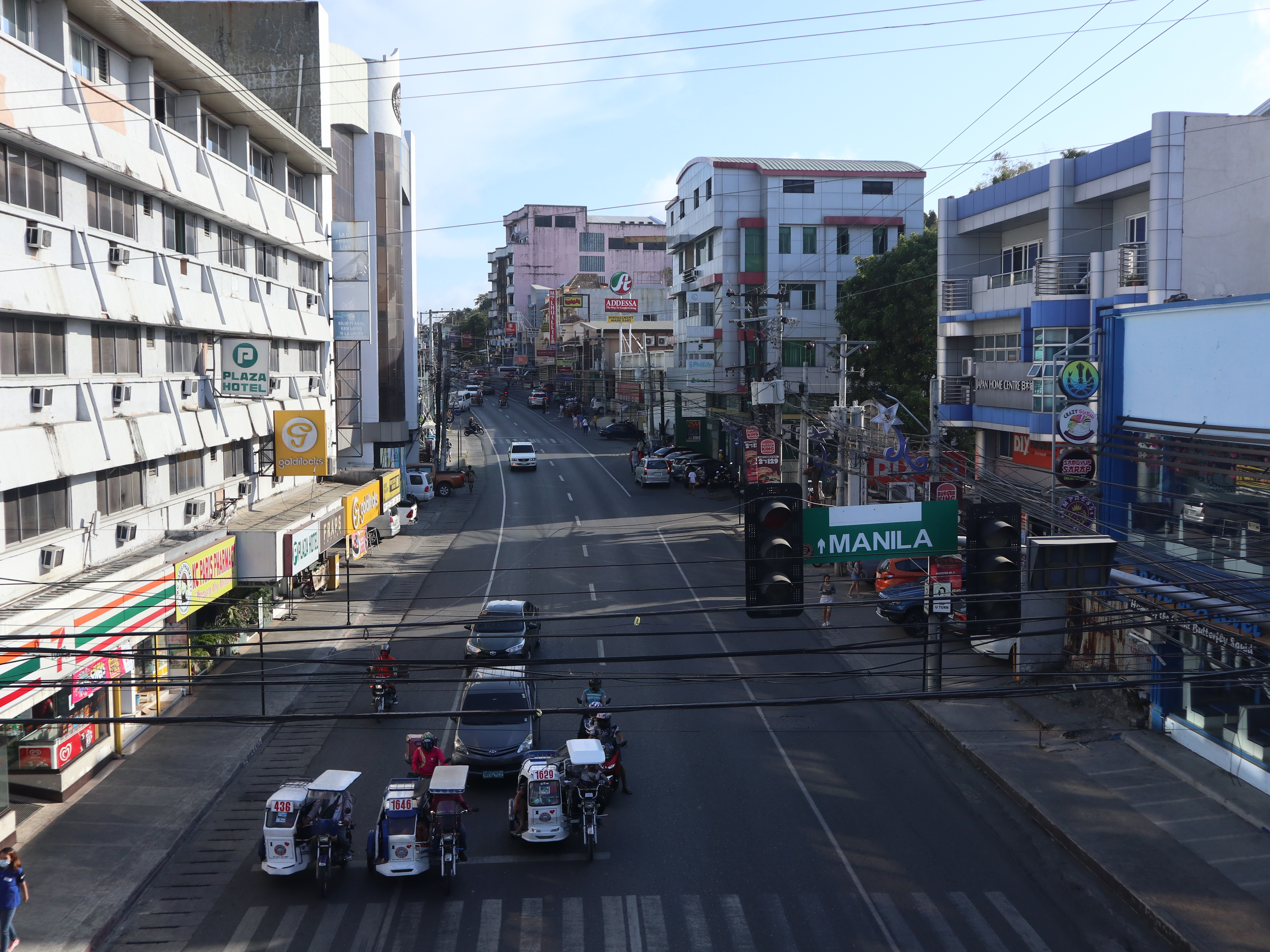
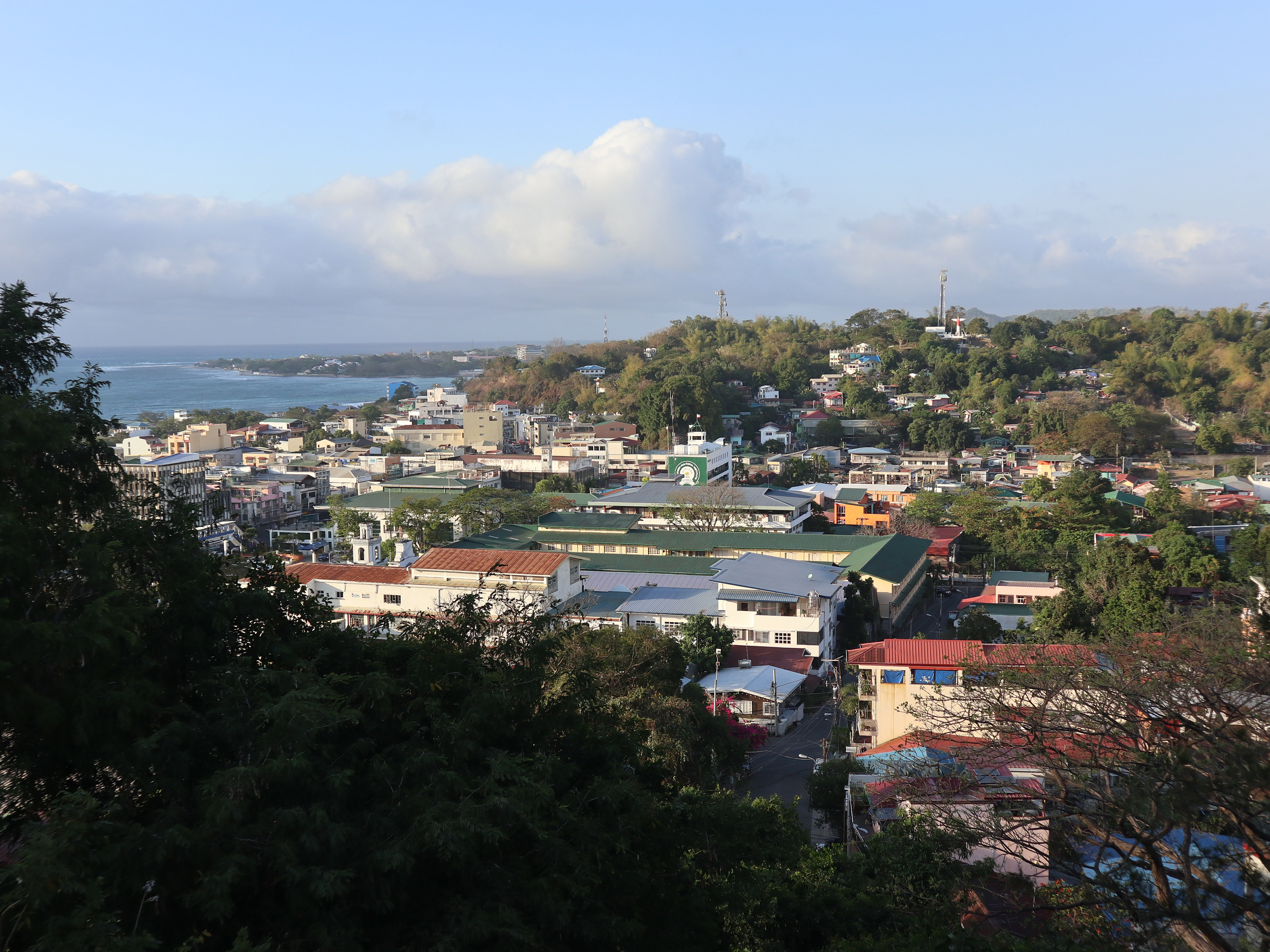
- (from top: left to right) Town Plaza, Cathedral of Saint William the Hermit, La Union Provincial Capitol, Manila North Road, Ma-Cho Taoist Temple and San Fernando Skyline

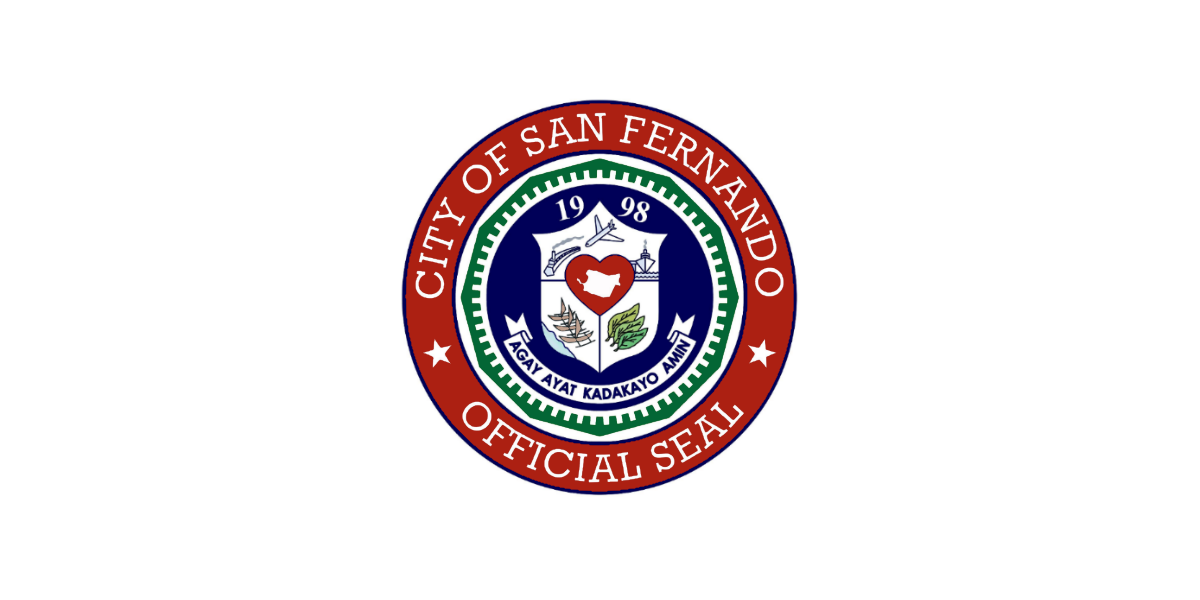
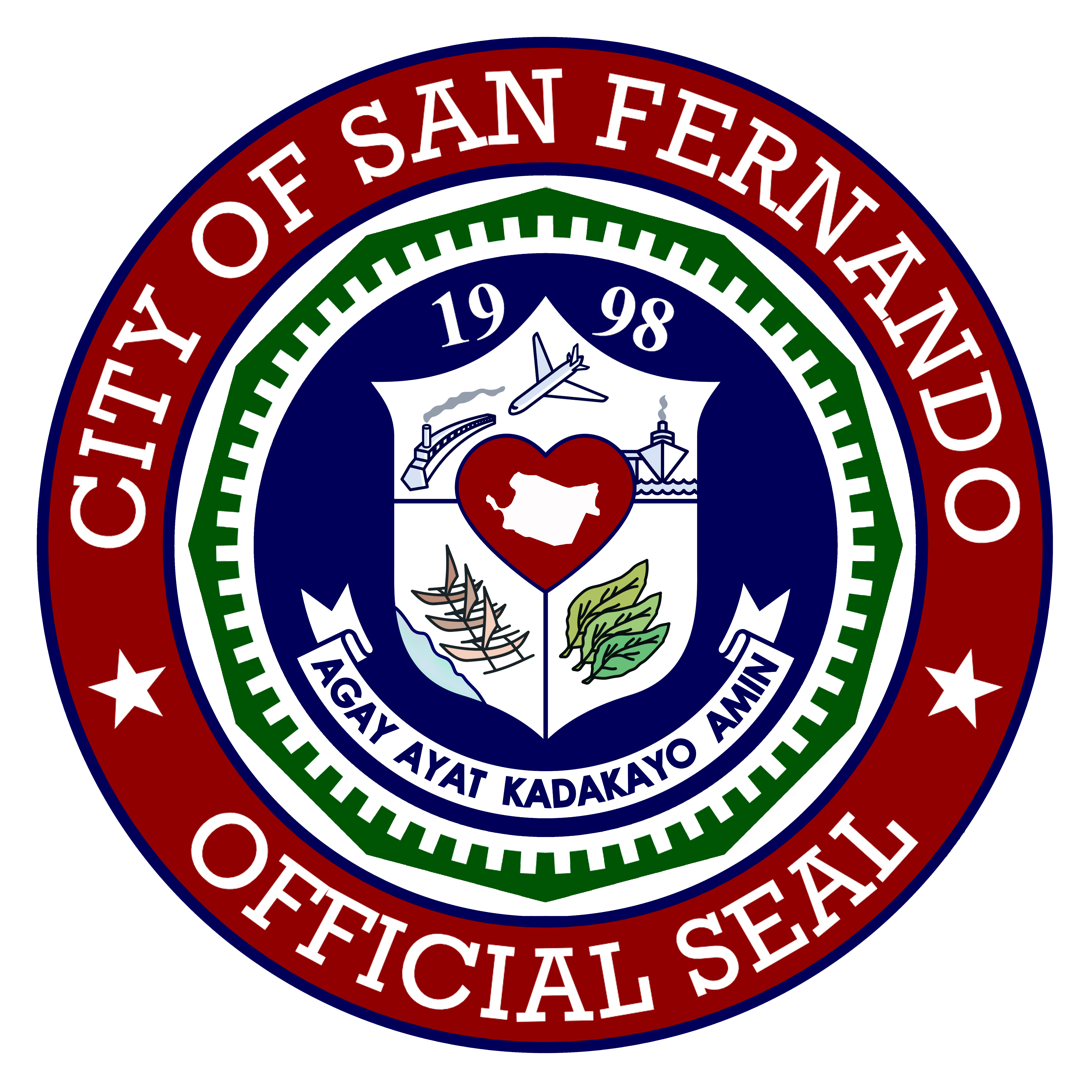
- Flag Seal
- Nicknames: Prime Capital of Ilocandia; Botanical Garden City
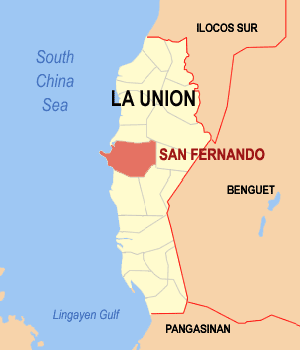
- Map of La Union with San Fernando highlighted
- Interactive map of San Fernando
- Location within the Philippines
- Coordinates: 16°37′N 120°19′E
- Country: Philippines
- Region: Ilocos Region
- Province: La Union
- District: 1st district
- Founded: May 6, 1786
- Cityhood: March 20, 1998
- Named for: Ferdinand III of Castile
- Barangays: 59 (see Barangays)

Government
  - Type: Sangguniang Panlungsod
  - Mayor: Hermenegildo A. Gualberto
  - Vice Mayor: Alfredo Pablo R. Ortega
  - Representative: Francisco Paolo P. Ortega V
  - City Council: Members: Kyle Marie Eufrosito Y. Nisce; Pablo C. Ortega; Lucia Esperanza O. Valero; Jonathan Justo A. Orros; Edwin H. Yumul; Janwell E. Pacio; Rodolfo M. Abat; Arnel A. Almazan; Aldrine R. Jucar; John H. Orros; Mark Anthony A. Ducusin; Quintin L. Balcita Jr.
  - Electorate: 77,490 voters (2025)

Area
  - Total: 102.72 km^{2} (39.66 sq mi)
- Elevation: 101 m (331 ft)
- Highest elevation: 1,124 m (3,688 ft)
- Lowest elevation: 0 m (0 ft)

Population (2024 census)
  - Total: 124,809
  - Density: 1,215.0/km^{2} (3,146.9/sq mi)
  - Households: 32,184

Economy
  - Income class: 2nd city income class
  - Poverty incidence: 3.79% (2023)
  - Revenue: ▲PHP 1,195,136,008.92 billion (22.11%) (2022)
  - Assets: ▲PHP 2,661,462,427.51 billion (20.67%) (2022)
  - Equity: ▲PHP 2,241,183,510.80 billion (15.89%) (2022)
  - Expenditure: ▼PHP 891,095,816.44 million (-7.00%) (2022)
  - Liabilities: ▲PHP 420,278,916.71 million (54.63%) (2022)

Service provider
  - Electricity: La Union Electric Company (LUECO)
- Time zone: UTC+8 (PST)
- ZIP code: 2500
- PSGC: 013314000
- IDD : area code: +63 (0)72
- Native languages: Ilocano; Tagalog
- Website: www.sanfernandocity.gov.ph

San Fernando, officially the City of San Fernando (Ilocano: Siudad ti San Fernando; Filipino: Lungsod ng San Fernando), is a component city and the capital of the province of La Union, Philippines. It serves as the regional and administrative center of the Ilocos Region. The city also functions as a hub for trade and commerce in northern Luzon and as a center for the culture and heritage of Ilocandia. According to the 2024 census, it has a population of 124,809 people with 77,490 registered voters as of 2025.

The City of San Fernando is a coastal city facing the South China Sea to the west and bordered by the Cordillera Central mountain range to the east. It consists of 59 barangays and has a total land area of 105.26 square kilometers. The city's majority ethnolinguistic group are the Ilocano people who speak Iloco language, as the city has historically been an Ilocano stronghold. It is one of two provincial capitals in the Philippines named San Fernando, the other being San Fernando, Pampanga.

As the regional center of the Ilocos Region, San Fernando hosts several regional and field offices of national government agencies, regional branches of government financial institutions, and various government-owned and controlled corporations. The city is also home to key educational and medical institutions, including the Ilocos Training and Regional Medical Center, which serves as the primary public health and medical facility in the region. In addition, is it the most populous city in La Union.

== Etymology ==
The name San Fernando traces its origins to its former designation, Pindangan, an Iloco term derived from pindang, meaning "to dry fish or meat with salt." Pindangan referred to a place where this process was carried out, signifying the area's early economic activities centered on fish and meat preservation.

On May 6, 1786, the settlement was renamed San Fernando by Father Fernando Rey, in honor of Ferdinand III of Castile, also known as Saint Ferdinand III of León (San Fernando III de León), a 13th-century king who reigned as King of Castile from 1217, King of León from 1230, and King of Galicia from 1231; he is celebrated for his successful Christian conquest of Seville during the Reconquista and was canonized for his piety, military leadership, and promotion of Christian unity.

== History ==
=== Early history ===
The early history of the city can be traced back to its initial settlements by the Samtoy (Ilocano) people and a small community of Pangasinan traders who inhabited the coastal shores and riverbanks. In the highland areas, the early inhabitants included the Cordillerans (Igorot), particularly the Kankanaey people. These early communities were animist-pagan believers and were renowned for their farming, hunting and seafaring skills.

According to historian William Henry Scott, the coastal area of the Ilocos region, including San Fernando City, served as a significant hub for gold trading with the Cordilleran (Igorot) people from the highlands. The settlers also engaged in trade with neighboring communities, such as the Pangasinan, Sambal and Tagalog peoples, as well as with foreign traders from Maritime Southeast Asia, China (particularly from Fujian during the Ming Dynasty), and Japan. Japanese traders later established a trading port in Aroo (modern-day Agoo), a northern section of pre-colonial Pangasinan.

Commonly traded goods included gold, jewelry, earthen jars (burnay), silk, rice, cotton, beeswax, honey, wine (basi), metals, and ceramics or porcelain.

=== Spanish Regime ===
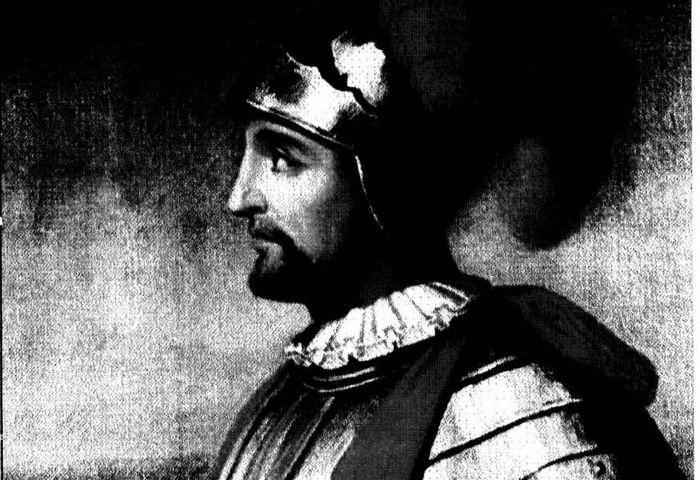
Spanish Conquistador Juan de Salcedo

In June 1572, Spanish conquistador Juan de Salcedo arrived in the area now known as San Fernando, following his successful pacification of native and Japanese settlers in Aroo or Agoho (present-day Agoo). Miguel de Loarca in 1582 describe the settlement as "el puerto de Japon" due to its significance as a Japanese trading post.

Upon reaching San Fernando, he encountered the indigenous inhabitants and demanded tribute on behalf of the Spanish Crown. The locals requested time to gather the tribute from the mountains but never returned. Salcedo then continued his journey, sailing and exploring northward until he established Vigan as the administrative center of Spanish governance and influence in Northern Luzon. This development marked the beginning of efforts to convert the local population to Christianity.

By 1759, the early settlements of San Fernando consisted of two barrios established by Augustinians friars: San Guillermo de Dalangdang, situated at the foothills of the Cordillera mountains, and San Vicente de Balanac, a coastal village. San Guillermo often became a target of headhunting by the Igorots during the blooming of flowering trees, as such acts were believed to appease their deities.

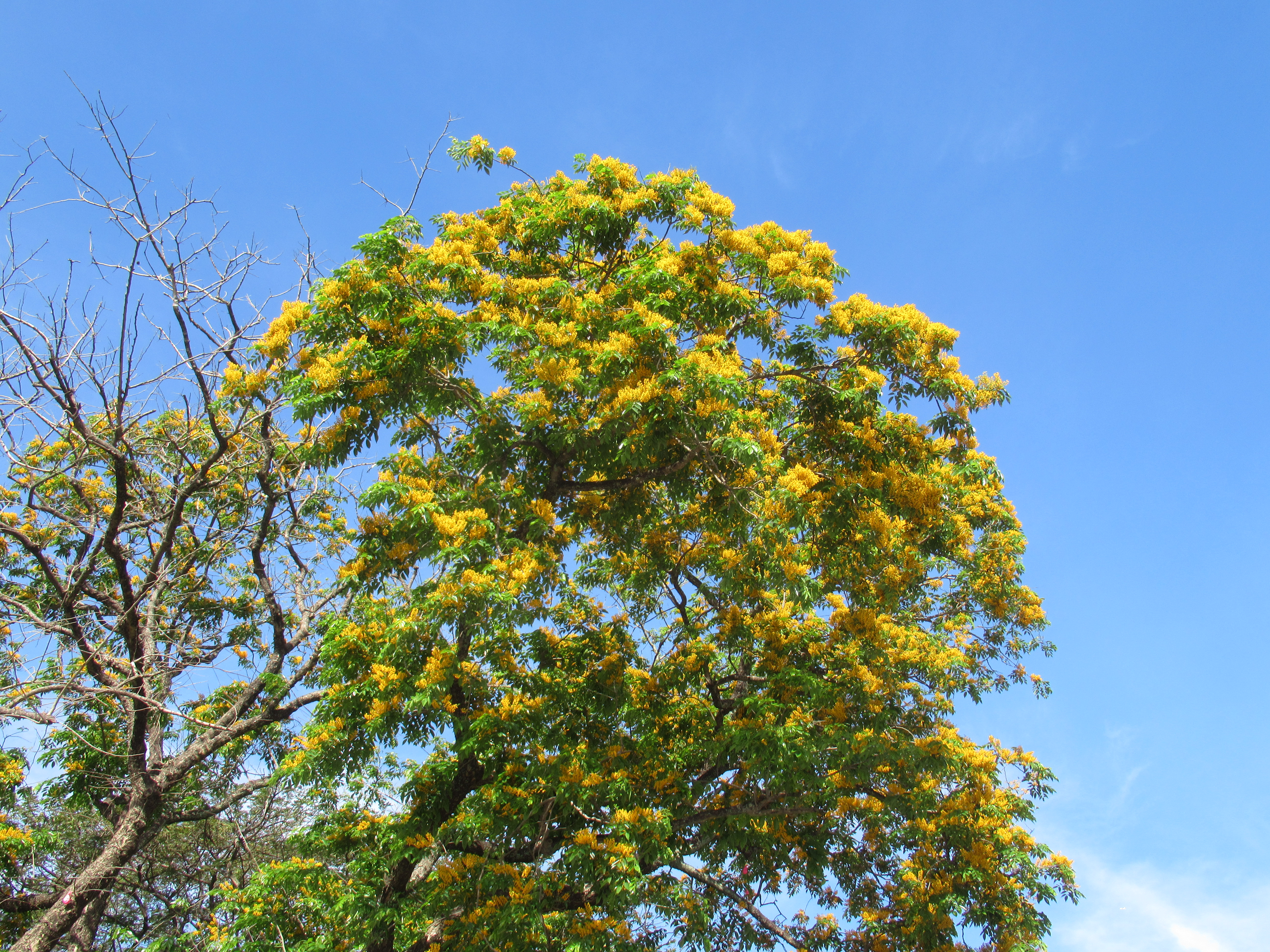
Blooming Narra Tree

Meanwhile, during the calm summer months, San Vicente de Balanac suffered raids by Tirongs and Moro pirates, who abducted women and children and left widespread destruction. In response to these relentless attacks, Father Jose Torres, an Augustinian friar, encouraged the remaining populations of San Guillermo de Dalangdang and San Vicente de Balanac to unite for their mutual protection.

In 1762, they established a new settlement called Pindangan, named after the Iloco term pindang, meaning "to dry fish or meat." The name "Pindangan" reflected the area's role as a site for fish-drying activities. A large church was constructed in the settlement, serving as its central landmark. However, the church was later destroyed by a devastating earthquake.

In 1764, Don Santiago Olarte was appointed as the first gobernadorcillo of Pindangan, a position equivalent to that of a modern-day mayor. Following the destruction of the original church by an earthquake, the Franciscans decided not to rebuild it in its original location. Instead, during the rainy season, they relocated the church to a more suitable site. This structure eventually became known as the Cathedral of St. William the Hermit, now part of the Diocese of San Fernando, La Union.

By 1785, During the administration of Governor-General José Basco in 1785, San Fernando along with its neighboring pueblos, was placed under the northern territorial jurisdiction of Pangasinan province as part of broader efforts to improve governance and economic productivity during the Spanish colonial period.

On May 6, 1786, Pindangan was officially renamed and established as the Ministerio de San Fernando by Father Fernando Rey, in honor of King Ferdinand of Spain. However, between 1792 and 1831, a shortage of priests led to San Fernando becoming a visita (mission station) of the nearby towns of Bauang and San Juan. It was only in 1831 that Fr. Juan Sorolla, who had served as the parish priest of Bauang since 1829, was assigned to San Fernando, further cementing its religious and administrative significance.

San Fernando society during this period was divided into two classes: the babaknang and the cailianes. The babaknang or baknang referred to the wealthy and the local elite, often landowners and educated individuals, many of whom were part of the principalia or insulares who spoke Castilian. The cailianes, on the other hand, were the idios or the common folk, often landless or with limited resources, speaking Iloco, Kankanai, and Ibaloi. The Mestizos de Sangley or Chinos, tracing their ancestry to Chinese settlers, were also prevalent in the town. Ilocano served as the town's lingua franca.

By 1850, San Fernando had a population of 4,805, including a single ranchería called San Ramon, located in the mountainous areas of the town with 798 population. Don Bagulin served as the gobernadorcillo of San Ramon, which was primarily inhabited by the Vagos or Bago people—Christianized Igorots or Nuevo Cristianos of Kankanaey and Ibaloi descent.

==== San Fernando as the Cabecera ====
On October 29, 1849, Governor-General Narciso Zaldua Clavería issued a promovido that unified eight northern towns of Pangasinan including San Fernando, three southern towns of Ilocos Sur located south of the Amburayan River, and 40-45 rancherias of the Eastern País del Igorotes in the Cordilleras to form the province of La Union. Subsequently, on March 2, 1850, Governor-General Antonio María Blanco signed the Superior Decreto, officially establishing La Union and designating San Fernando as its capital, or cabecera. Captain Toribio Ruiz de la Escalera was appointed as the first Gobernador Militar y Político.

The creation of La Union was officially ratified by a royal decree issued by Queen Isabella II of Spain on April 18, 1854. By the late 19th century, the migration of settlers from the Ilocos provinces resulted in San Fernando becoming predominantly inhabited by Ilocanos, alongside Ilocanized Pangasinenses and Bago people. By 1879 San Fernando population had become 10,604 since the formation of La Union province.

=== Philippine Revolution (1896–1898) ===
On September 10, 1896, shortly after the Cry of Pugad Lawin, a significant event unfolded in San Fernando when Spanish authorities uncovered a conspiracy against the colonial government. Leading the crackdown was Fray Rafael Redondo, the Vicar Forane of San Fernando, who acted swiftly against suspected revolutionaries. Among the first arrested was Dr. Lucino Almeida, a respected community figure targeted for his alleged involvement in the revolutionary movement, which had gained momentum following the events of Pugad Lawin and the increasing influence of the Katipunan, led by Andrés Bonifacio.

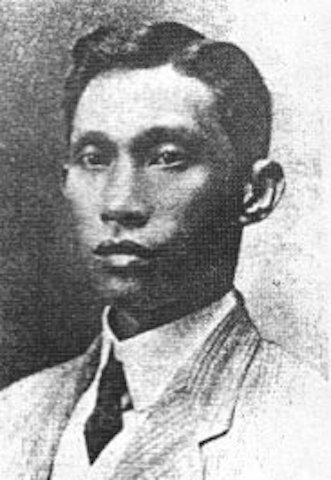
Gen. Manuel Tinio, who led the Philippine revolution in La Union

On September 17, 1896, three native coadjutor priests from La Union, including Padre Mariano Gaerlan of San Fernando, were tortured for their alleged participation in a conspiracy against the Spanish colonial government, deepening the people's resentment toward Spanish rule.

The revolution in San Fernando began on May 22, 1898, after the killing of a priest in Santo Tomas. San Fernando guerrillas stormed and burned houses and killed pro-Spanish sympathizers in the town. Women also became victims of brutal acts, with one storekeeper left mentally deranged. The Philippine Revolution erupted in 1898, sparking a nationwide movement for independence. On July 22, 1898, Filipino insurgents, led by General Manuel Tinio, General Mauro Ortiz, and Major Joaquin Alejandrino, attacked the Spanish garrison in San Fernando with over 600 men. The Spanish, commanded by Colonel Jose Garcia Herrero, fortified key buildings and awaited reinforcements. Despite Tinio's attempts at peaceful negotiation, the Spanish forces refused to surrender. After several days of deadlock, Tinio launched an assault on July 31, resulting in a fierce battle that culminated in the Spaniards' surrender.

This event marked the signing of the Actas de Capitulaciones (Acts of Surrender). San Fernando became the 13th of 29 towns and cities to witness the Spanish capitulation, with 400 soldiers, eight officers, and substantial military resources surrendering. After a century of Spanish colonization, San Fernando was finally liberated, and for the first time since its founding on March 2, 1850, a Filipino assumed authority over the Casa Real.

=== American Regime (1899–1901) ===
After the 1898 Spanish-American War, the Philippines was ceded to the United States under the Treaty of Paris, marking the beginning of American colonization. During the Philippine-American War (1899–1902), San Fernando became a site of intense military conflict, including forced relocations, killings, and property destruction, which fueled local resistance. A key event was the U.S. naval bombardment as General Gregorio del Pilar covered President Emilio Aguinaldo's retreat.

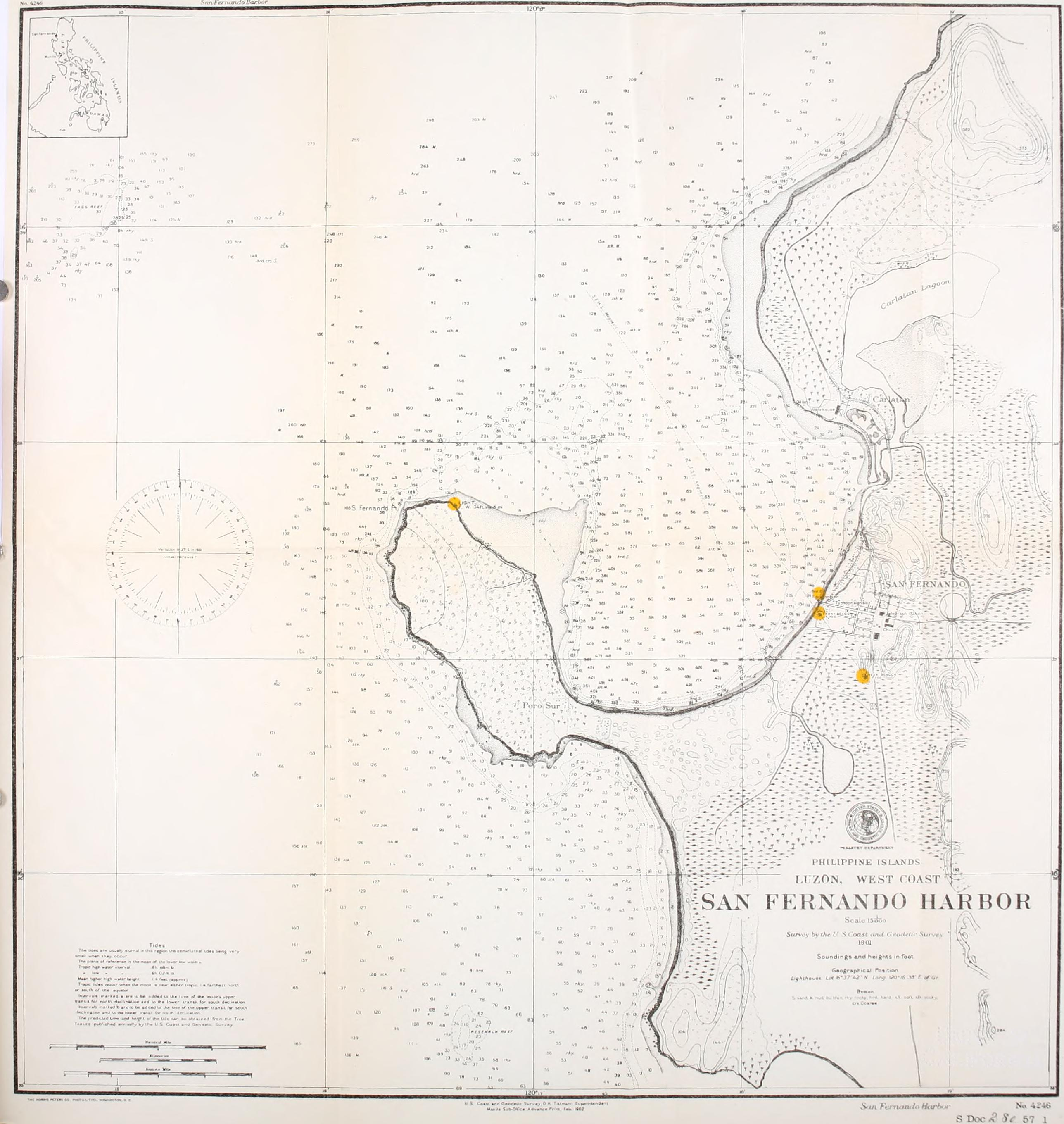
Gazetteer of San Fernando Harbor Map, circa 1901

On August 1, 1899, the U.S. merchant steamer Saturnus attempted to dock at San Fernando but was seized by the revolutionary army under international law. Although the ship caught fire, all passengers, crew, and property were saved, and prisoners were handed over to General Arthur MacArthur. In response, U.S. Navy ships bombarded San Fernando on August 7, reducing the town to ruins. Foreign Affairs Secretary Felipe Buencamino filed diplomatic protests against the attacks, but no response was received. The bombardment continued in San Fernando, Bauang, and San Juan, destroying properties and resulting in civilian casualties.

On November 18, 1899, U.S. Expeditionary Forces under General Samuel Baldwin Marks Young entered La Union in pursuit of President Emilio Aguinaldo, leading to several battles across different towns, including the rice fields of San Fernando. Filipino revolutionaries in San Fernando were led by Captain Fortunato Gaerlan of Guerrilla Unit 3, which also operated in San Juan.

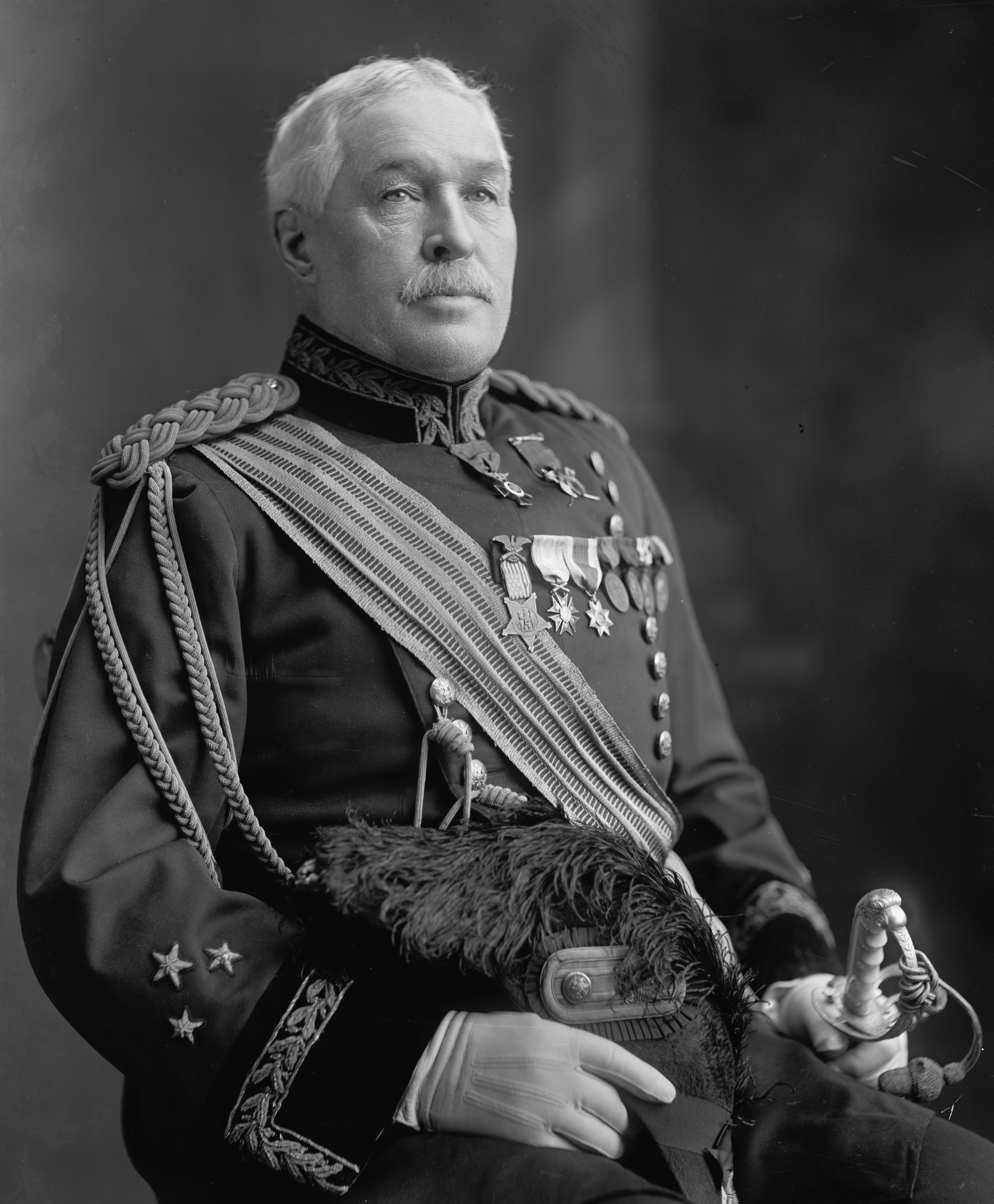
Gen. Samuel B.M. Young, Commanded Brigades in the Northern Luzon District.

By November 20, General Young entered and captured San Fernando by November 21, describing the town as "a series of the most formidable entrenchments." He took control of the revolutionary headquarters and estimated the presence of around 1,000 Filipino insurgents, several of whom were captured. Despite continued resistance, by January 1900, notable engagements, such as the battle in Malabita, San Fernando, saw Filipino forces ambushing and repelling American troops with support from La Union Insurrect Governor Lucino Almeida.

By April 1900, San Fernando was effectively pacified with the aid of Crispulo Patajo, a native of Bauang who served as a spy, scout, and leader for U.S. forces in suppressing guerrilla resistance. His efforts led to the elimination of a guerrilla company and the capture of 80 rifles. By May 1, 1901, the Tinio Brigade formally surrendered to the Americans in Ilocos Sur.

On August 14, 1901, Governor General William Howard Taft arrived in San Fernando, introducing American civil governance. Shortly after, Don Joaquin Ortega was appointed as La Union's first Civil Governor. However, resistance persisted, and on November 8, 1901, Colonel Juan M. Gutierrez was publicly executed in the town plaza of San Fernando. Despite these hardships, American rule replaced Spanish governance with democratic institutions and economic reforms.

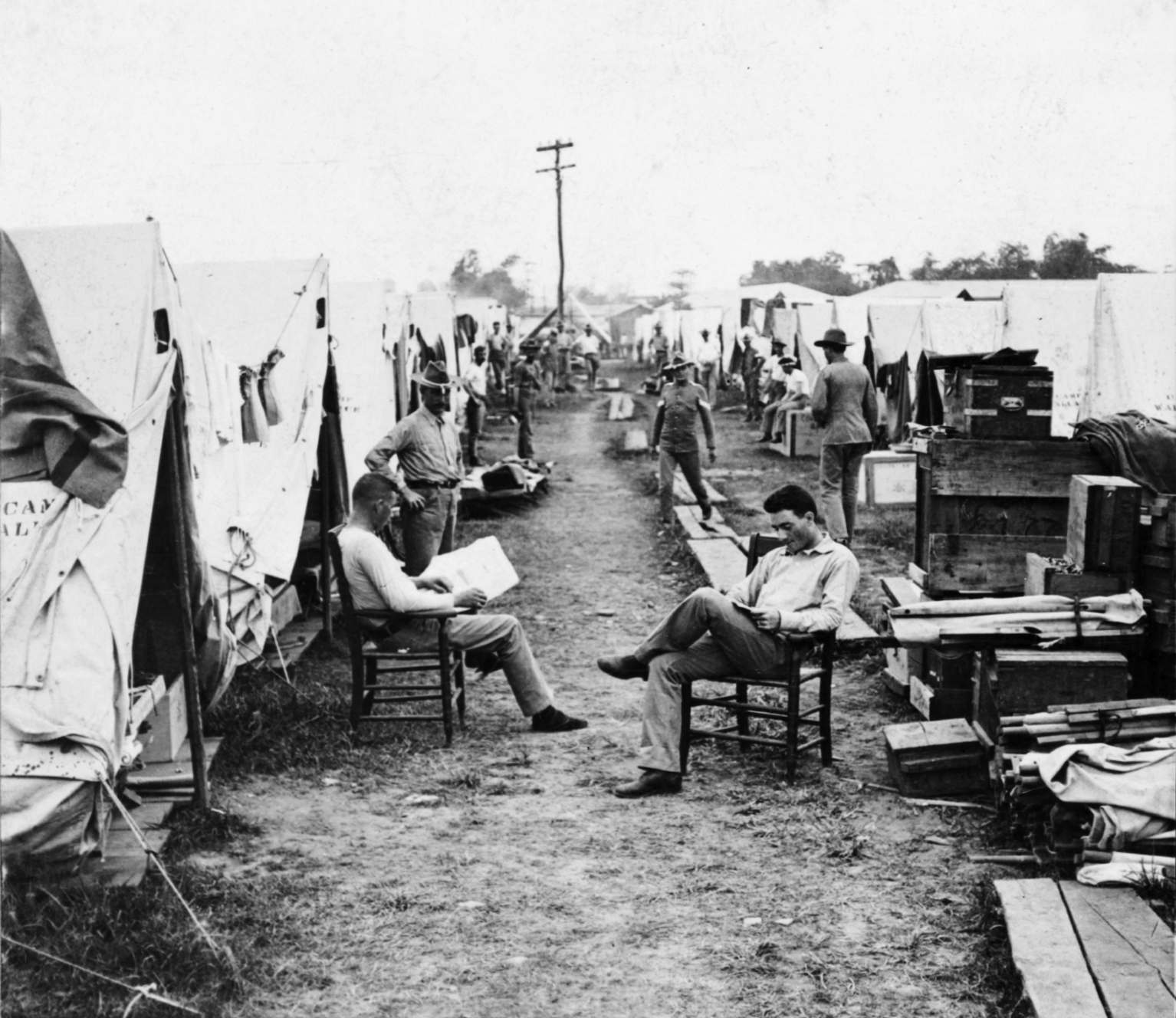
22nd U.S. Infantry at Camp Wallace, circa 1902

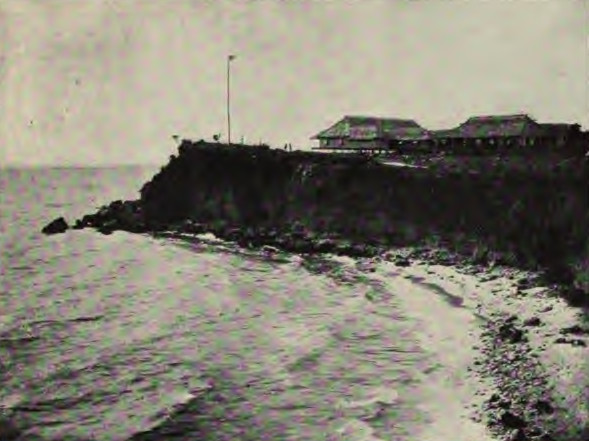
American Military Post, Camp Wallace, circa 1904.

When the American take over it significant changes in education, agriculture, healthcare, suffrage, and civil rights, fostering Filipino participation in governance. The arrival of American educators, known as Thomasites, led to the establishment of public schools, often utilizing abandoned Spanish convents in San Fernando. Civil government institutions, including a provincial capitol and public health offices, were also established to address health crises such as cholera outbreaks, contributing to broader Americanization efforts in the town.

Infrastructure development was a key aspect of American rule, with the construction of roads, ports, railways, and airports aimed at consolidating colonial administration and promoting economic growth. Notable projects included the establishment of Camp Wallace in 1903 on Poro Islet under Captain Frank Tompkins, which served as a strategic military reservation. Additionally, the San Fernando Wharf, constructed in 1921, played a crucial role in trade and military logistics.

The establishment of the Philippine Commonwealth in 1935 granted San Fernando increased political autonomy while maintaining American influence. This period saw efforts to promote local governance and economic development, though colonial structures remained largely intact. Full independence was achieved on July 4, 1946, with the formal recognition of Philippine sovereignty.

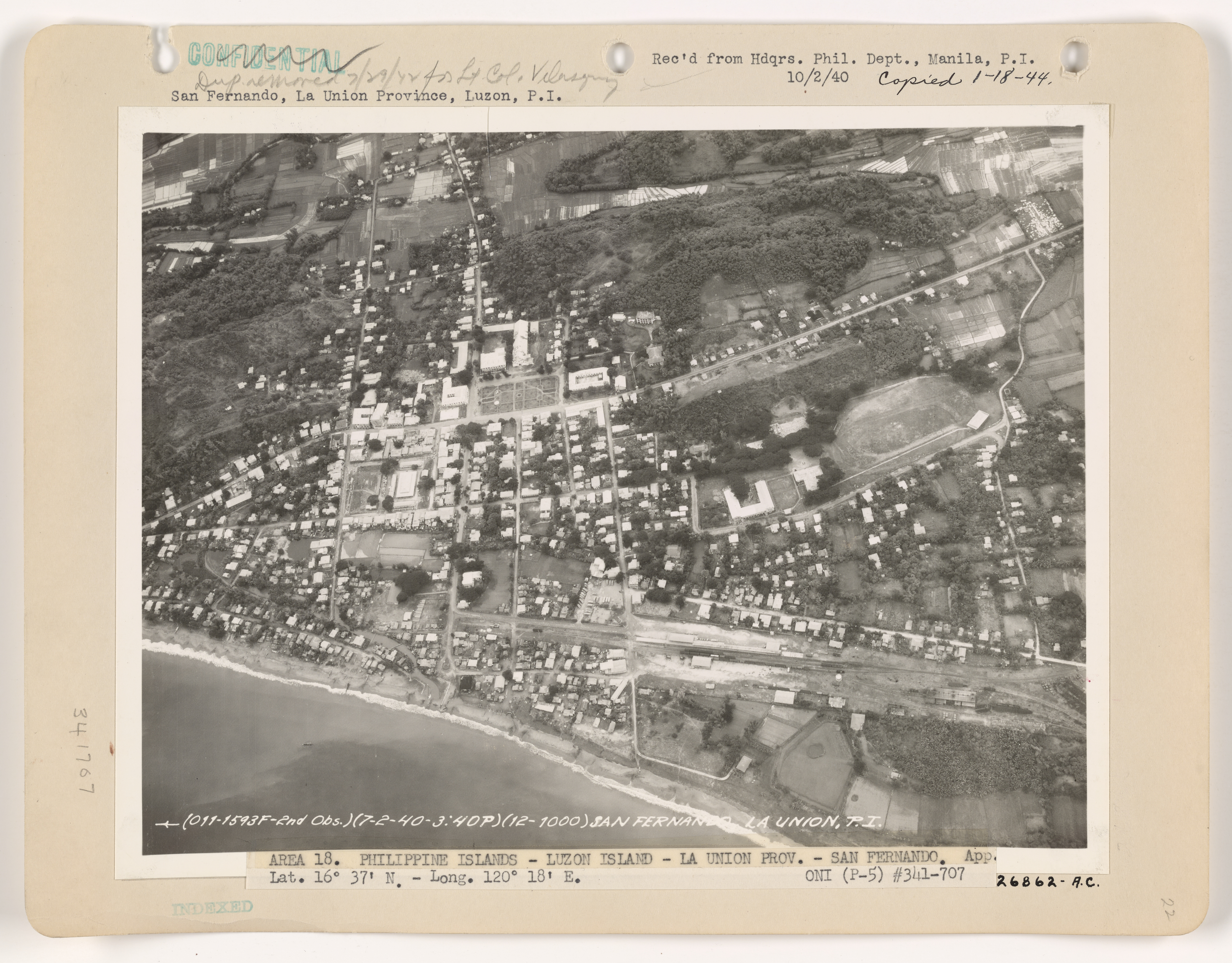
San Fernando town proper, aerial view, circa 1940

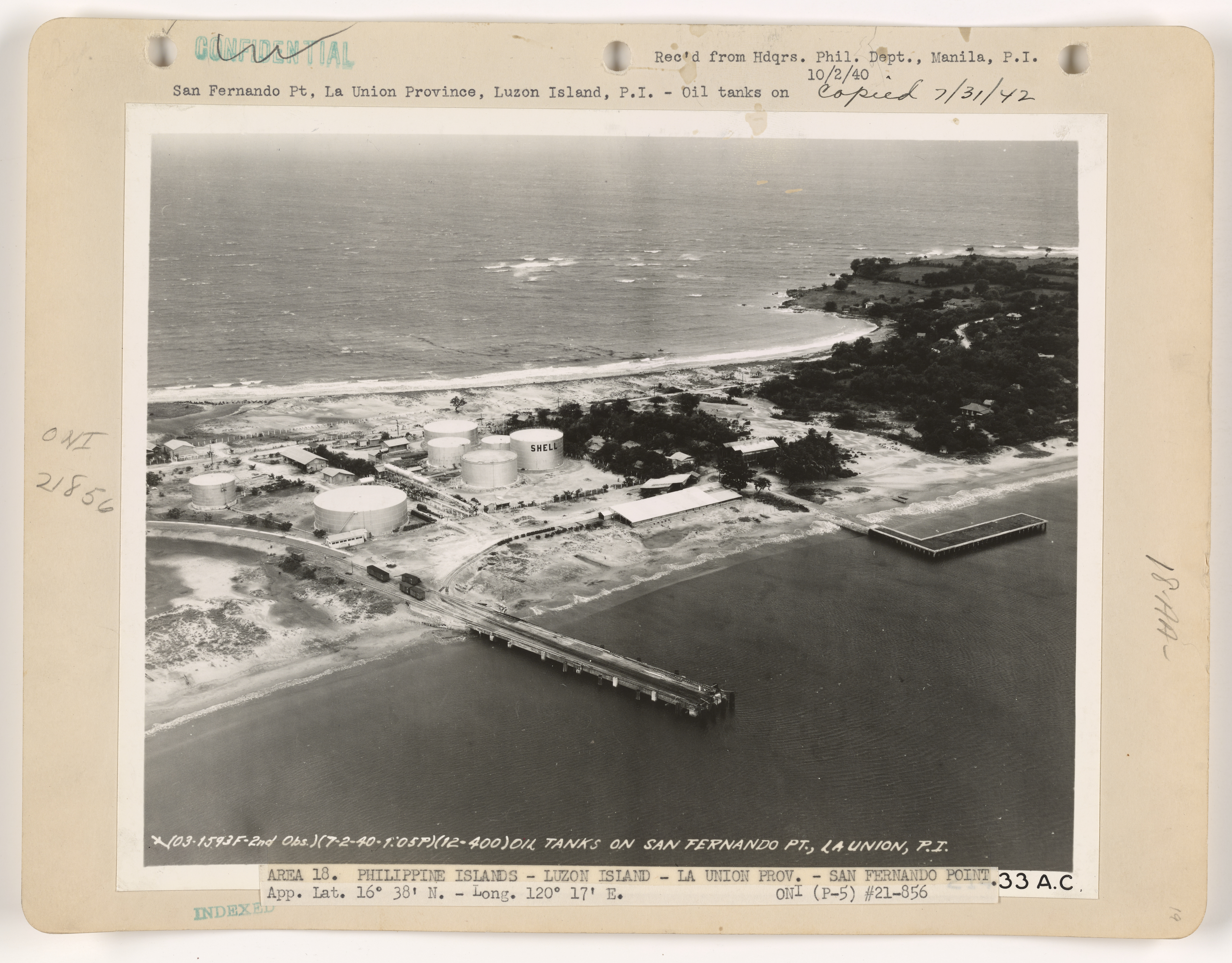
Poro Point Harbor, circa 1940

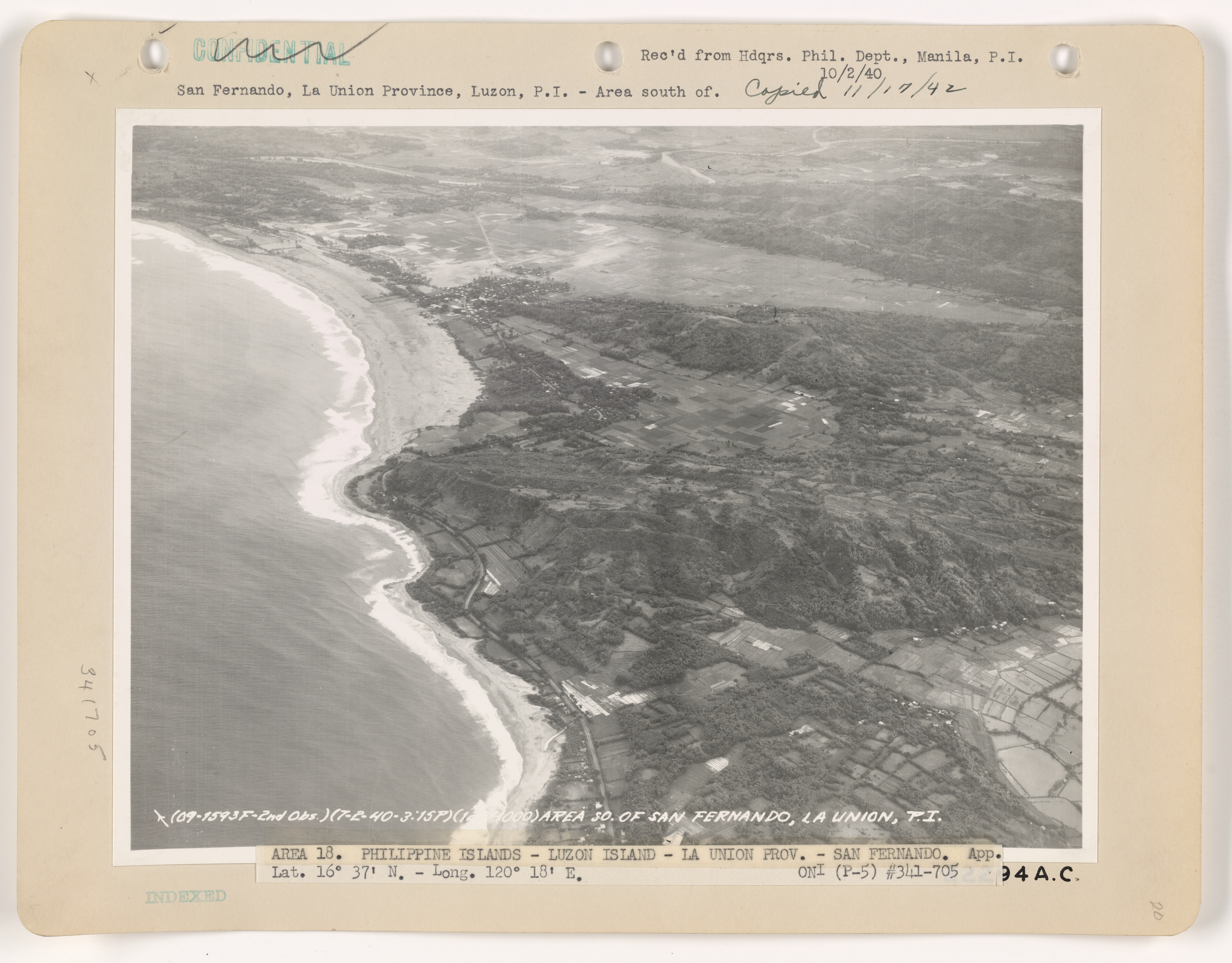
San Fernando and San Juan, aerial view, circa 1940

=== World War II ===
In the Second World War, the last battle of San Fernando was fought during the Japanese occupation at Barangay Bacsil. The Bacsil Ridge Monument was built on the site in the city, the north-eastern portion of the town plaza. The victory enabled the establishment of the United States Army Base, Base M at Poro Point (a buildup area for the Japan invasion) and a US Navy Base. The town was liberated in 1945.

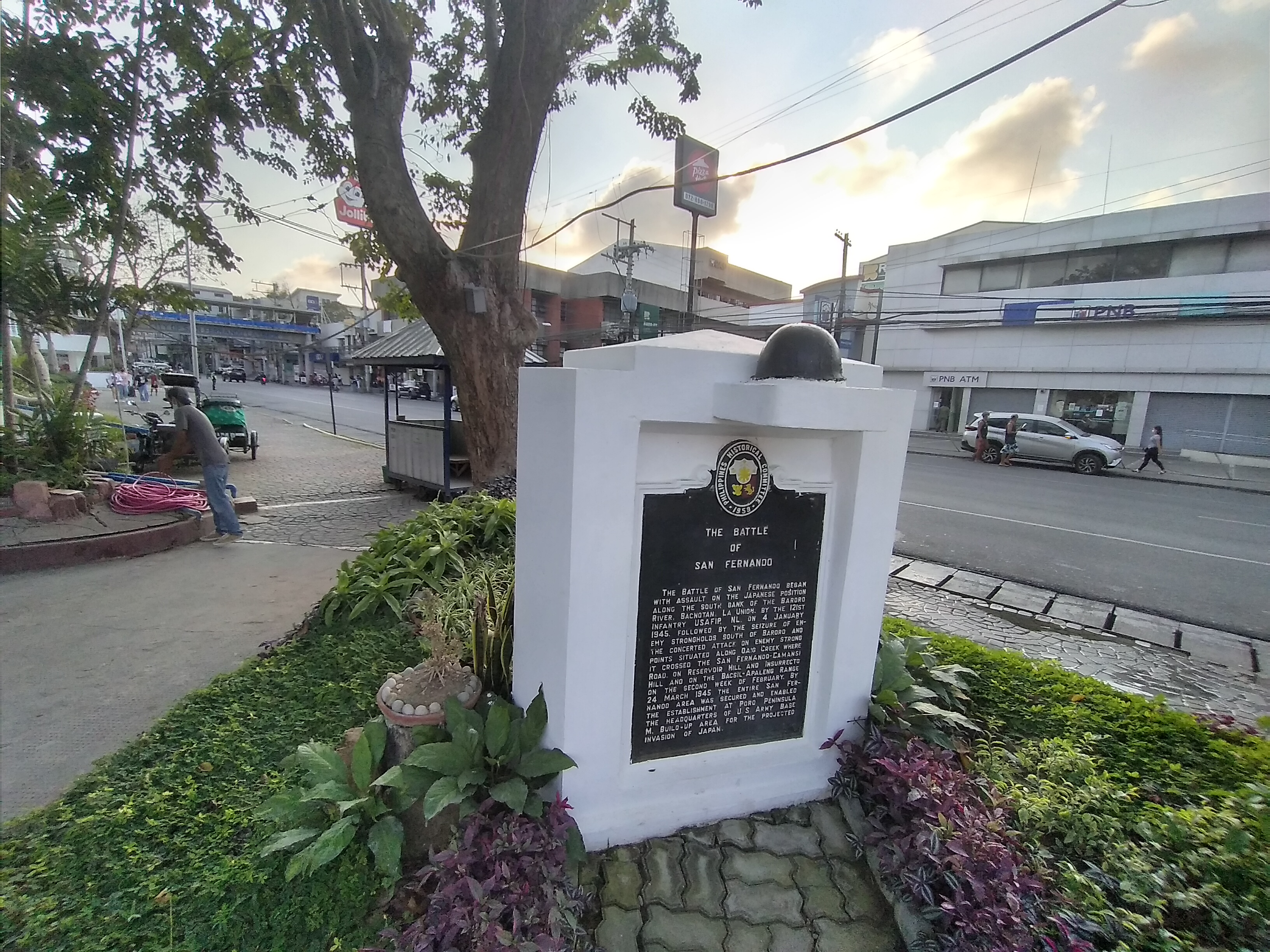
Vicinity of the NHCP Historical Marker for the Battle of San Fernando

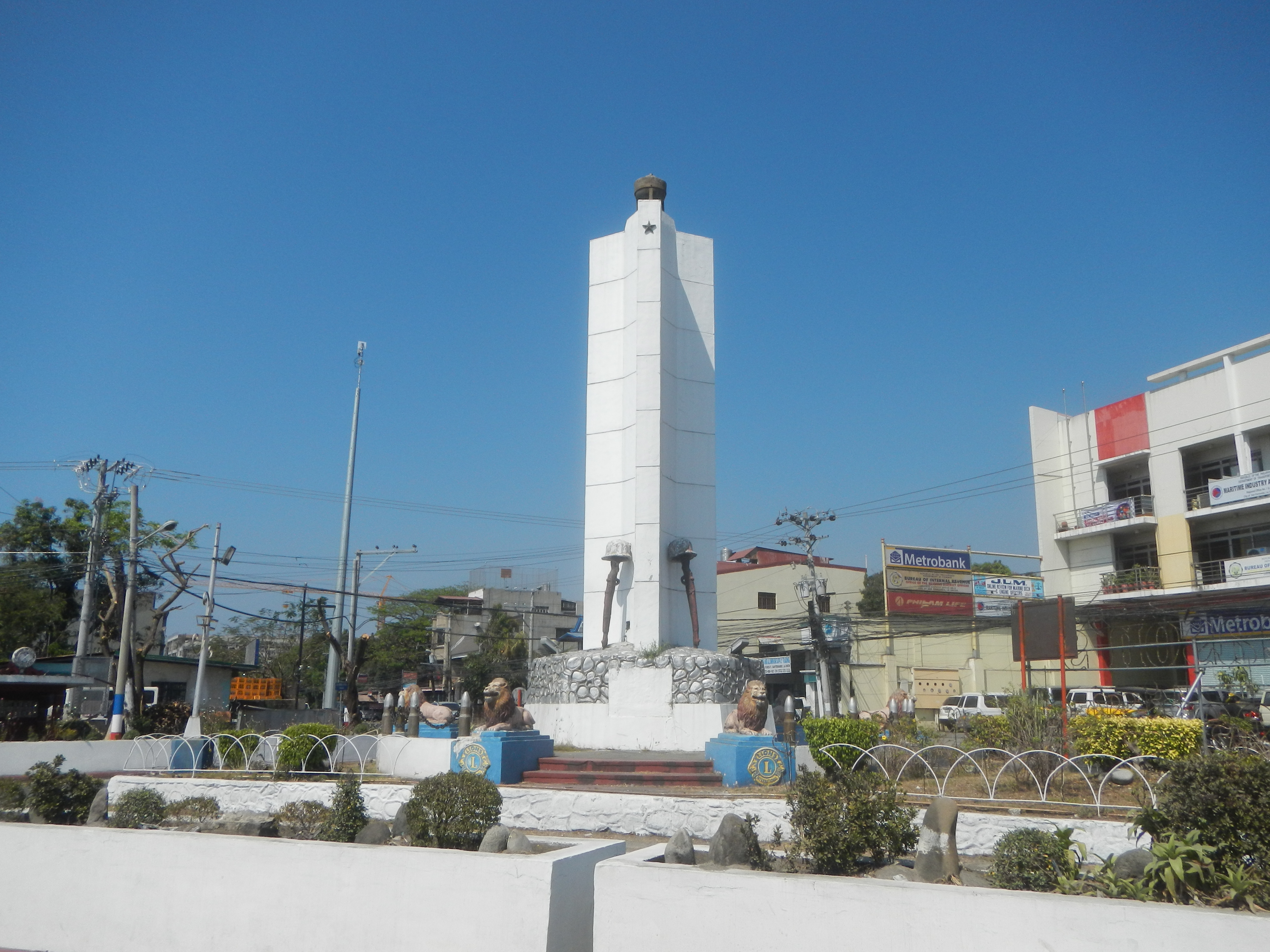
The Monument of the Tomb of the Unknown Soldiers

Bacsil Ridge historical marker

==== The Battle of Bacsil Ridge ====
The Battle of Bacsil Ridge which was fought in March 1945 was one of the main battles of the Philippines Campaign of the Second World War between the Filipino soldiers under the 121st Infantry Regiment, Philippine Commonwealth Army, USAFIP-NL, under the command of Russell W. Volckmann, and the Japanese Imperial forces under General Tomoyuki Yamashita.

The Battle of Bacsil Ridge ended the month-long battle for control of San Fernando. The Japanese defenders called the Hayashi Detachment, composed of 3,000 armed troops and 2,000 unarmed support forces, took hold of San Fernando and its surrounding areas and denied entry to the port of the city and a road leading to Baguio. As part of the San Fernando-Bacsil Operations, the 1st Battalion of 121st Infantry were sent to loosen the enemy positions starting late February with the assistance of the Allied Air Force.

The 1st Battalion made a general attack to the ridge on March 16, 1945 and fought the Japanese defenders until the capture of Bacsil on March 19. On the same day, the 3rd battalion captured Reservoir Hill. The Battle of Bacsil Ridge between the Filipino guerrillas and the Japanese Forces resulted in the recapture of the city of San Fernando, La Union. which resulted in the capture of San Fernando, La Union on March 23, 1945, and Bacnotan, La Union and the military offensive throughout the province ended on March 24 after two months of fighting.

=== Years leading up to Martial Law ===
By the 1970s San Fernando was more than a provincial town. It was La Union’s capital, the regional administrative center, a port and transport hub, and the main service center for much of the province. Government, commerce, schools, health services, and transport were all concentrated there, even though most people in the province still depended on agriculture. The town’s markets and politics stayed tied to rural incomes, so it was not a simple story of urban prosperity.

Politically, the town was run by an elite of politicians, officials, and businessmen. Leading politicians were often part of the economic elite too, and they sometimes shared influence with out-of-office figures who still held real decision-making power. Mayor Lorenzo Dacanay finishing the town hall in 1960-71 with the backing of Speaker Pro-Tempore Francisco Ortega shows how politics and public administration were intertwined.

Before martial law, the local candidates and supporters in La Union were divided into two competing factions, Liberal and Nacionalista parties. The lack of financial resources among lower to middle class individuals, which includes business owners, manual laborers, and white-collar workers, prevented them from being elected into government offices. The lack of class-based politics meant that no politicians could build a large following made up of underprivileged citizens.

Based on local context, the San Fernando, La Union community doesn’t make sense for the national martial law justifications and the town’s problems were ordinary, pre-existing factional competition, not a crisis requiring martial law. So the local evidence does not support these justifications, though it cannot show they were false everywhere.

The legal grounds of invasion or rebellion and a threat to public safety are not supported by the local evidence. The documented conflict was electoral rivalry among elite factions, and municipal government kept functioning, as seen in Mayor Dacanay’s completion of the town hall with Speaker Pro-Tempore Ortega’s backing. The historical justifications fare no better. The sources show no communist insurgency or Muslim separatist movement in San Fernando, and civil unrest is only weakly supported, since the rising violence came from competition among officials, not a citywide class movement.

The reform rationale identifies something real, an elite-dominated political system, but martial law did not dismantle it. It centralized authority and narrowed the space for media scrutiny and organized opposition, and regional research documents dissent and human-rights violations in the Ilocos.

=== Martial Law Era ===
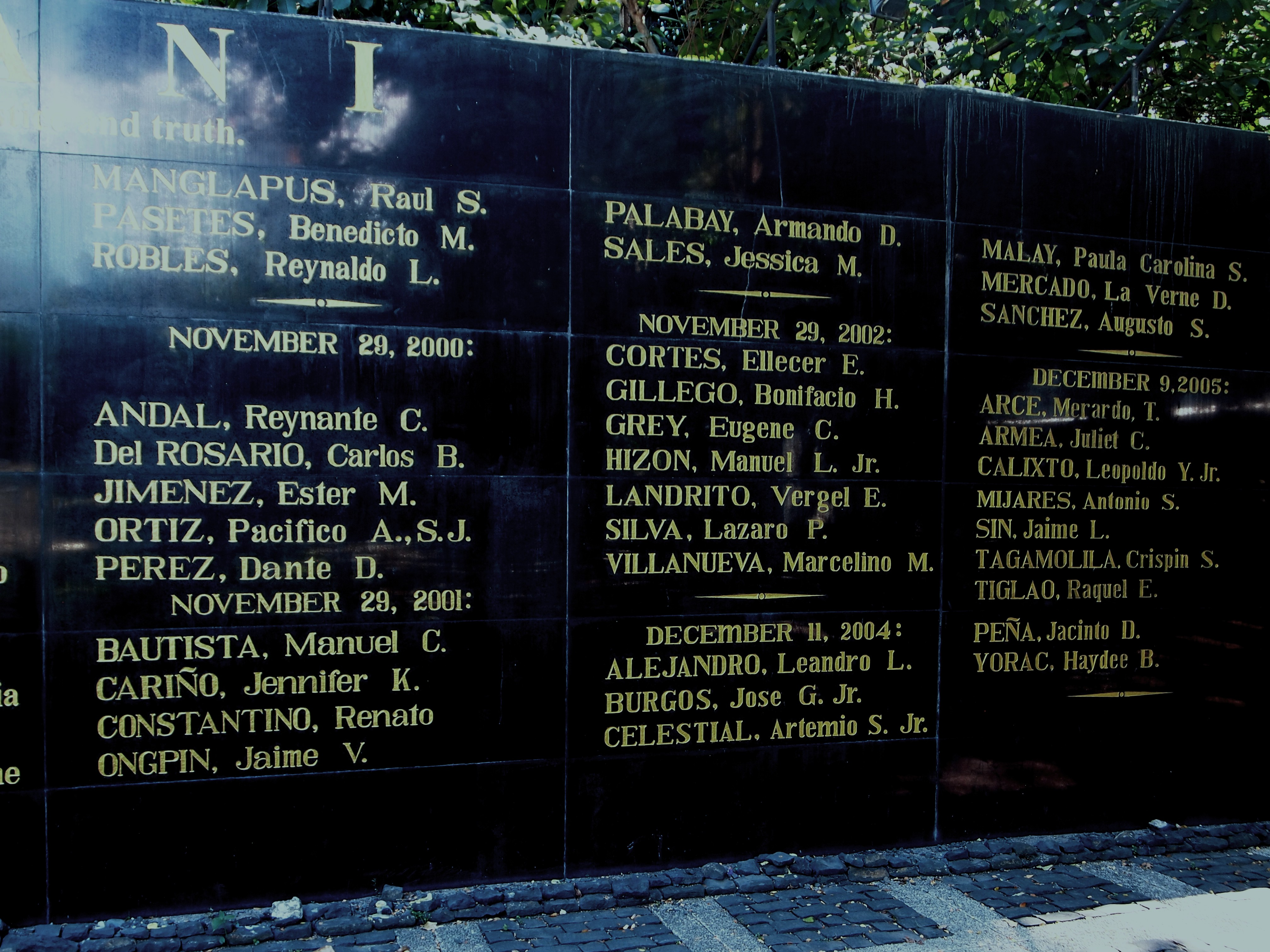
Bantayog ng mga Bayani including Armando Palabay

Although Ilocanos are perceived to have been largely silent about the authoritarian practices of Ferdinand Marcos' administration, there were still San Fernando residents willing to express their objections its various abuses. This included San Fernando-raised student activists Romulo and Armando Palabay, UP Students and La Union National High School alumni who were imprisoned for their protest activities in San Fernando, tortured at Camp Olivas in Pampanga, and later separately killed before the end of Martial Law.

The respective martyrdoms of Romulo (age 22) and Armando (age 21) were later honored when their names were etched on the Wall of Remembrance at the Philippines’ Bantayog ng mga Bayani, which honors the heroes and martyrs who fought the authoritarian regime.

=== Cityhood ===
On May 14, 1996, the Sangguniang Bayan of San Fernando passed Resolution No. 20, formally requesting the House of Representatives of the Philippines to convert the Municipality of San Fernando into a Component City. At that time, San Fernando had fulfilled the fundamental requirements for cityhood in accordance with the provisions of the Local Government Code of 1991. According to a certification from the Bureau of Local Government Finance, the municipality's average annual income for the calendar years 1994 and 1995, based on 1991 constant prices, was P 44,351,821.66. Additionally, the Land Management Bureau of the Department of Environment and Natural Resources certified that San Fernando covered a total land area of 10,526 hectares, exceeding the minimum requirement of 10,000 hectares.

Following a thorough review and careful assessment of the Sangguniang Bayan of San Fernando's petition, the Sangguniang Panlalawigan of La Union adopted Resolution No. 425-96, endorsing the cityhood bid to the House of Representatives.

House Bill No. 7594, entitled "An Act Converting the Municipality of San Fernando, La Union into a Component City to be Known as the City of San Fernando," was sponsored by Congressman Victor F. Ortega (1st District, La Union) and approved by the House of Representatives. The Senate subsequently approved the bill, sponsored by Senators Vicente Sotto III and Juan Flavier. On February 13, 1998, Republic Act No. 8509 was signed into law by President Fidel V. Ramos. Finally, on March 20, 1998, the residents of San Fernando overwhelmingly voted in favor of the law during a plebiscite, fulfilling the long-held aspiration for San Fernando to attain cityhood.

== Geography ==
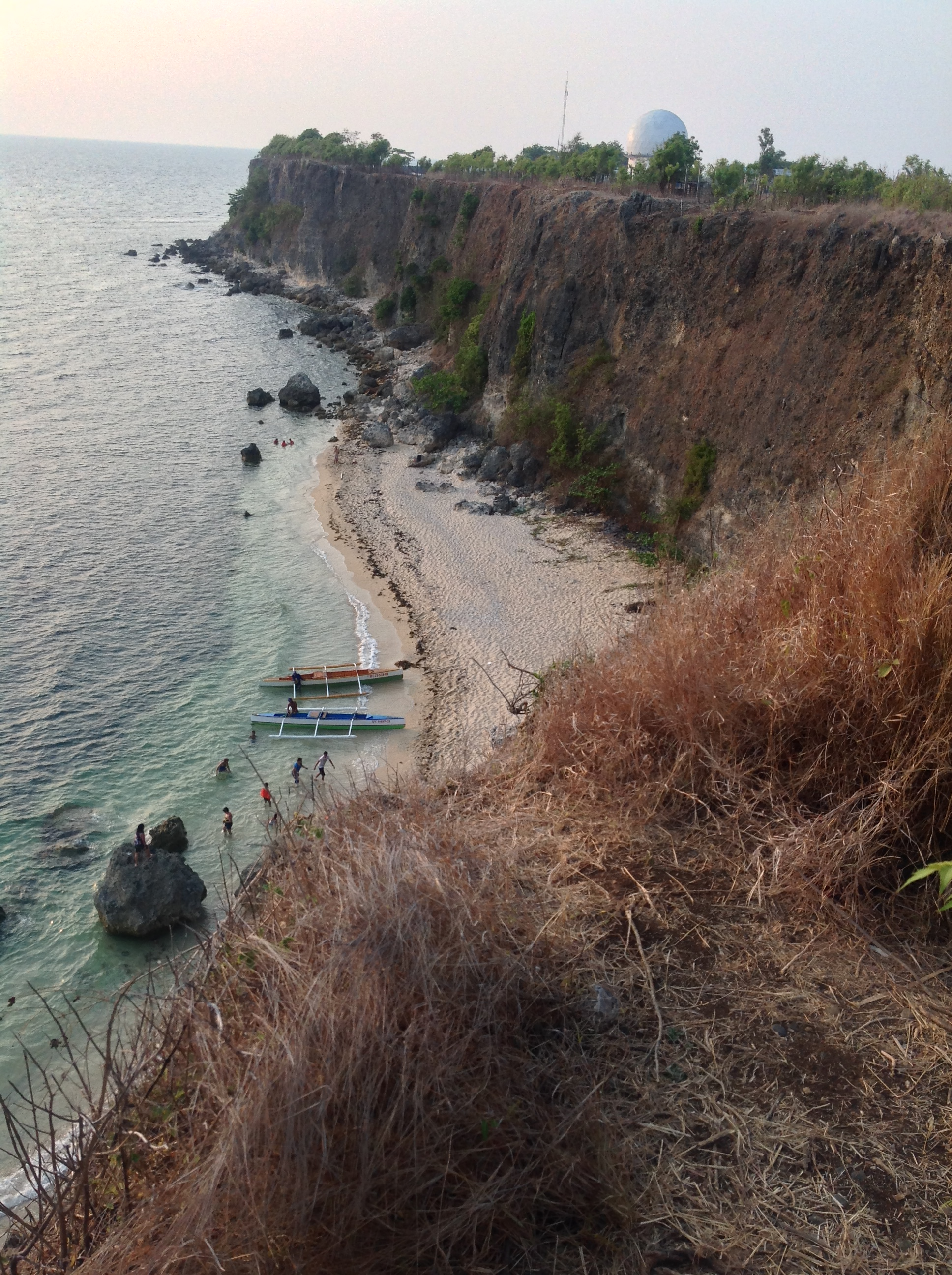
Sea Cliff at Poro Point Freeport Zone

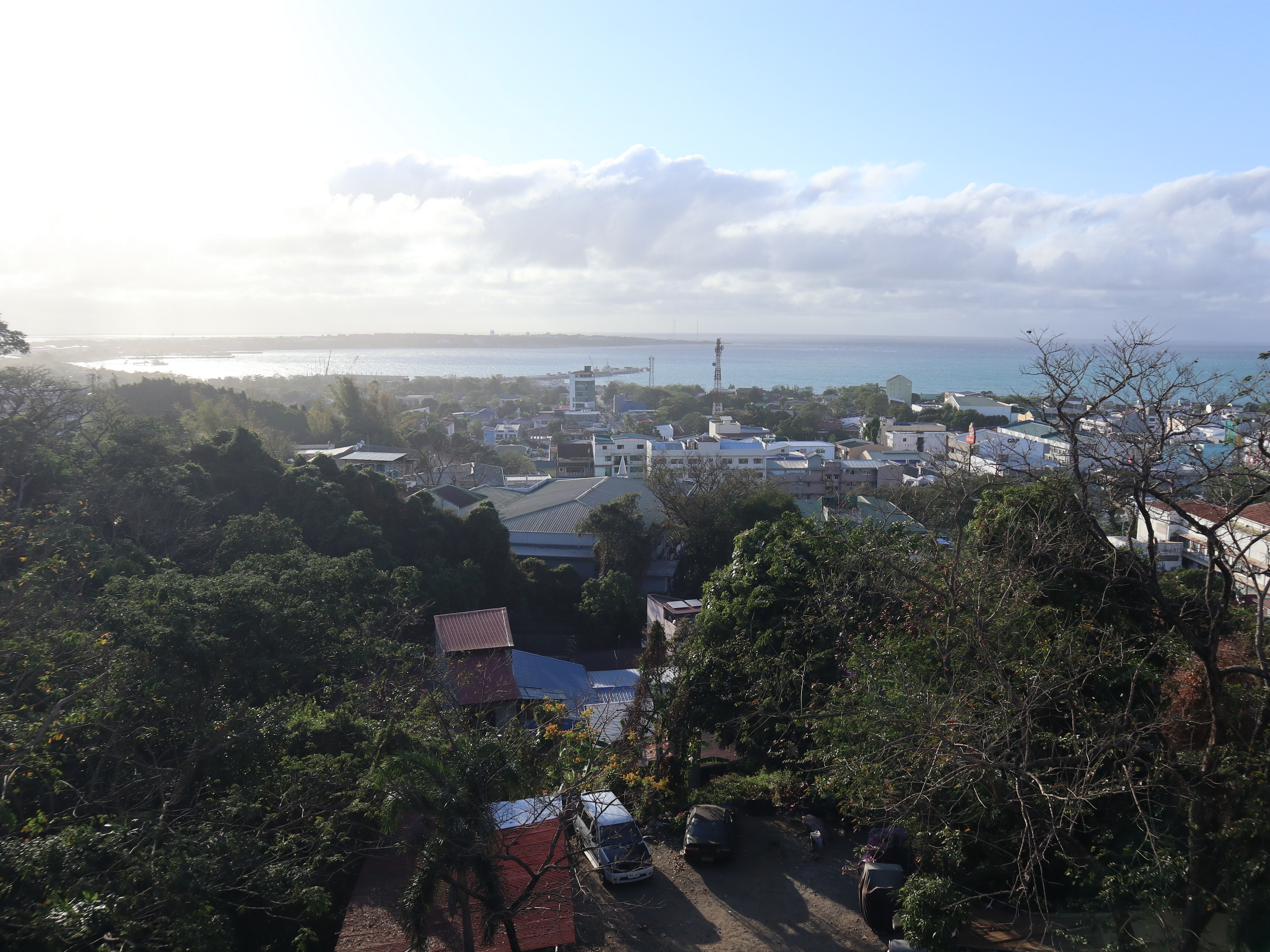
View overlooking the South China Sea

The City of San Fernando is located in the province of La Union, Philippines, and is situated near the central part of the province. It lies between the South China Sea to the west and the foothills of the Cordillera Central mountain range to the east. The city has a total land area of 10,526 hectares.

The city's topography is characterized by predominantly hilly terrain that gradually rises eastward from the coastal plains. It is traversed by several rivers and creeks, including the Carlatan and Catbangen rivers. The landscape also features scrublands, grasslands, wetlands, and is in proximity to seven mountains. San Fernando is bordered to the north by the municipality of San Juan, to the south by Bauang along the Pagdalagan River, to the east by Bagulin along the Balili River, and to the southeast by Naguilian.

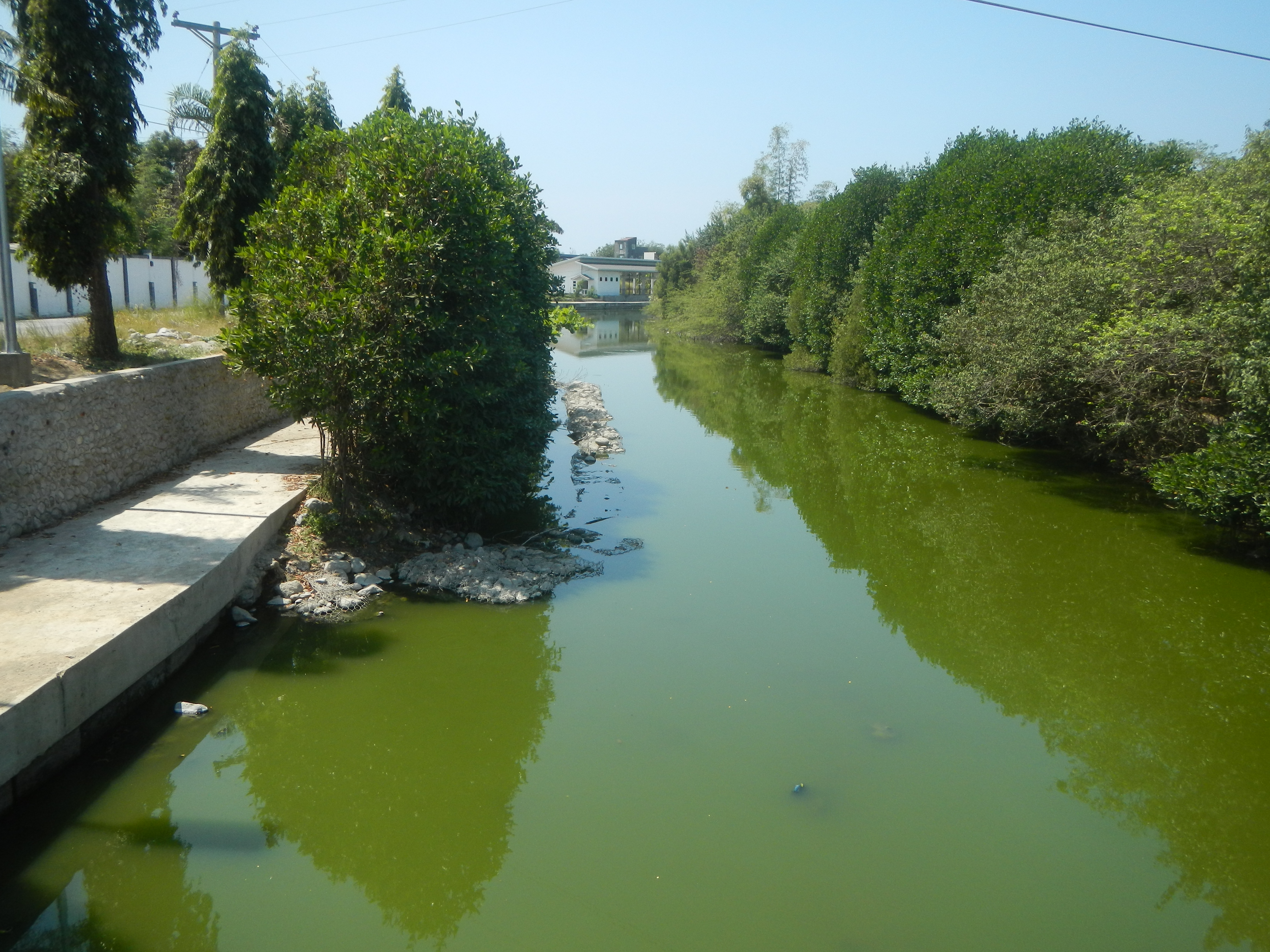
Creek in Catbangen

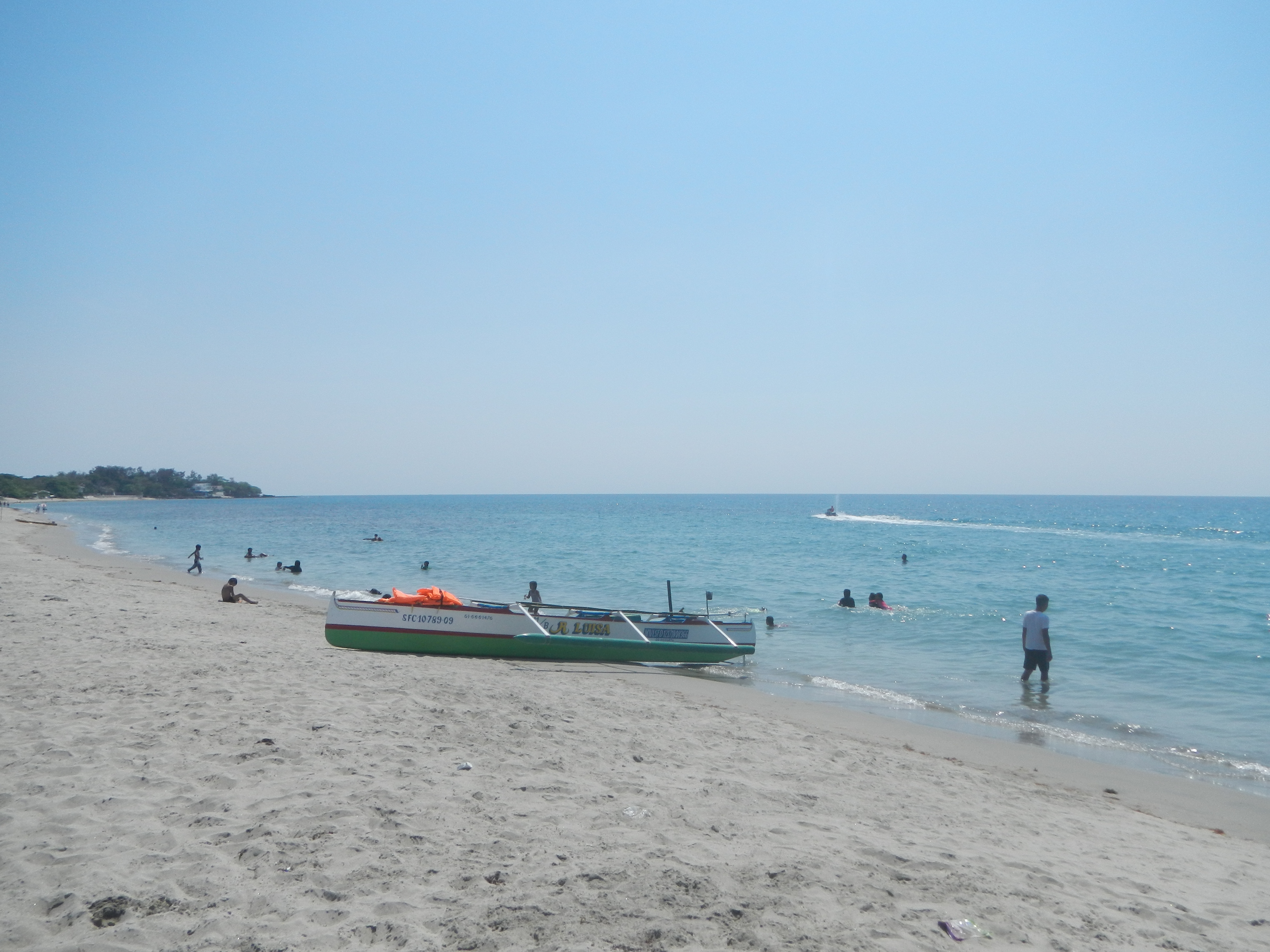
Acapulco Beach in San Francisco

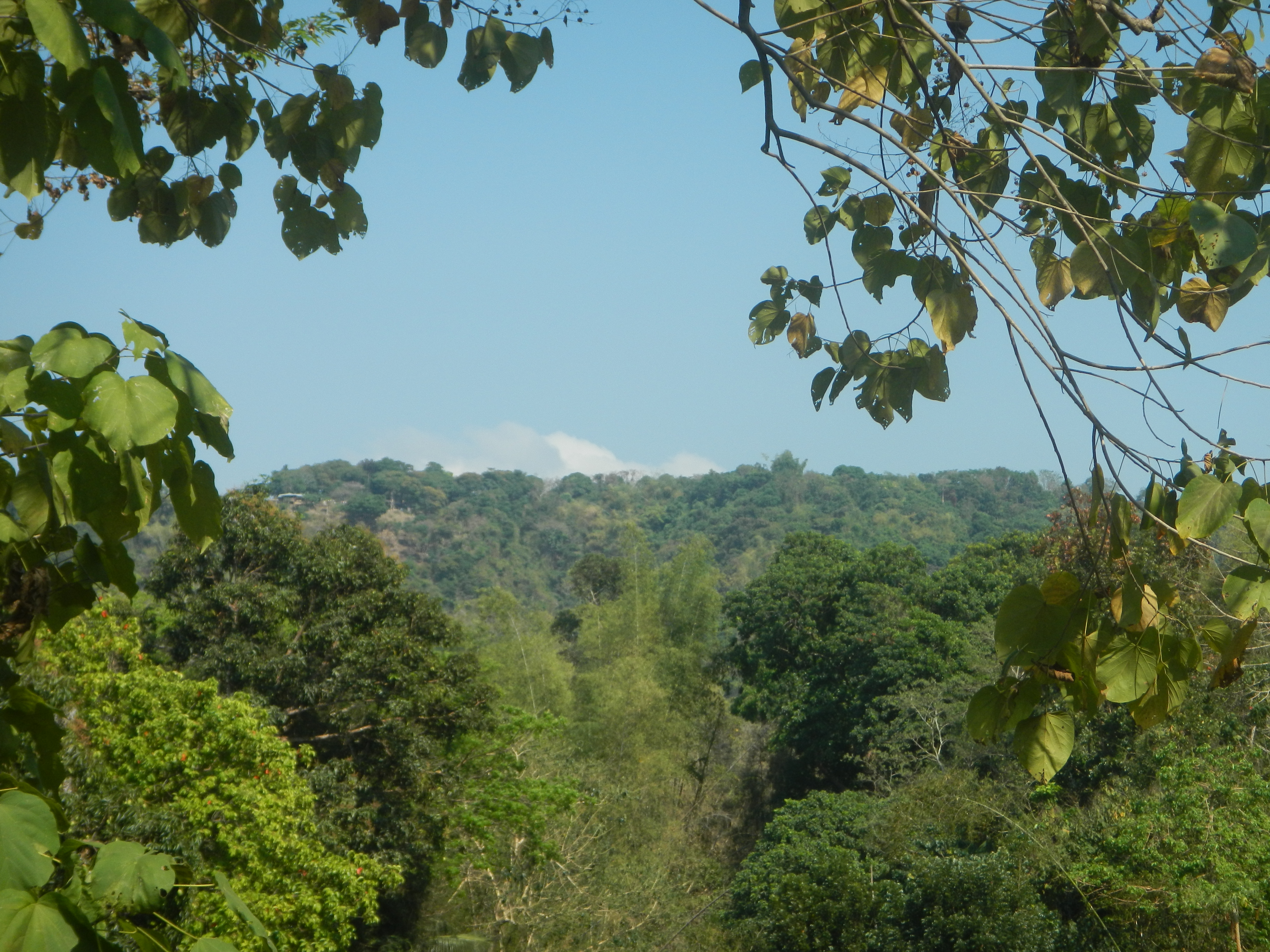
Mountain View in Pias

Within its jurisdiction, the Kasay Marine Protected Area stands out as a notable environmental feature. Situated along the southwest coastal area of Barangays Canaoay and San Vicente, this 30-hectare sanctuary was established in 2004. It boasts pristine white sand and serves as a crucial site for the rehabilitation and replenishment of fisheries and coastal resources. The area is renowned for its ecological significance, housing 50-year-old giant clams (Tridacna gigas) and coral formations estimated to be 70 to 100 years old.

San Fernando is situated 267.12 kilometres (165.98 mi) from the capital city of Manila.

=== Barangays ===
The city of San Fernando is divided into 59 barangays, which are organized into 12 districts. These barangays include 14 coastal, 31 inland, and 14 upland areas, and are further categorized into 34 rural and 25 urban barangays.

- Abut
- Apaleng
- Bacsil
- Bangbangolan
- Bangcusay
- Barangay I (Poblacion)
- Barangay II (Poblacion)
- Barangay III (Poblacion)
- Barangay IV (Poblacion)
- Baraoas
- Bato
- Biday
- Birunget
- Bungro
- Cabaroan (Negro)
- Cabarsican
- Cadaclan
- Calabugao
- Camansi
- Canaoay
- Carlatan
- Catbangen
- Dallangayan Este
- Dallangayan Oeste
- Dalumpinas Este
- Dalumpinas Oeste
- Ilocanos Norte
- Ilocanos Sur
- Langcuas
- Lingsat
- Madayegdeg
- Mameltac
- Masicong
- Nagyubuyuban
- Namtutan
- Narra Este
- Narra Oeste
- Pacpaco
- Pagdalagan
- Pagdaraoan
- Pagudpud
- Pao Norte
- Pao Sur
- Parian
- Pias
- Poro
- Puspus
- Sacyud
- Sagayad
- San Agustin
- San Francisco
- San Vicente
- Santiago Norte
- Santiago Sur
- Saoay
- Sevilla
- Siboan-Otong
- Tanqui
- Tanquigan

=== Climate ===
The City has a Type I climate, characterized by distinct dry and wet seasons. The wet season typically commences in mid-May and concludes at the end of October, while the dry season occurs from December to early May.

Climate data for San Fernando City, La Union
Month	Jan	Feb	Mar	Apr	May	Jun	Jul	Aug	Sep	Oct	Nov	Dec	Year
Mean daily maximum °C (°F)	31 (88)	31 (88)	33 (91)	33 (91)	32 (90)	31 (88)	30 (86)	30 (86)	30 (86)	31 (88)	31 (88)	31 (88)	31 (88)
Mean daily minimum °C (°F)	21 (70)	22 (72)	23 (73)	25 (77)	26 (79)	26 (79)	26 (79)	26 (79)	25 (77)	24 (75)	23 (73)	22 (72)	24 (75)
Average precipitation mm (inches)	42 (1.7)	48 (1.9)	74 (2.9)	110 (4.3)	269 (10.6)	275 (10.8)	362 (14.3)	325 (12.8)	330 (13.0)	306 (12.0)	126 (5.0)	61 (2.4)	2,328 (91.7)
Average rainy days	11.2	12.0	17.1	21.2	27.1	26.8	28.1	27.0	26.0	24.5	17.7	12.4	251.1
Source: Meteoblue (modeled/calculated data, not measured locally)

== Demographics ==
=== Population ===
Population census of San Fernando

Year	Pop.	±% p.a.
1903	16,095	—
1918	19,881	+1.42%
1939	23,366	+0.77%
1948	28,742	+2.33%
1960	37,836	+2.32%
1970	52,597	+3.34%
1975	61,166	+3.07%
1980	68,410	+2.26%

Year	Pop.	±% p.a.
1990	84,949	+2.19%
1995	91,943	+1.49%
2000	102,082	+2.27%
2007	114,813	+1.63%
2010	114,963	+0.05%
2015	121,812	+1.11%
2020	125,640	+0.65%
2024	124,809	−0.16%

Source: Philippine Statistics Authority

The population of the City of San Fernando was recorded at 124,809 people, according to the 2024 Census of Population and Housing, with an annual growth rate of −0.16% observed from 2020 to 2024. This accounts for 15.28% of the total population of La Union and 2.37% of the overall population of the Ilocos Region. Consequently, the city's population density is calculated at 1,223 individuals per square kilometer (or 3,168 individuals per square mile).

Sevilla is the most populous barangay, with 11,316 residents, followed by Catbangen (9,638), Lingsat (7,528), Poro (6,797), Tanqui (5,281), Biday (4,421), Santiago Norte (4,085), Cabaroan (3,660), San Francisco (3,653), and Parian (3,561).

The gender distribution in the city is nearly equal, with males accounting for 49.9% (62,134) of the population and females comprising 50.1% (62,360). In terms of age distribution, 25% of the population (31,088 individuals) is aged 0–14 years, while 67.4% (83,971 individuals) falls within the working-age category of 15–64 years. Senior citizens aged 65 and above represent 8% (9,435 individuals) of the total population. The population pyramid reflects a balanced gender distribution, predominantly featuring individuals within the working-age group.

In the 2022 elections, the voting age population (18 years and over) accounted for 69.71 percent of the household population or 76,555 registered voters, as reported by the Commission on Elections.

=== Religion ===
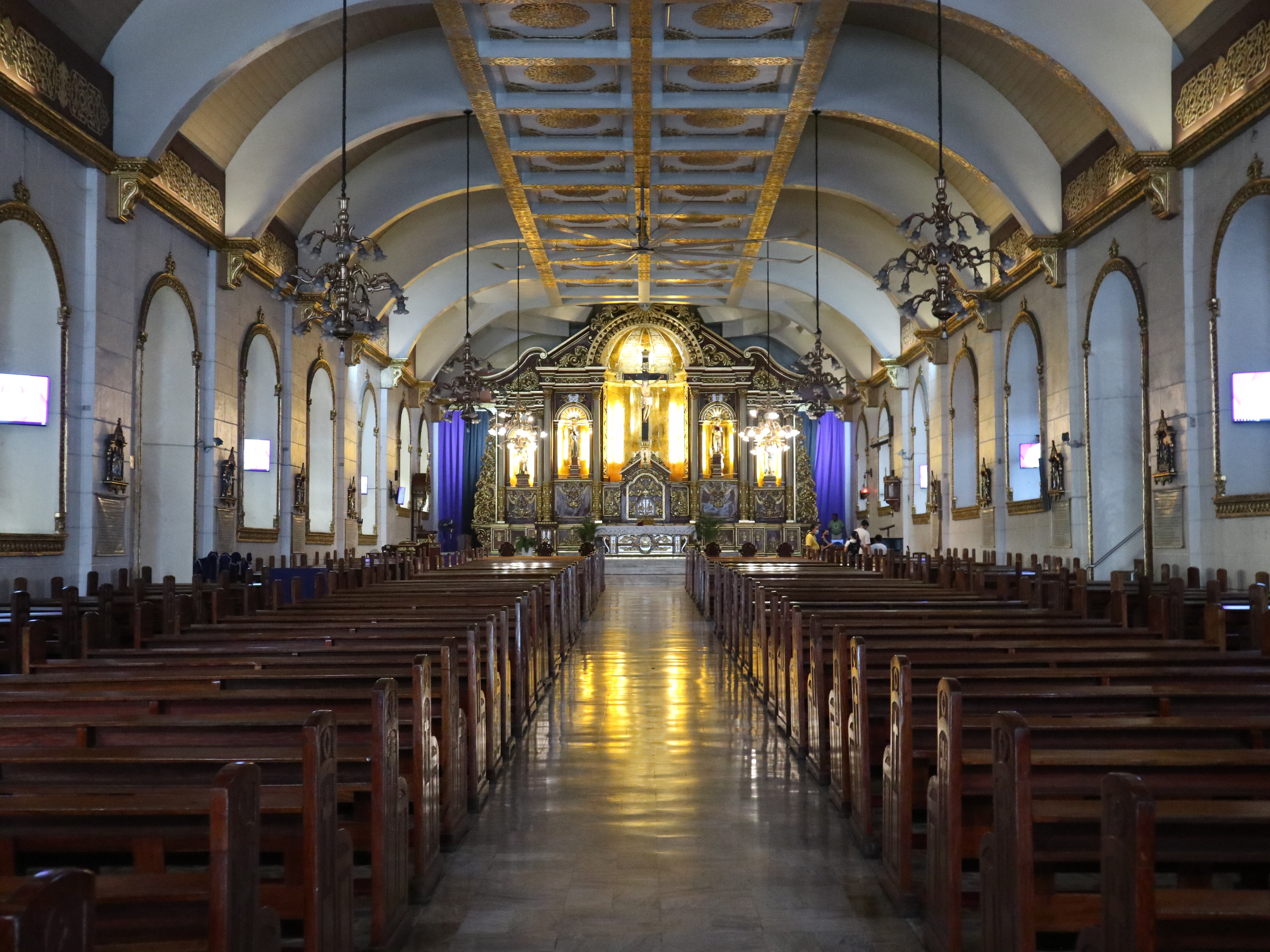
Cathedral of Saint William the Hermit

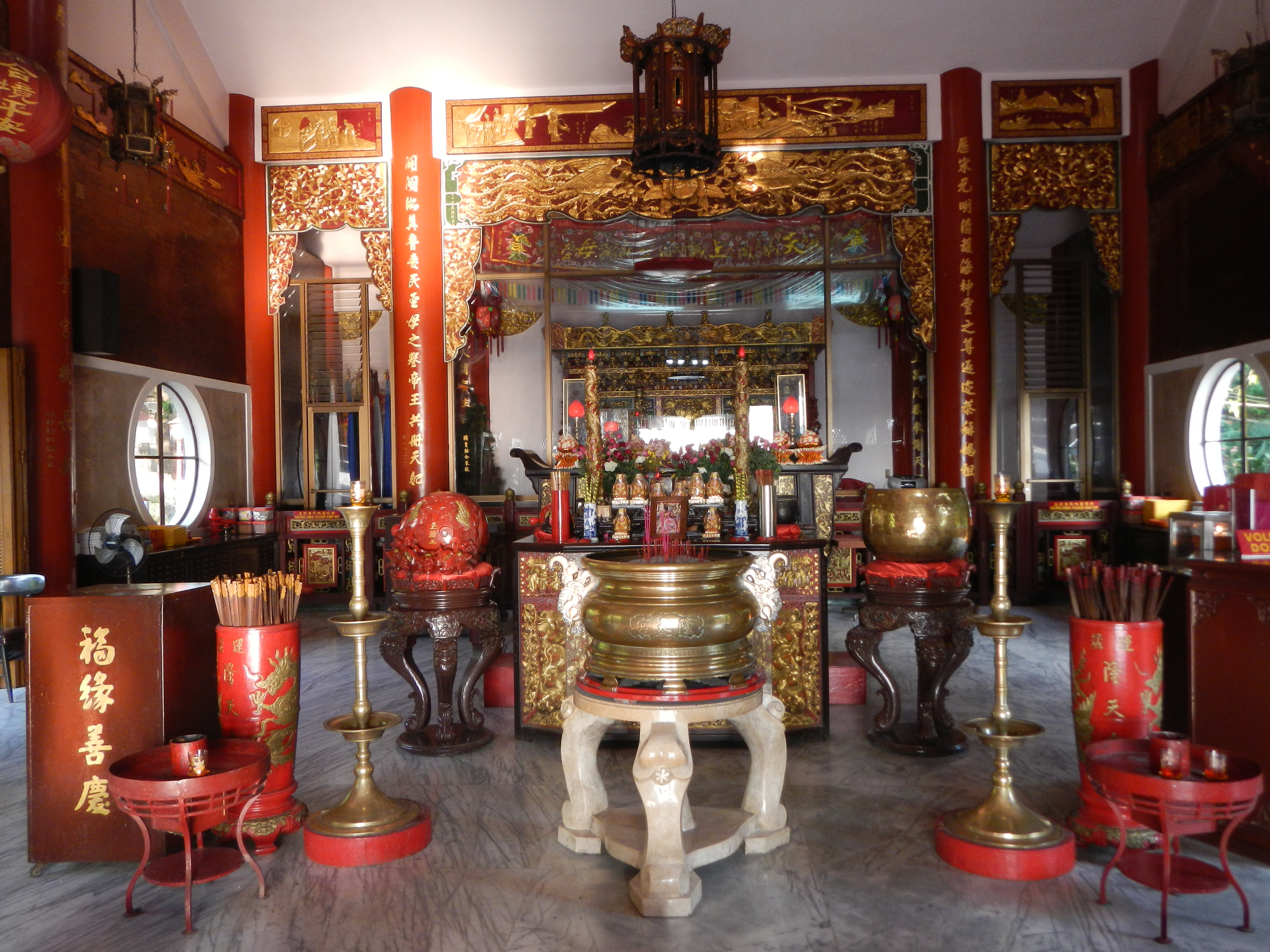
Ma-Cho Temple (Taoist Temple)

The majority of the city's population, 89.43%, identifies as Roman Catholic, followed by Iglesia ni Cristo (2.95%) and Evangelicals (2.28%), with other Christian denominations comprising smaller percentages. Other religious groups present in the city include Islam, Taoism, Buddhism, and Hinduism, as well as various Christian denominations such as Aglipayan Church, Jehovah's Witnesses, the Pentecostal Church of God Asia Mission, the Bible Baptist Church, the Church of Jesus Christ of Latter-day Saints, the United Church of Christ in the Philippines, and the Seventh-day Adventist Church.

=== Language ===
Iloco (or Ilocano) is the primary language spoken in the city and has been recognized as the official language of both the city and the province since 2012. While Filipino and English are also official languages, English serves as the primary medium of instruction in the city schools and government. Other regional languages spoken in the city include Pangasinan, Kankanaey, Ibaloi, Cebuano, Waray-waray, and others.

=== Ethnicity ===
The majority of the city's population consists of Ilocanos, as the city has historically been a center of Ilocano culture. Other ethnolinguistic groups present include the indigenous Bago (Bag-o) and Kankanaey peoples from the highland areas of the city. Additionally, the city is home to various other groups such as Tagalog, Pangasinan, and Cordilleran (Igorot) communities, including Ibaloi, Tinguian, and Ifugao. Other Filipino ethnolinguistic groups, such as Kapampangan, Cebuano (Bisayan), Hiligaynon, Waray, and Maranao, are also present. The city is also home to international ethnic communities, including Chinese, Indian, American, and Arab residents.

== Education ==
The San Fernando City Schools Division Office governs the educational institutions within the city. There are two schools district office which govern the operations of private and public elementary and high schools. These are San Fernando I Schools District Office, and San Fernando II Schools District Office.

The city has 58 educational institutions, comprising 28 public elementary schools, 8 public high schools (junior and senior high schools or integrated schools), and 22 private schools offering various levels of education from elementary to senior high school, based on the 2022 Department of Education (DepEd) Masterlist of Schools as of the 2021–2022 school year. The city is also home to one state university campus, the Don Mariano Marcos Memorial State University-Mid La Union Campus (DMMMSU-MLUC), which provides education to children and young adults in the area. Vocational education is also present in city with Technical Education and Skills Development Authority (TESDA).

The city had posted a literacy rate of 99.48 percent as of 2020. Among those with academic degree, females (57.97%), outnumbered males (44.03%). In 2010, approximately 1.85% of the city's student population had not completed any grade level.

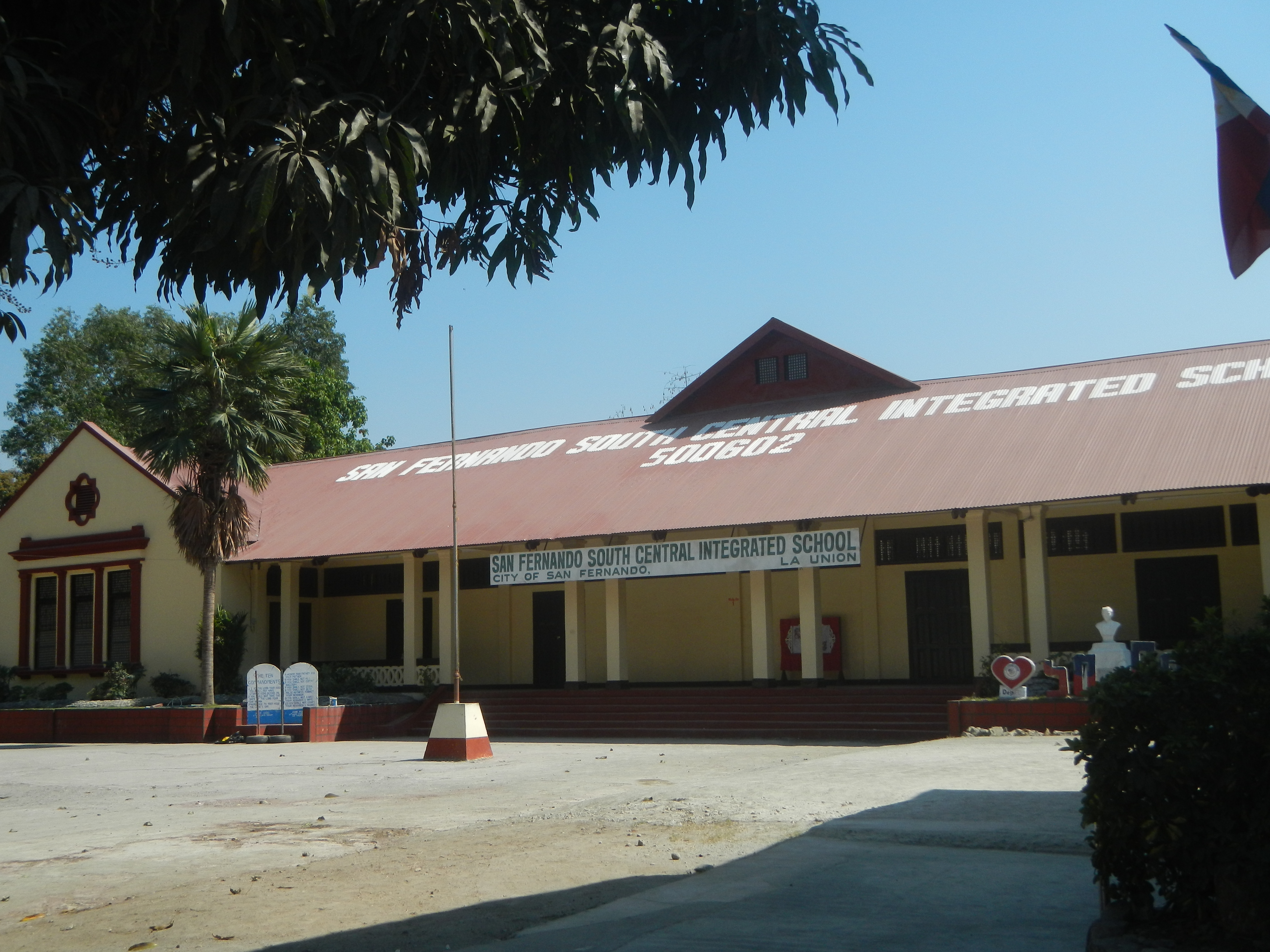
San Fernando South Central Integrated School

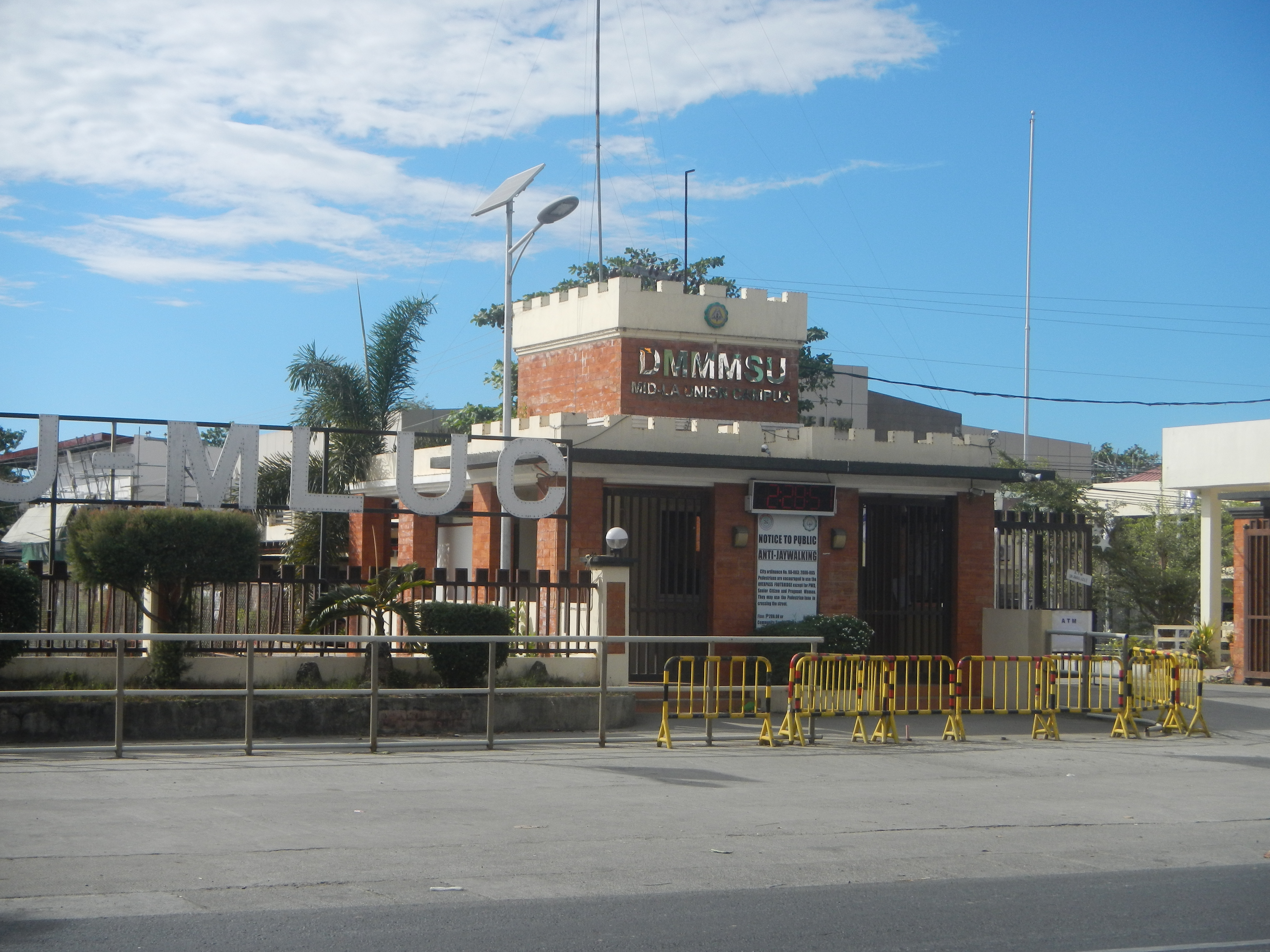
Don Mariano Marcos Memorial State University-Mid La Union Campus

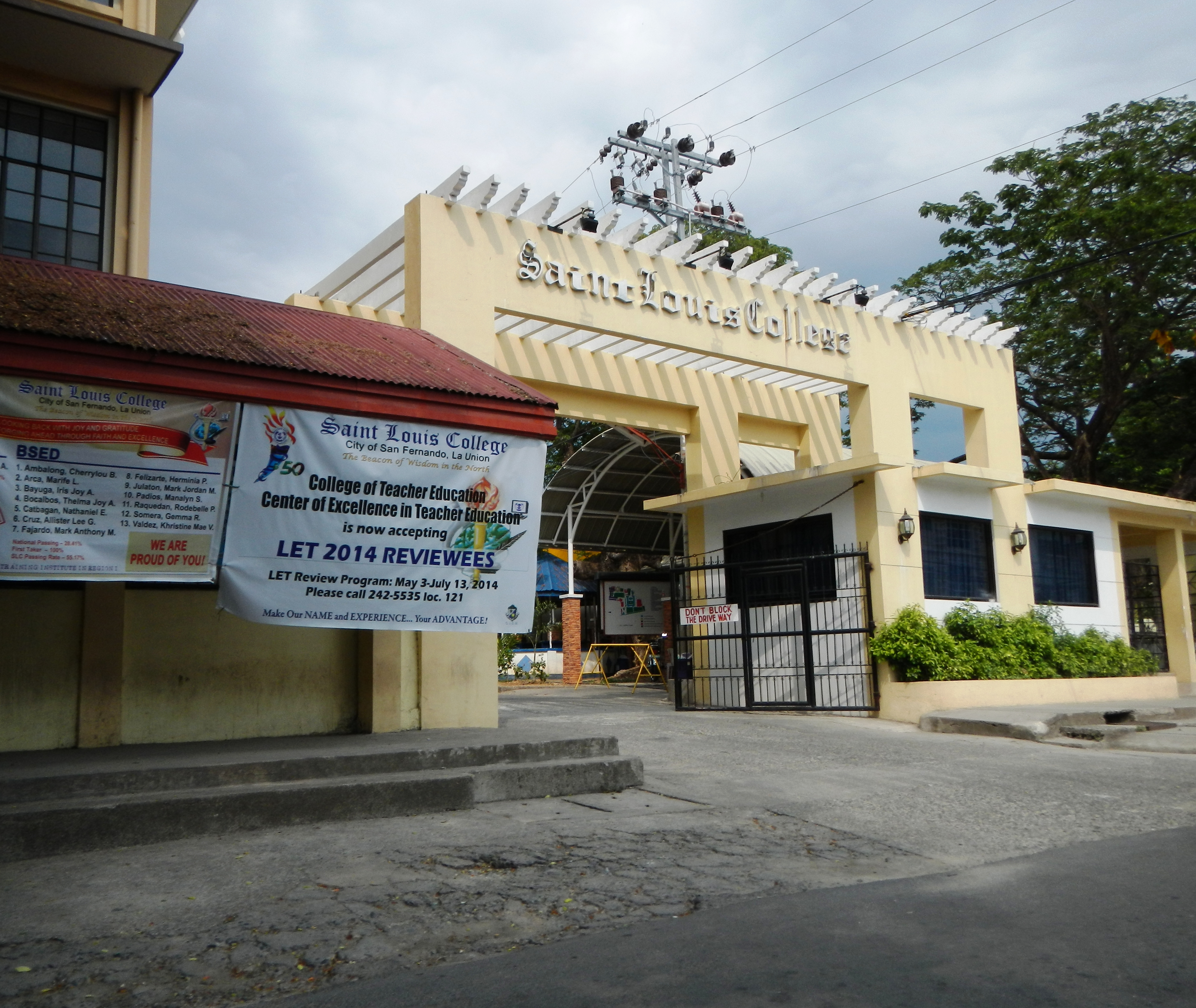
Saint Louis College

=== Primary and elementary schools ===
These are the list comprising both private and public schools.

- Adventist School
- Bangbangolan Elementary School
- Baraoas Elementary School
- BHC Educational Institution (Elementary)
- Bright Beginnings Learning Center
- Bungro Elementary School
- Cadaclan Elementary School
- Canaoay Elementary School
- Catbangen Central School
- Capitol Church Nursery Kindergarten School
- Champions Academy
- Christ the King College (Elementary)
- Dallangayan Elementary School
- Dalumpinas Elementary School
- Don Mariano Marcos Memorial State University (Elementary)
- Felkris Academy (Elementary)
- Gifted Learning Centre (Elementary)
- Ilocanos Elementary School
- Jesus Reigns Christian Academy
- La Finn's Scholastica (Elementary)
- La Union Bible Baptist Academy (Elementary)
- La Union Bright Beginning Learning Center
- La Union Cultural Institute – a private non-sectarian Chinese-Filipino basic education institution offering pre-elementary, elementary, junior, and senior high school programs.
- Lingsat Integrated School (Elementary)
- Mameltac Elementary School
- Masicong Elementary School
- Nagyubuyuban Integrated School (Elementary)
- Pao Elementary School
- Pagudpud Integrated School (Elementary)
- Parparya Elementary School
- Puspus Elementary School
- Sacyud Elementary School
- Sagayad Elementary School
- Saint John Bosco College (Elementary)
- Saint Louis College (Elementary)
- San Agustin (Poro) Elementary School
- San Lorenzo Science School (Elementary)
- San Fernando North Central School
- San Fernando South Central Integrated School (Elementary)
- Santiago Elementary School
- Sevilla Elementary School
- Sibuan-Otong Integrated School (Elementary)
- St. Jude Montessori Educational Center (Elementary)
- St. William Parish Nursery Kindergarten School
- Tanquigan Elementary School
- Union Christian College (Elementary)
- Villa Cherry Montessori
- Vineyard Christian Academy (Elementary)

=== Secondary schools ===
These are the list of private and public high schools.

- Bangbangolan National High School
- BHC Educational Institution
- Christ the King College (High School)
- Don Mariano Marcos Memorial State University (High School)
- Dr. Quintin Balcita Sr. National High School
- Gifted Learning Centre
- La Finn's Scholastica
- La Union Bible Baptist Academy
- La Union Cultural Institute – a private non-sectarian Chinese-Filipino basic education institution offering pre-elementary, elementary, junior, and senior high school programs.
- La Union National High School - Sacyud Annex
- La Union National High School
- Lingsat Integrated School
- Nagyubuyuban Integrated School
- Pagudpud Integrated School
- Pao National High School
- Saint John Bosco College (High School)
- Saint Louis College (High School)
- San Fernando City National Vocational High School
- San Fernando City SPED High School
- San Fernando South Central Integrated School
- San Lorenzo Science School
- Sibuan-Otong Integrated School
- St. Jude Montessori Educational Center
- Union Christian College (High School)
- Vineyard Christian Academy

=== Higher educational institutions ===
These are the list of Higher Educational Institutions (HEIs) situated in the city.

- AMA Computer College
- CICOSAT Colleges
- Don Mariano Marcos Memorial State University
- Northern Philippines College of Maritime, Science and Technology
- Saint John Bosco College
- Saint Louis College
- Union Christian College
- Lorma College

== Economy ==
Poverty incidence of San Fernando (%)

Source: Philippine Statistics Authority

The city's economy is driven by three primary sectors: agriculture, industry, and services, with the service sector playing a dominant role. The city of San Fernando is classified as a third-income class city, with a poverty incidence of 5.09% as of 2020. In 2022, the city's revenue increased by 22.11%, reaching PHP 1.195 billion. Its total assets also grew by 20.67%, amounting to PHP 2.661 billion. Equity rose by 15.89% to PHP 2.241 billion, while expenditures decreased by 7.00% to PHP 891.10 million. Meanwhile, the city's liabilities increased to PHP 420.28 million.

In 2024 the City Government of San Fernando, La Union ranked 9th Overall Most Competitive Local Government Unit under the Component Cities Category in the Cities and Municipalities Competitive Index (CMCI) 2024 of the Department of Trade and Industry (DTI).

=== Agriculture ===
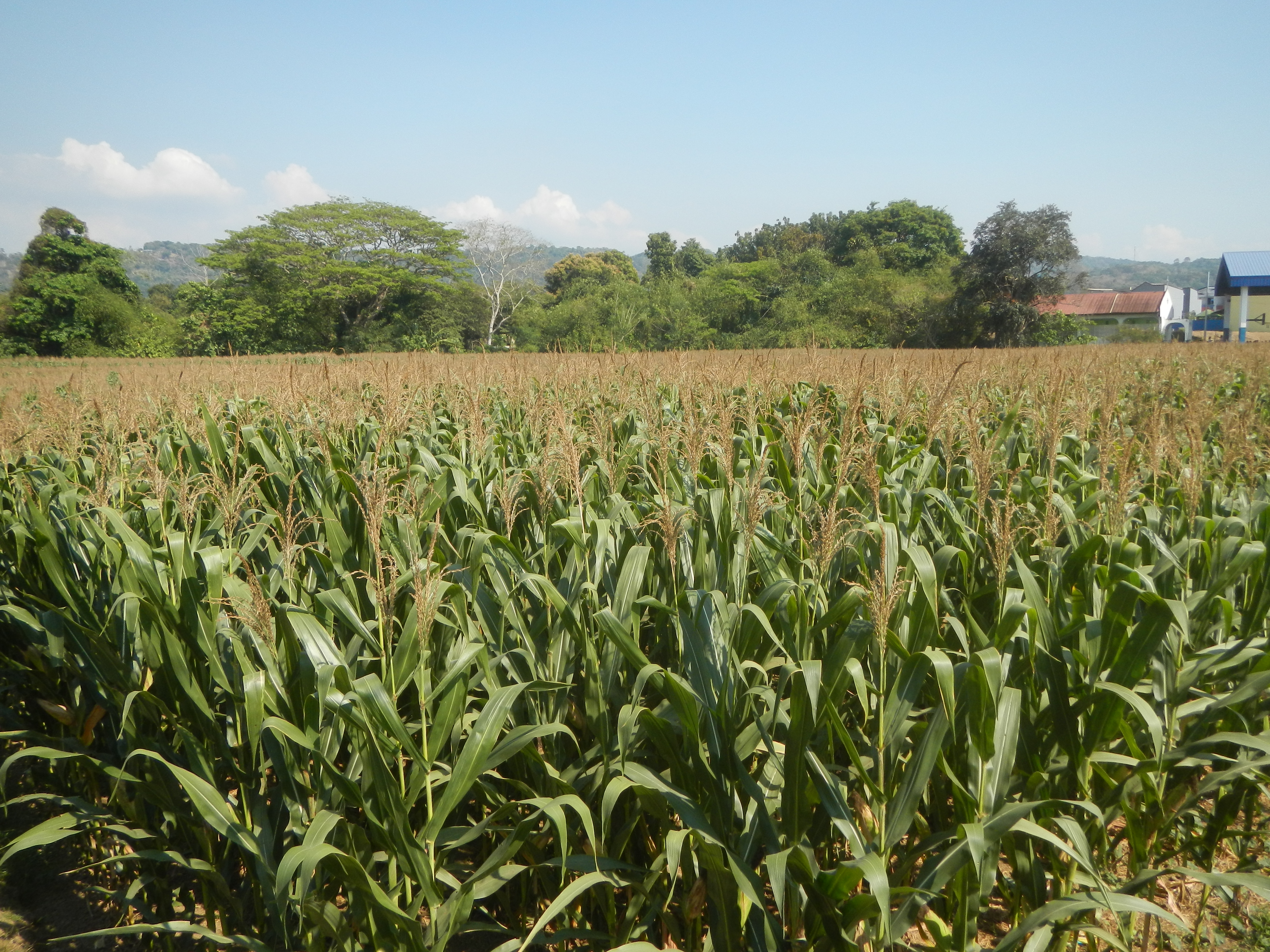
Cornfield in Langcuas supports agricultural growth

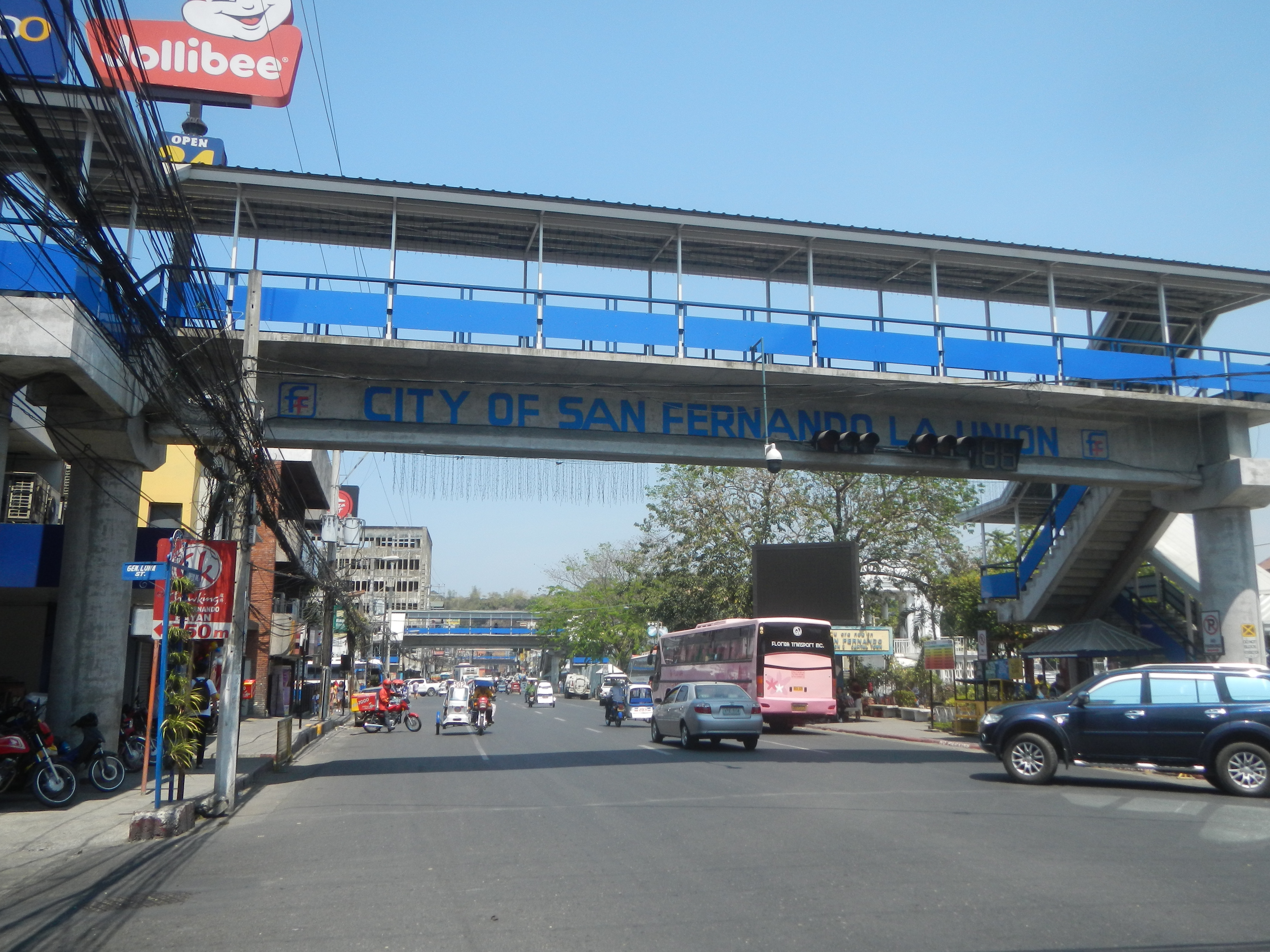
City Proper serves as a commercial and trade hub

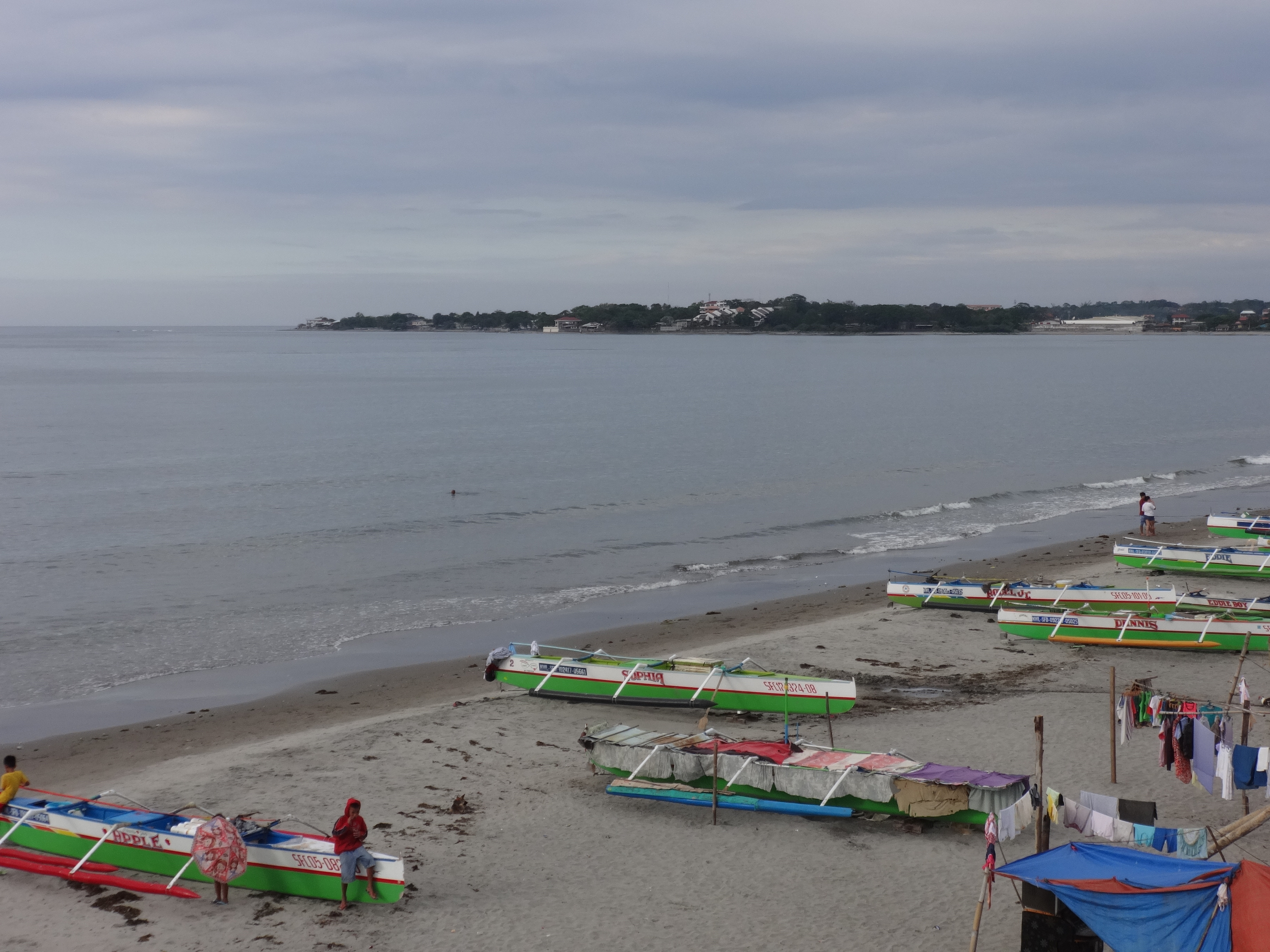
Fishing site in Ilocanos Sur boosts local economy

The city maintains a primarily agricultural economy, with key crops including rice, legumes, leafy vegetables, root crops, fruit trees, corn, and tobacco. Fishing along the coastline provides an additional source of income for many residents, while aquaculture is also practiced in barangays near the Carlatan Lagoon, as well as in Catbangen and Madayegdeg.

The agricultural output of San Fernando illustrates diverse levels of food sufficiency, with rice at 31.91%, corn at 47%, root crops at 87.73%, legumes at 106.75%, fruits at 60.49%, and vegetables at 127.55%. Livestock production is also significant, yielding reported quantities of 3,584 kg of hogs, 2,266 kg of cattle, 1,545 kg of carabaos, 2,060 kg of goats, and a notable 21,644 chickens.

=== Industry ===
The city economy is also driven by agro-industries, cottage industries, and manufacturing sectors. San Fernando's economy is supported by agro-industries, cottage industries, and the manufacturing sector. The city's One Town, One Product (OTOP) initiative highlights the soft broom and bamboo craft industries, particularly in the highland barangays, where tiger grass is abundantly grown. Additionally, the production of daing (dried fish) and bugguong (fermented fish sauce) is prevalent in the coastal barangays, contributing to the local economy.

The city also has a significant manufacturing sector, particularly in food processing, timber, and other related industries. Major industrial establishments include the Coca-Cola Plant, Poro Point Industrial Corporation, Steel Corporation, and petroleum depots operated by Petron, Caltex, and Shell. These industries play a vital role in the city's economic growth and integration into regional and national trade networks.

=== Service ===
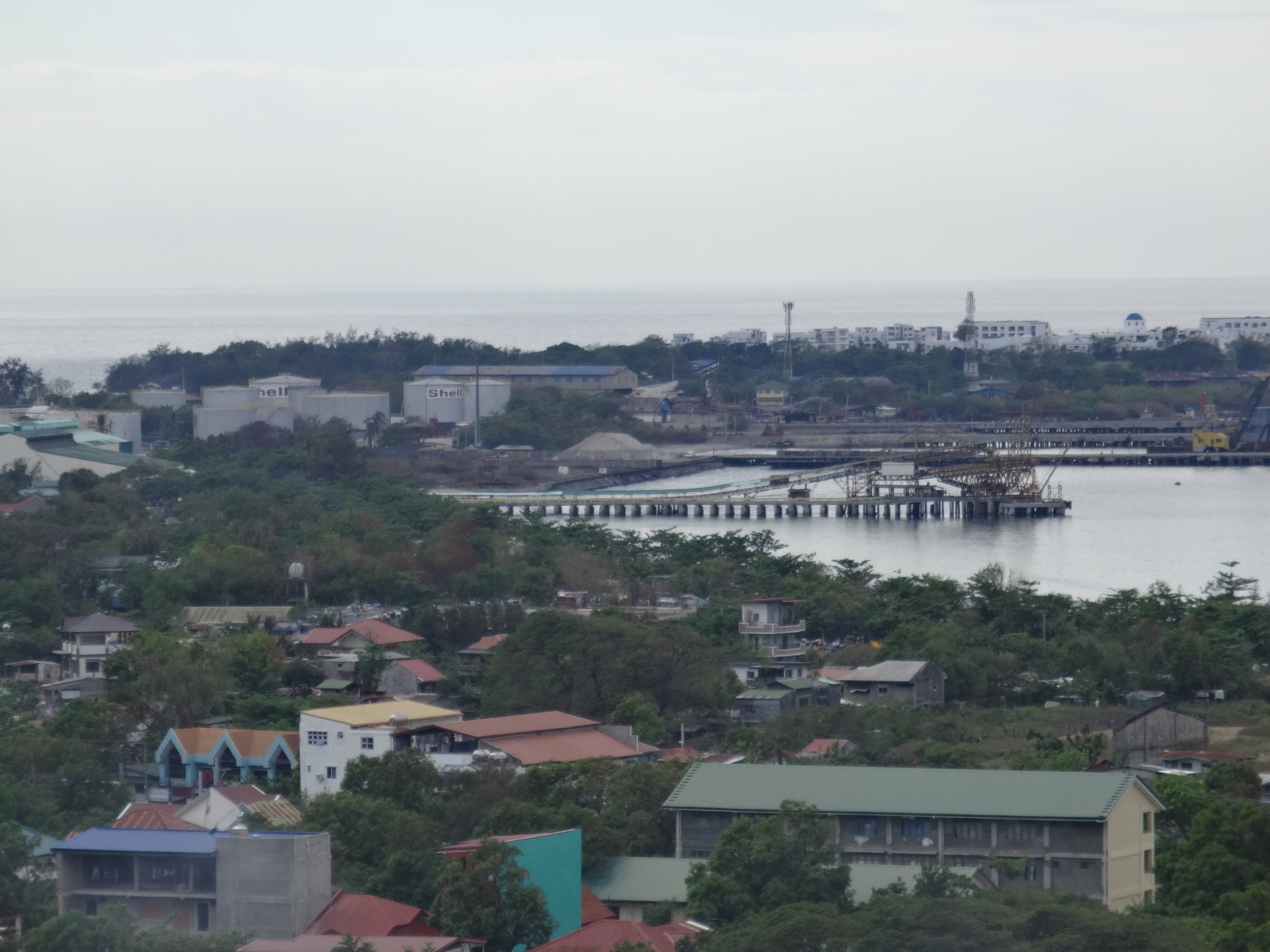
Poro Point Freeport Zone in the City of San Fernando, La Union

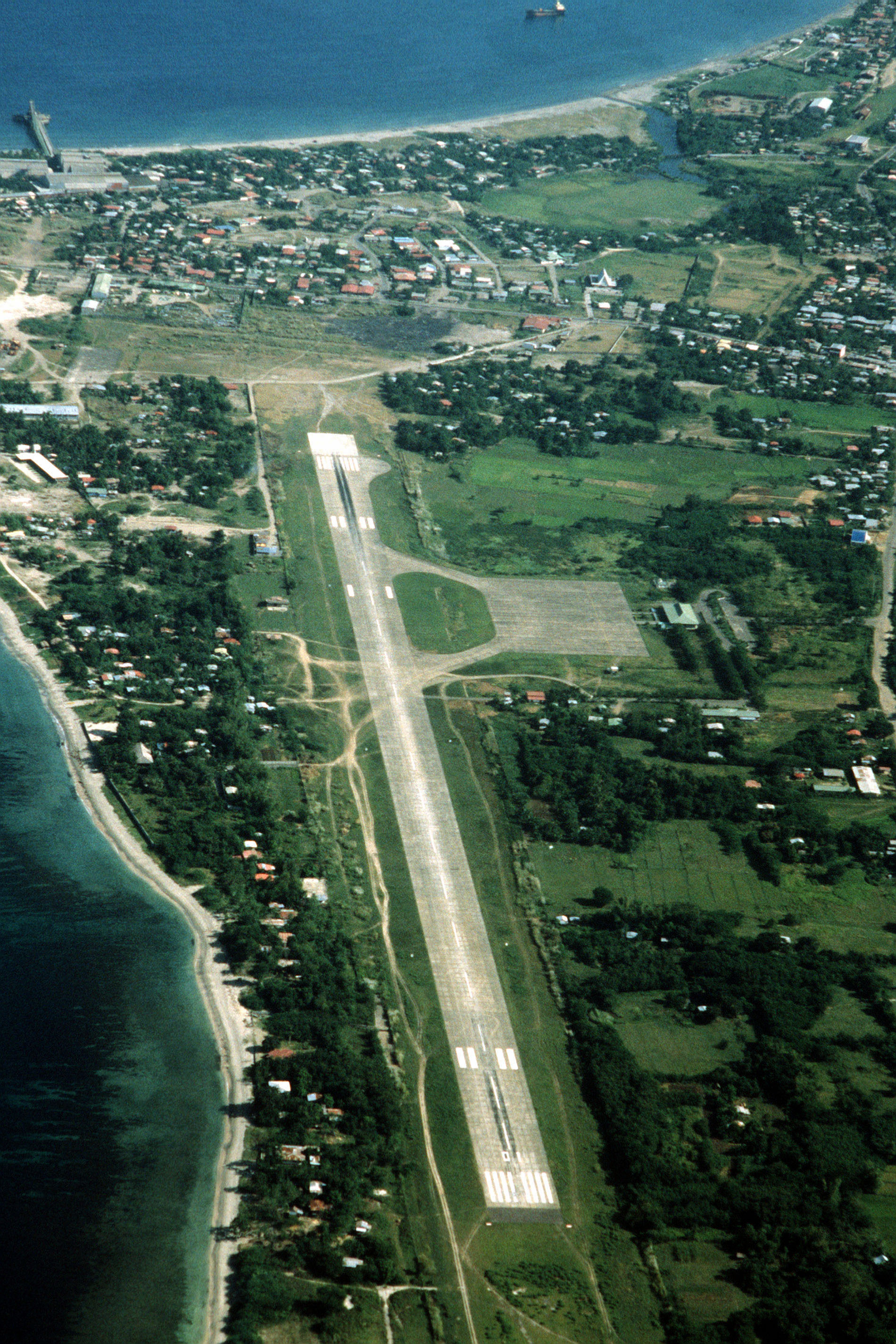
San Fernando Domectic Airport

Regarding economic activity, San Fernando City is home to 9,129 registered businesses. The financial sector is bolstered by 47 banking institutions, which encompass universal, commercial, thrift, rural, and microfinance banks, as documented by the Bangko Sentral ng Pilipinas (BSP) in 2018. The financial statements of the city government for the same year reflect a revenue of Php. 778,822,666.43 and expenditures amounting to Php. 608,973,969.57.

The infrastructure in the city is well-developed, featuring a road network that extends 237.42 km, along with one domestic airport San Fernando Airport and one international seaport. All barangays in the city have access to electricity, and a single water district provides essential services to the community. Telecommunications are facilitated by four mobile service providers.

The city will be connected by an extension of the Tarlac–Pangasinan–La Union Expressway. Plans for the expressway leading to La Union were originally proposed as the extension of the North Luzon Expressway in the 1990s.

In the sectors of health and education, San Fernando has established a comprehensive network of 292 health facilities, which includes one public hospital and four private hospitals includes; Ilocos Training and Regional Medical Center, Lorma Medical Center, La Union Medical Diagnostic Center and Hospital, Inc. and Bethany Hospital, in addition to 79 public clinics and 203 private clinics.

The city prioritizes education, hosting a total of 11 universities and colleges such as the Don Mariano Marcos Memorial State University, along with various public and private educational institutions at different levels: 16 secondary schools, 18 elementary schools, 26 preschools, and 64 public day care centers. These facilities exemplify the city's commitment to improving the quality of life for its residents through accessible health and education services.

== Government ==
=== Local Government ===
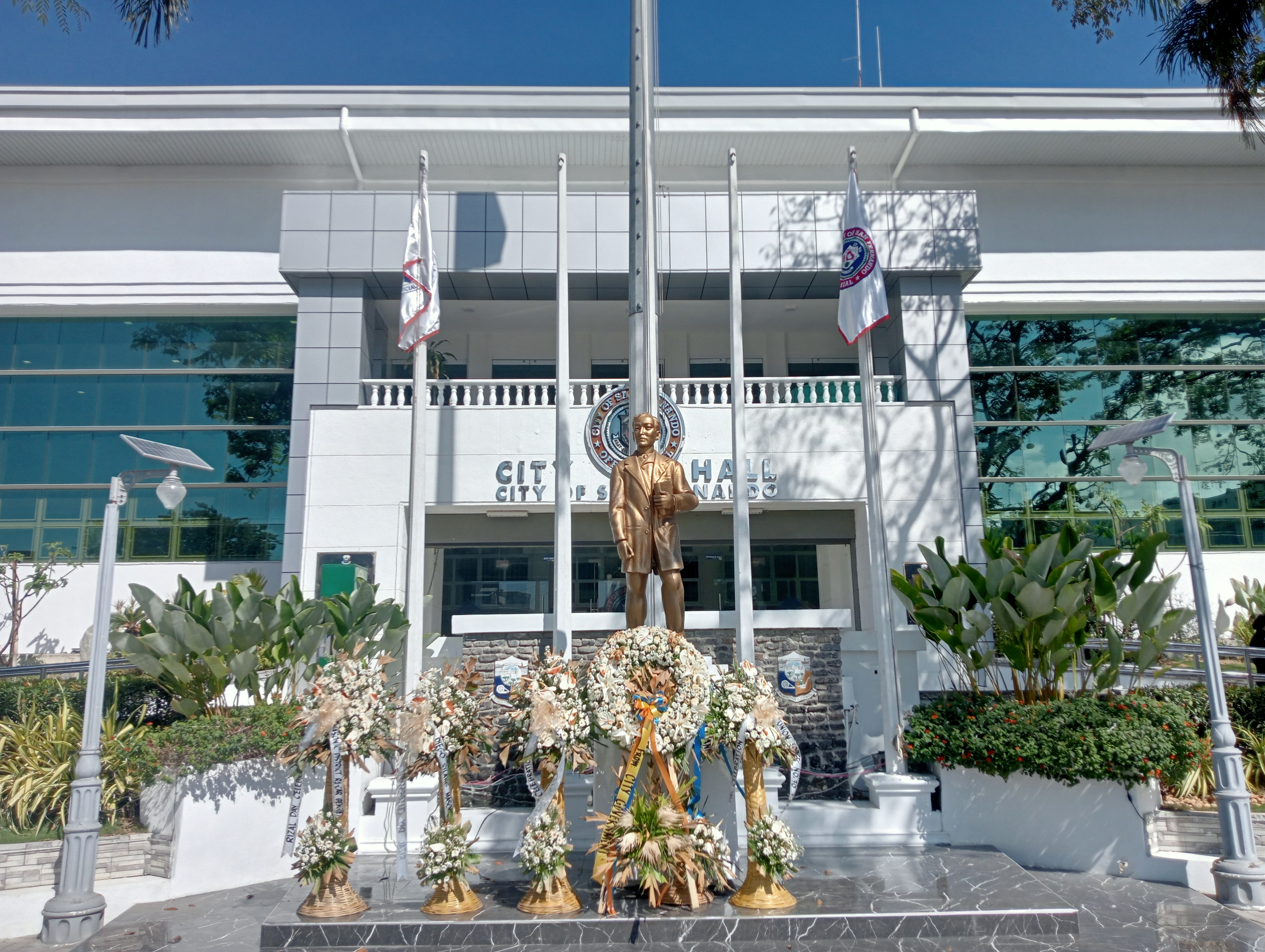

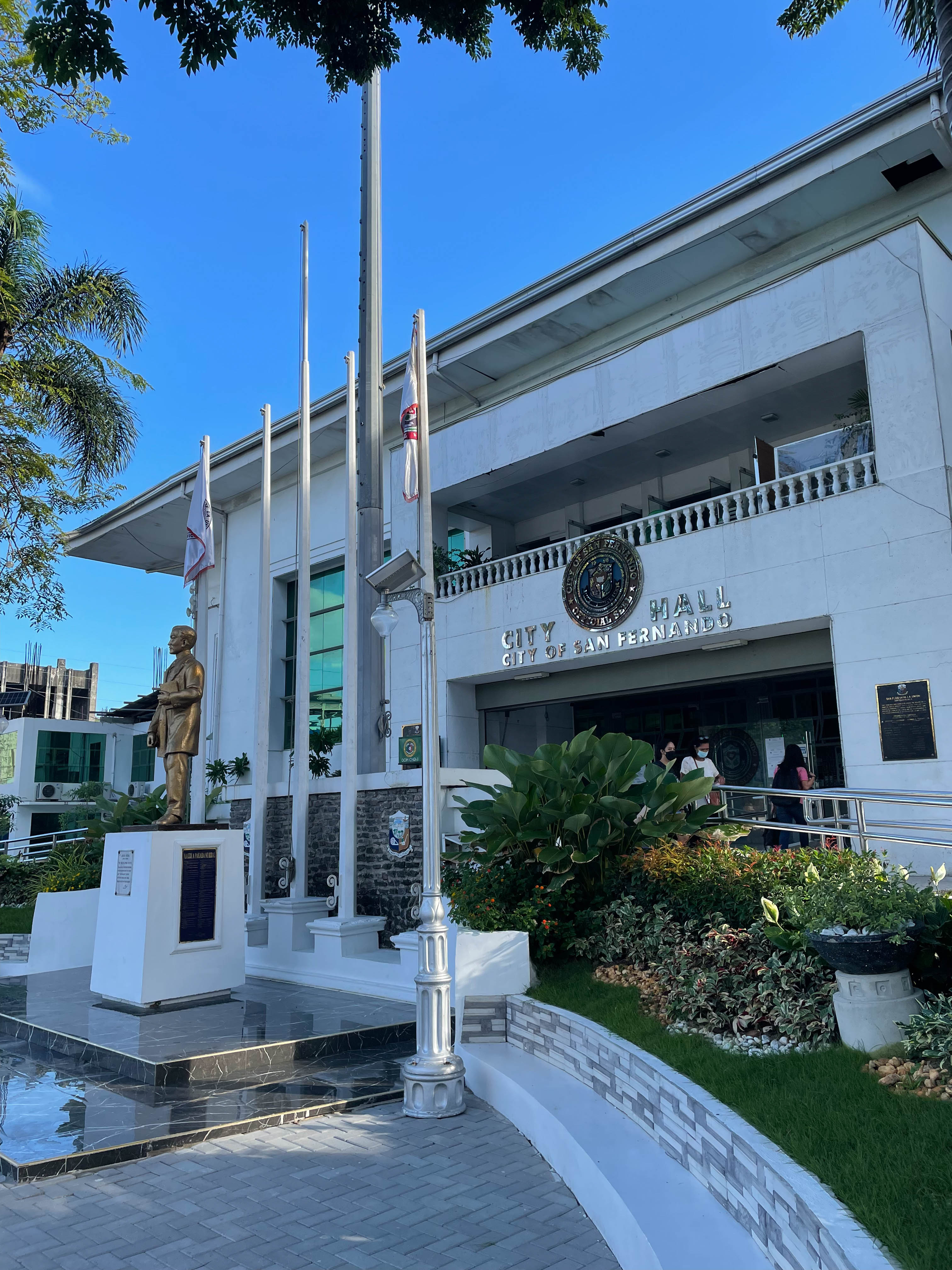
City Hall, The government building for administrative and public services.

San Fernando, part of the first congressional district of the province of La Union, is governed by a mayor who serves as the local chief executive, alongside a city council composed of 12 councilors. The city council, known as the Sangguniang Panlungsod, reviews and enacts ordinances and resolutions. It operates in accordance with the Local Government Code, which also provides for regular and ex-officio members. The mayor, vice mayor, and councilors are directly elected by the residents through an at-large voting system held every three years with supervision of Commission on Election.

The mayor and other city officials hold office at the San Fernando City Hall, while the Sangguniang Panlungsod convenes in the Don Mariano Marcos Building, located adjacent to the city hall.

Each 59 barangay, the smallest political unit of the city, is governed by a set of elected officials, including a Punong Barangay (Barangay Captain) and a Sangguniang Barangay (Barangay Councils) composed of councilors. Additionally, the youth are represented by the Sangguniang Kabataan, which elected by voters aged 15 to 30 years old, is the ex officio eighth member is led by a chairman and its own council. Like other local officials, barangay and Sangguniang Kabataan officials are elected every three years.

=== Elected officials ===
Members of the San Fernando City Council (2022-2025)
Position	Name
District Representative (1st Legislative District of the Province of La Union)	Francisco Paolo P. Ortega V
Chief Executive of the City of San Fernando	Mayor Hermenegildo A. Gualberto
Presiding Officer of the City Council of San Fernando	Vice Mayor Alfred Pablo R. Ortega
Members of the City Council	Kyle Marie Eufrosito Y. Nisce
Members of the City Council	Pablo C. Ortega
Members of the City Council	Lucia Esperanza O. Valero
Members of the City Council	Jonathan Justo A. Orros
Members of the City Council	Edwin H. Yumul
Members of the City Council	Janwell E. Pacio
Members of the City Council	Rodolfo M. Abat
Members of the City Council	Arnel A. Almazan
Members of the City Council	Aldrine R. Jucar
Members of the City Council	John H. Orros
Members of the City Council	Mark Anthony A. Ducusin
Members of the City Council	Quintin L. Balcita Jr.

=== List of chief executives ===
- 1895–1898 — Paulino Alviar
- 1899–1901 — Blas Tadiar
- 1901–1903 — Urbano Martínez
- 1904–1905 — Edilberto Aquino
- 1906–1907 — Francisco Z. Flores
- 1908–1909 — Angel Salanga
- 1910–1911 — José Hidalgo
- 1912–1914 — Anastacio Casuga
- 1915–1918 — Juan Salanga
- 1919–1921 — Ulpiano Flores
- 1922–1928 — Pedro R. Flores
- 1928 — Francisco Galvez
- 1928–1930 — Evaristo Galvez
- 1931–1933 — Gaspar Flores
- 1934–1936 — Lauro Casuga
- 1936–1939 — Paulino Flores
- 1942–1944 — Juan Salanga
- 1945–1946 — Modesto Aquino
- 1946–1955 — Lorenzo L. Dacanay
- 1956–1959 — Godofredo G. Rilloraza
- 1960–1971 — Lorenzo L. Dacanay
- 1972–1980 — Antonio Feraren
- 1980 — Joaquin T. Ortega
- 1980–1987 — Justo O. Orros Jr.
- 1987 — Rufo T. Colisao
- 1987–1988 — Angel Salanga
- 1988–1998 — Manuel C. Ortega
- 1998–2007 — Mary Jane C. Ortega
- 2007–2016 — Pablo C. Ortega
- 2016–Present — Hermenegildo A. Gualberto

== Annual Community Events ==
The City of San Fernando, like many other regions in the Philippines, celebrates its festivities with great enthusiasm. The city's annual fiesta takes place from January 28 to February 15, featuring a trade fair near the city hall. Additional celebrations occur in March to commemorate its cityhood.

- Pindangan Festival: Held annually during the cityhood anniversary, this festival features a street dance competition showcasing three significant socio-historical elements of the city's identity: the Pindangan Ruins, the merging of two historical settlements that formed the town, and the traditional fish preservation technique known as "pindang." Participants are categorized into groups from primary, secondary, and tertiary schools, as well as contingents from barangays and districts.
- Commemoration of Bacsil Ridge: This event honors the heroism displayed during the recapture of Bacsil during World War II. On March 19, 1945, the 121st Infantry of USAFIP defeated Japanese forces, leading to the liberation of Bacsil Ridge. Three days later, the town of San Fernando was freed.
- Ma-tzu Festival: A unique religious celebration blending Chinese and Roman Catholic traditions, this festival honors Ma-tzu, the Chinese goddess of the sea, and the Virgin of Caysasay, who is revered by the Filipino-Chinese community as the reincarnation of Ma-tzu. Ma-tzu is believed to provide protection and guidance to fishermen and sailors.
- Rabii ti Pammadyaw: This event recognizes outstanding individuals who have brought honor to the city through excellence in their respective fields.
- Grand People's Parade: Also known as the Parade of Lights, this parade takes place along the city's major thoroughfares. Participants include drum and lyre groups, beauty pageant contestants, and others. Awards are given for the best float, costume, and choreography.
- Fiesta ti Baybay: A sea craft competition paired with traditional games like "palosebo" and "Laro ng Lahi." In 2023, this event was held in Barangay Ilocanos Sur.

== Tourism ==
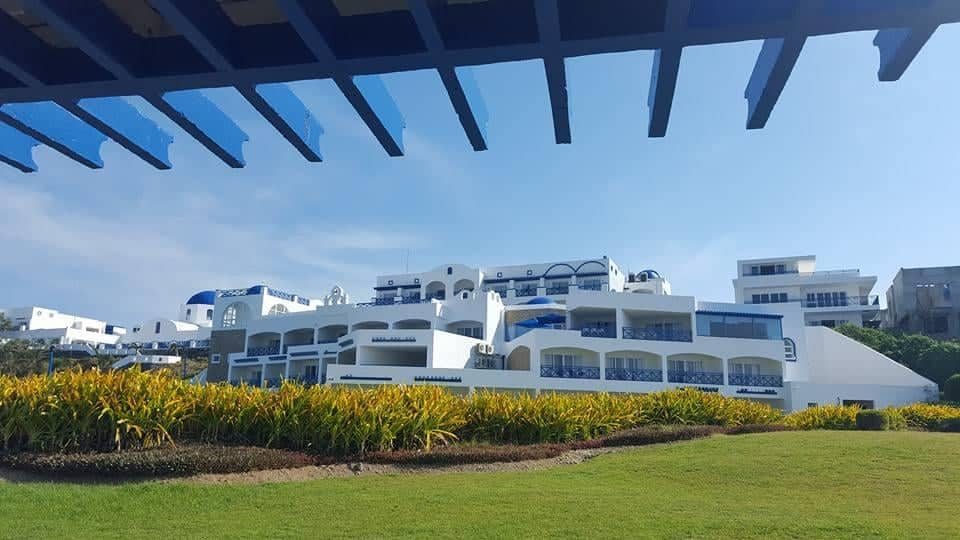
Thunderbird Resorts and Casinos Poro Point

Ma-Cho Temple (Taoist Temple)

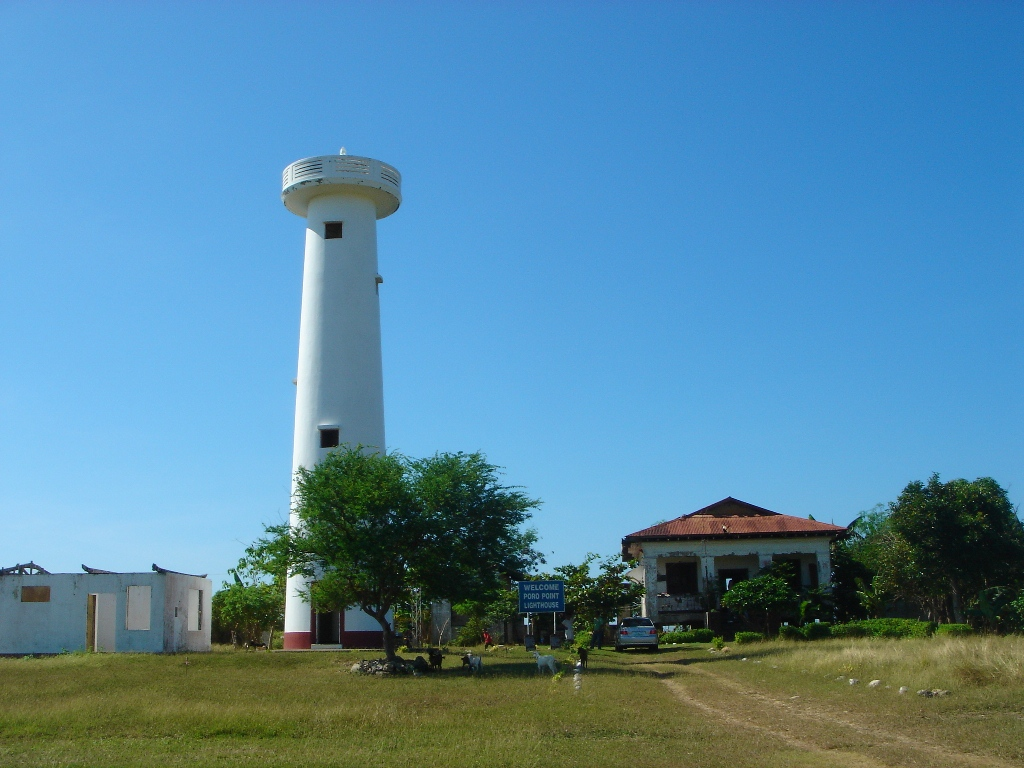
Poro Point Lighthouse

Pagoda Temple

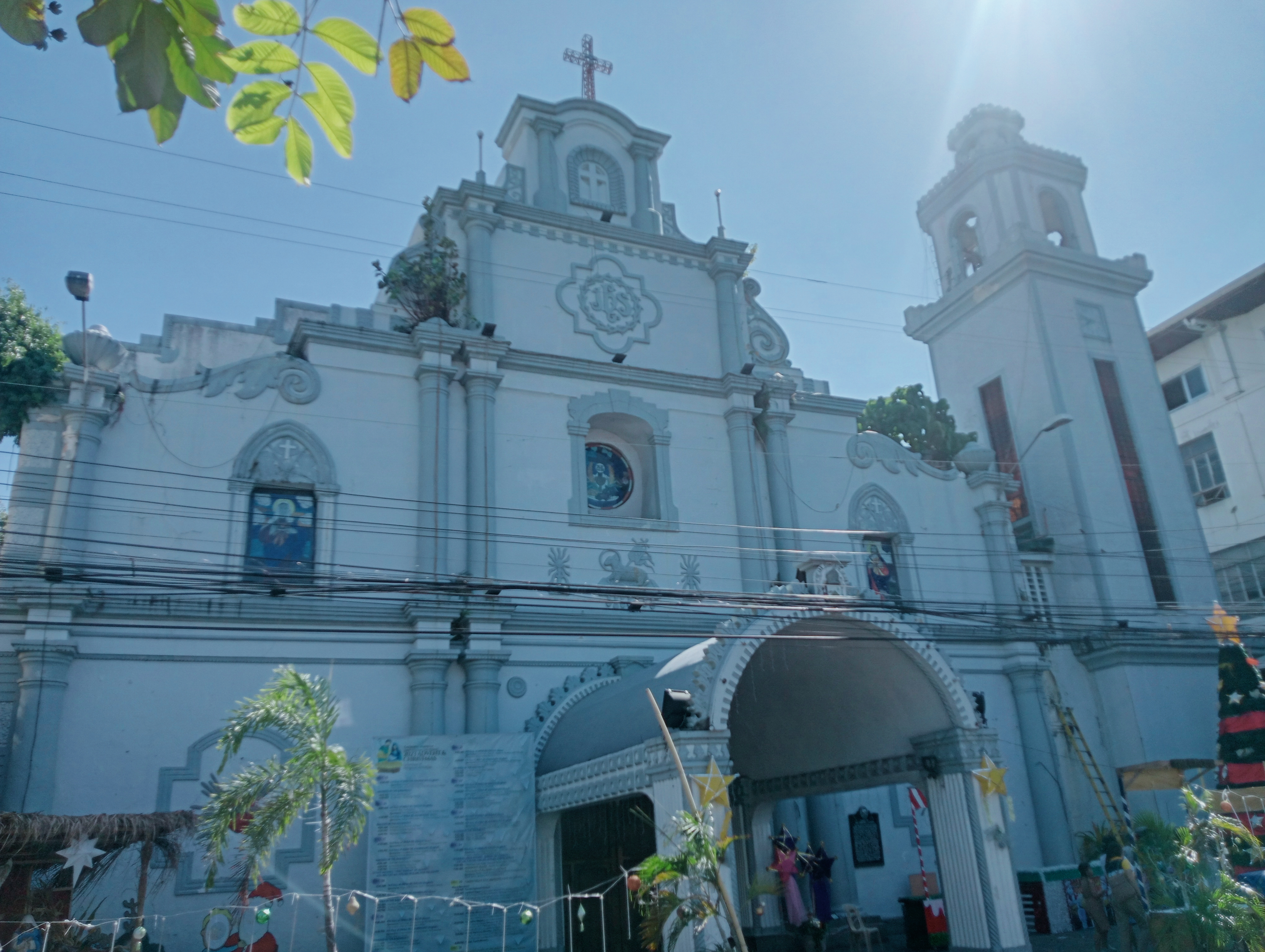
Cathedral Parish of Saint William the Hermit Church

The city of San Fernando has several attractions, including beaches, waterfalls, historical sites, churches and temples, leisure parks, shopping malls, hotels, and restaurants.

- Poro Point
  - Poro Point Special Economic and Freeport Zone (formerly American Military Base – Wallace Air Station)
  - Thunderbird Resorts
  - Boardwalk
- The La Union Botanical Garden (8 kilometers from the city) – is a 10 hectare garden (Barangay Cadaclan), the home of various species of rare plants and a sanctuary of wild animals.
- Battle of Bacsil Ridge Marker
- Pindangan Ruins (Barangay Parian)
- Hobbitat Forest Park
- Poro Point Baywalk (Barangay Poro)
- Seven Hills
  - Capitol Hill (Barangay II) home of the Provincial Capitol
  - Pagoda Hill also known as Filipino-Chinese Friendship Park or Chinese Pagoda (Barangay II)
  - Heroes’ Hill & Freedom Park Stairway (153 steps) located at the eastern portion of Capitol Hill
  - Bethany Hill (Barangay II)
  - Mirador Hill (Barangay II)
  - Mariner's Hill (Barangay Catbangen)
  - Miracle Hill (Barangay Pagdaraoan)
- Christ the Redeemer (25-foot statue, Reservoir Hill, Barangay I)
- Poro Point Lighthouse
- Moro Watch Tower (Barangay Carlatan)
- La Union Science Centrum & Museum (LUSCM has 5 Galleries: Kadaklan Burial Site and Environmental Gallery, Museum, Dark Room, Main Science Gallery and Portable Planetarium (Barangay Cadaclan)
- Ma-Cho Temple
- Tomb of Unknown Soldier (Barangay Madayegdeg)
- Cathedral of St. William the Hermit (Barangay II, Poblacion)
- Kasay Marine Sanctuary: 30 hectares MPA, featuring the 50 years old Giant clam or Tridacna gigas (Barangay Canaoay)
- Children's Park (Barangay II, City Plaza)
- 10.6 hectares Engineered Sanitary Landfill (Barangay Mameltac)
- La Union Trade Center (beside the City Hall)

== Notable personalities ==
- Armando Palabay, human rights activist and martyr honored at the Bantayog ng mga Bayani
- Ashley Ortega, actress
- Roger Casugay, Filipino surfer
- Clare R. Baltazar, National Scientist of the Philippines for Systematic Entomology
- Lucrecia Kasilag, composer, Dean of the Philippine Women's University College of Music and Fine Arts (1953–1977), president of the Cultural Center of the Philippines (1976–1986), awardee of the Order of National Artists of the Philippines
- Alejo Mabanag, Filipino senator from 1953 to 1959 and 30th Secretary of Justice of the Philippines from 1959 to 1961
- Lorraine Galvez, singer
- Bobby Ortega (1939–2017), Filipino police officer and Baguio City policeman
- Jessica Soho, journalist, narrator and magazine TV host

== Sister cities ==
- Ansan, South Korea
- Coatzacoalcos, Mexico
- (Philippines) Naga, Camarines Sur
- (Philippines) Valenzuela City

== Gallery ==
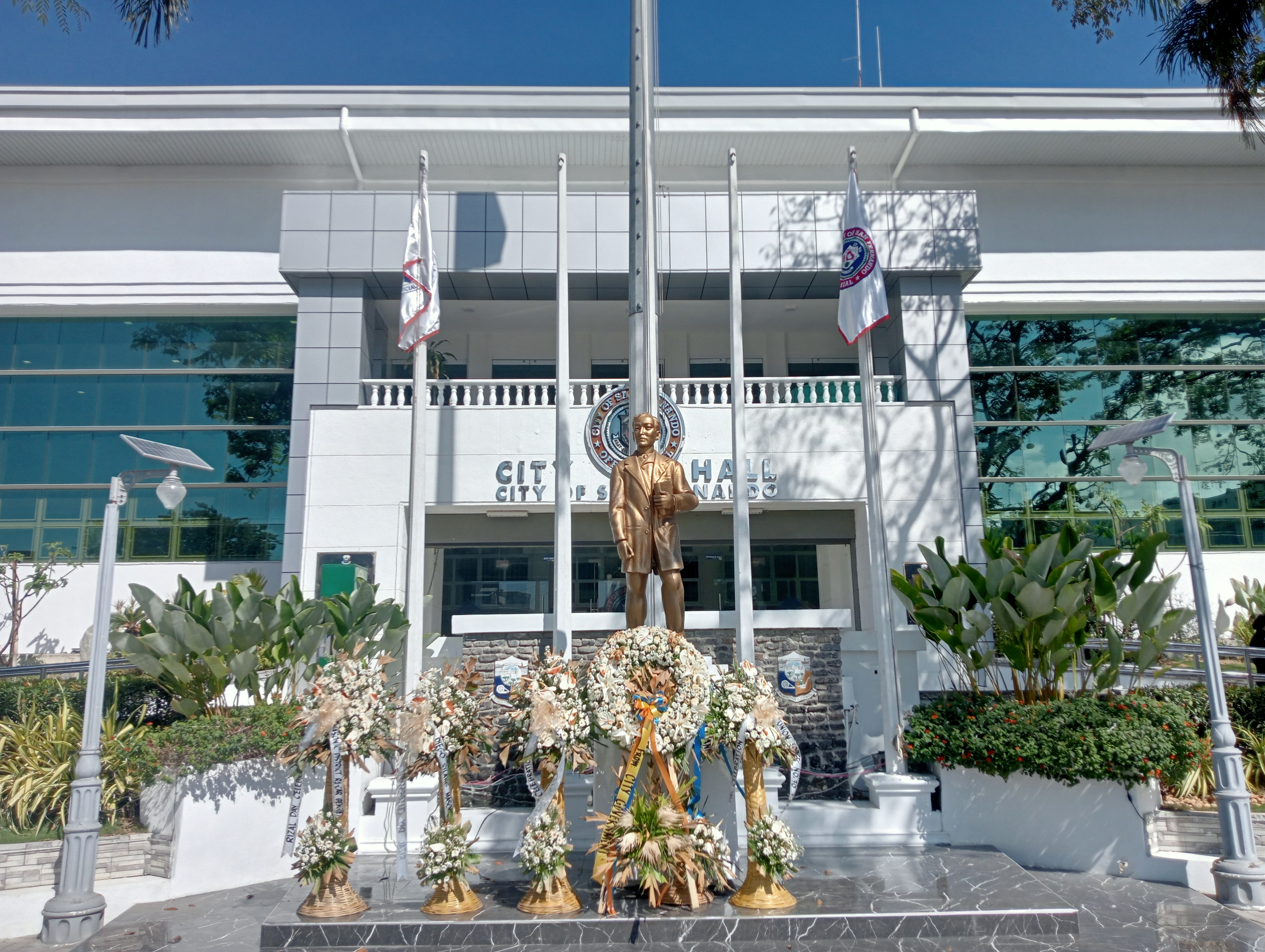
City Hall along Francisco Ortega Highway

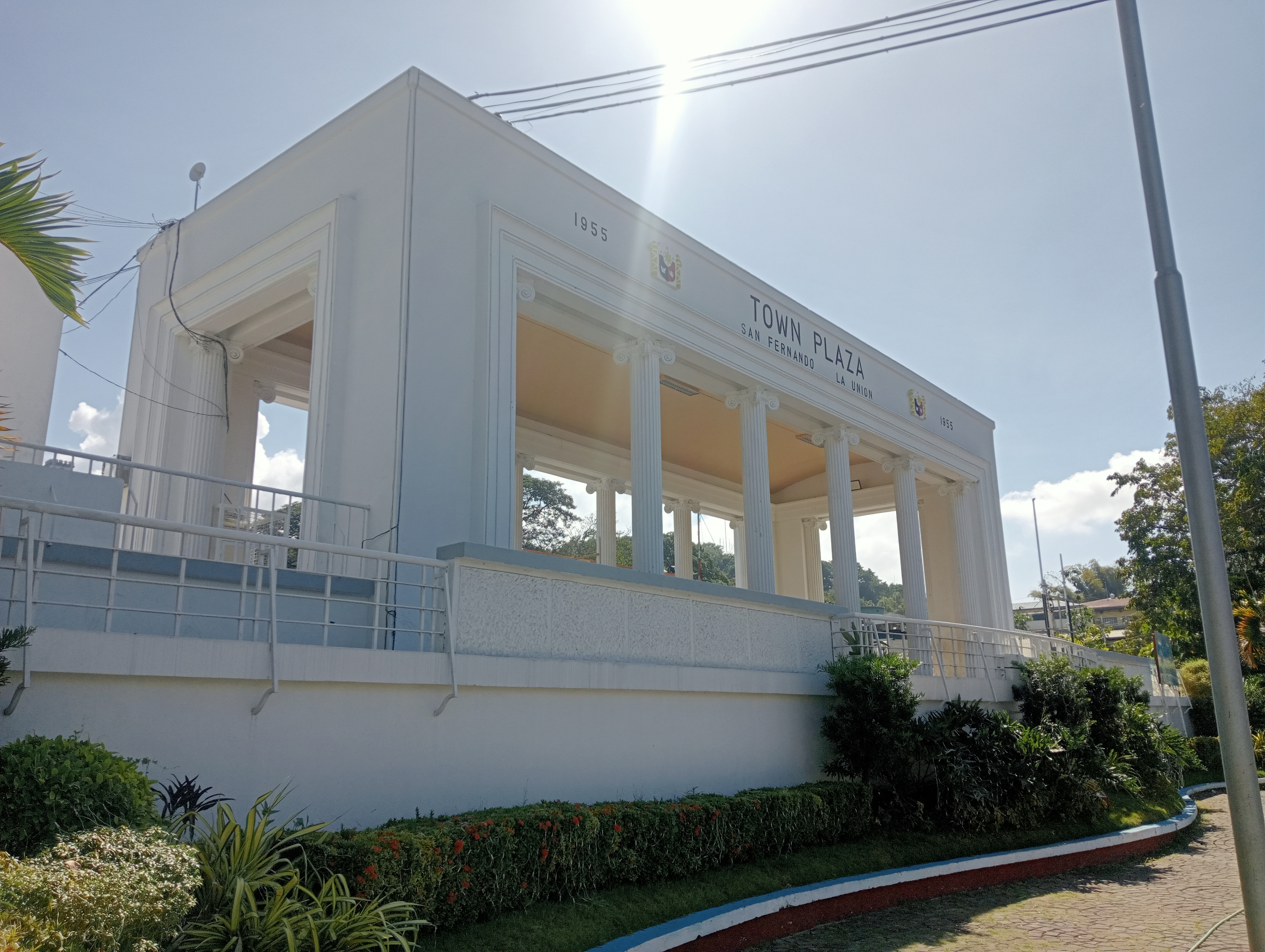
Town Plaza along Quezon Avenue

Pagoda Temple along Aguila Road

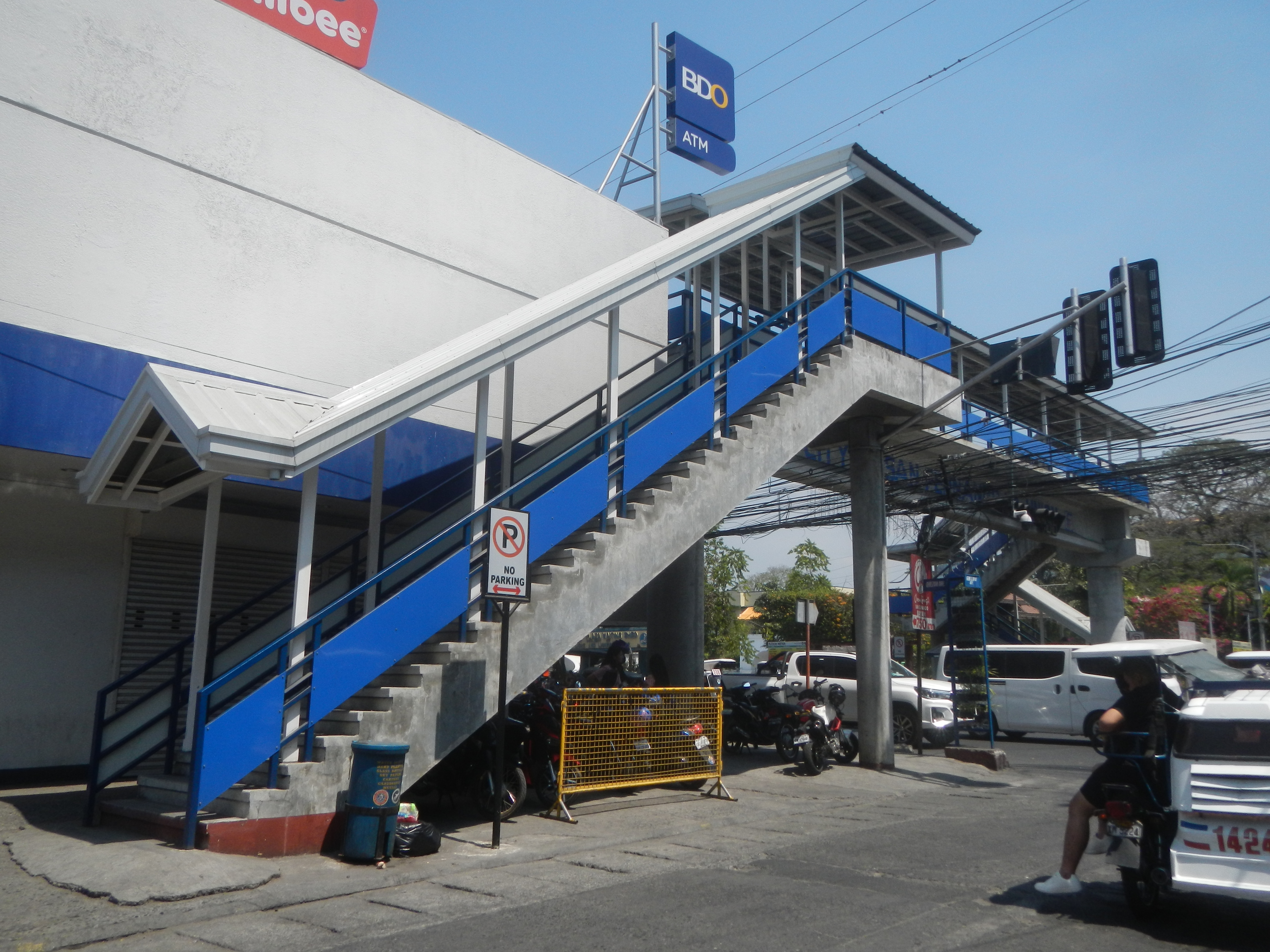
City Footbridge along Gen. Luna Street

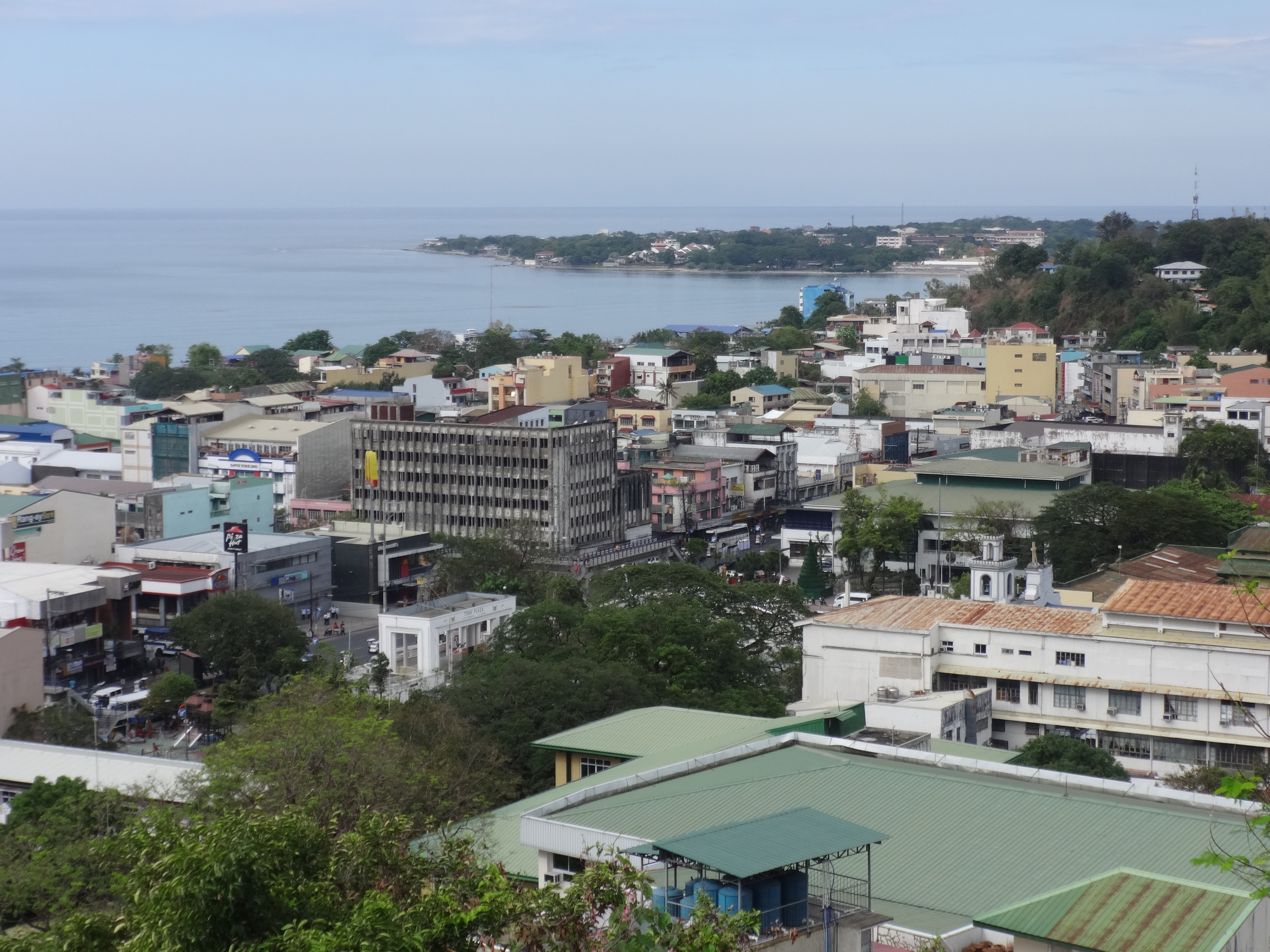
The City Skyline

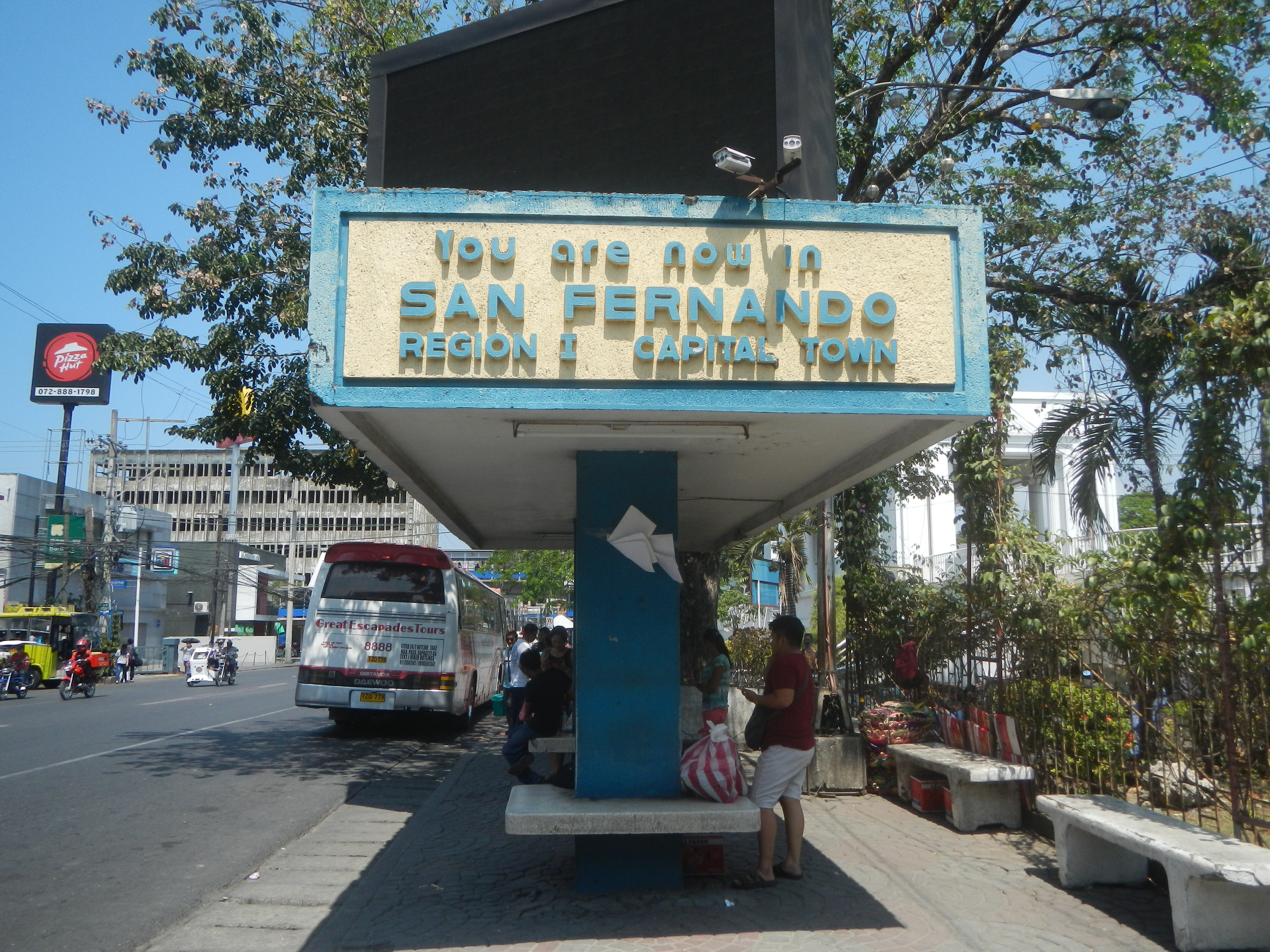
City Town Plaza

Ma-Cho Temple tower

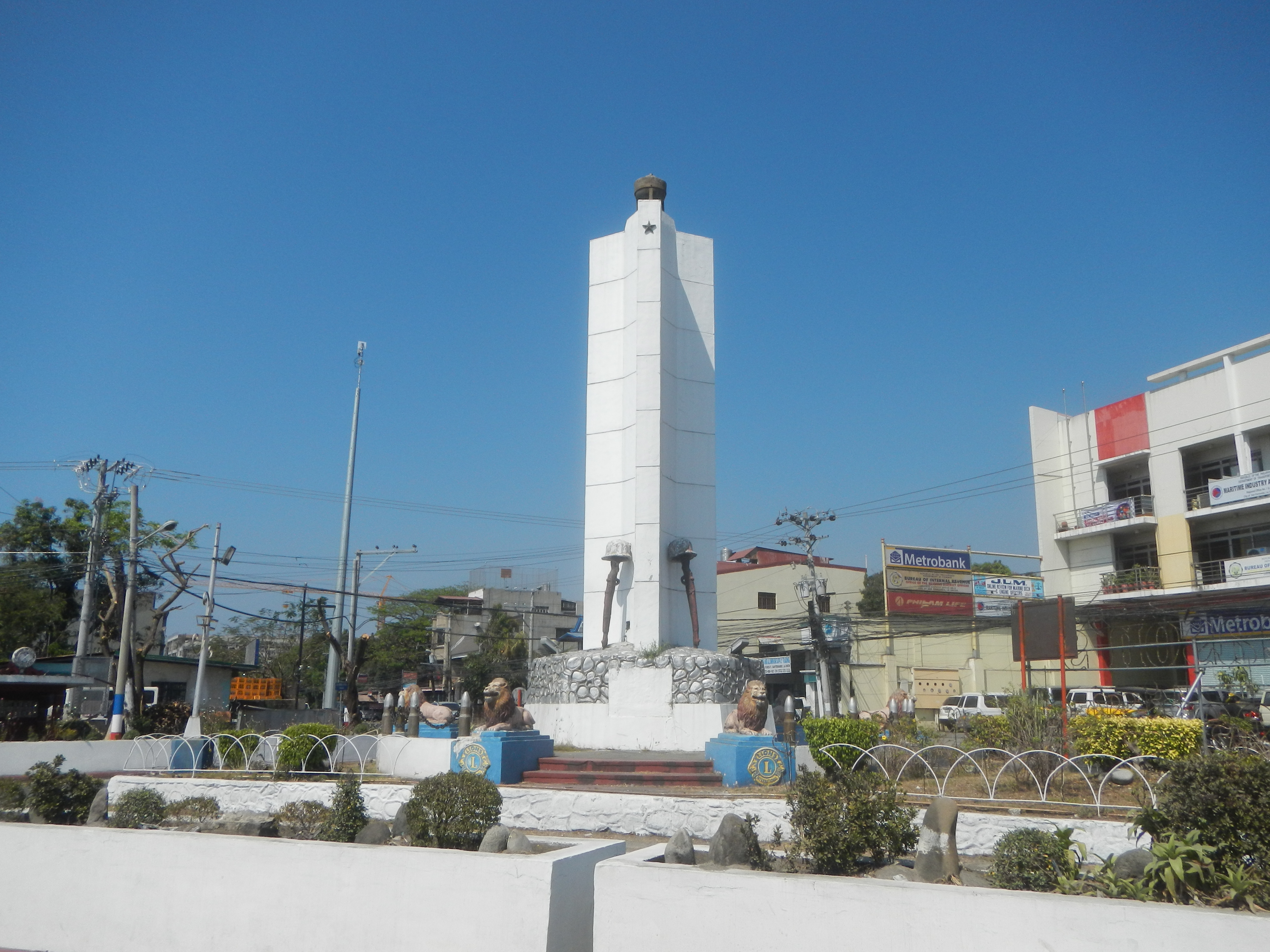
Tomb of the Unknown Soldiers

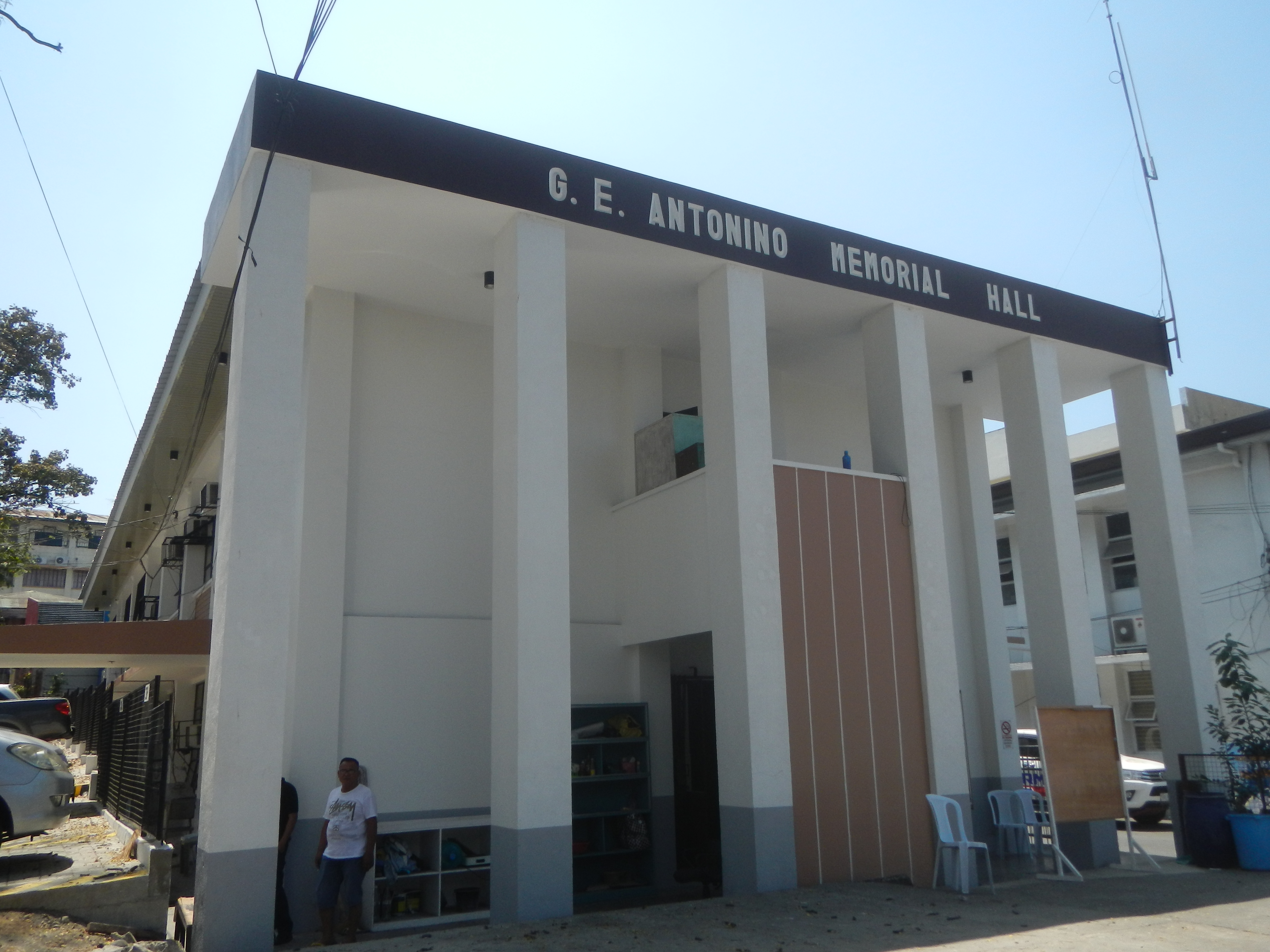
G.E. Antonio Memorial Hall along Gen. Luna Street
