= Thunderbird Resorts (Philippines) =

Hotel in Philippines

Coordinates: 16.609041°N 120.286367°E

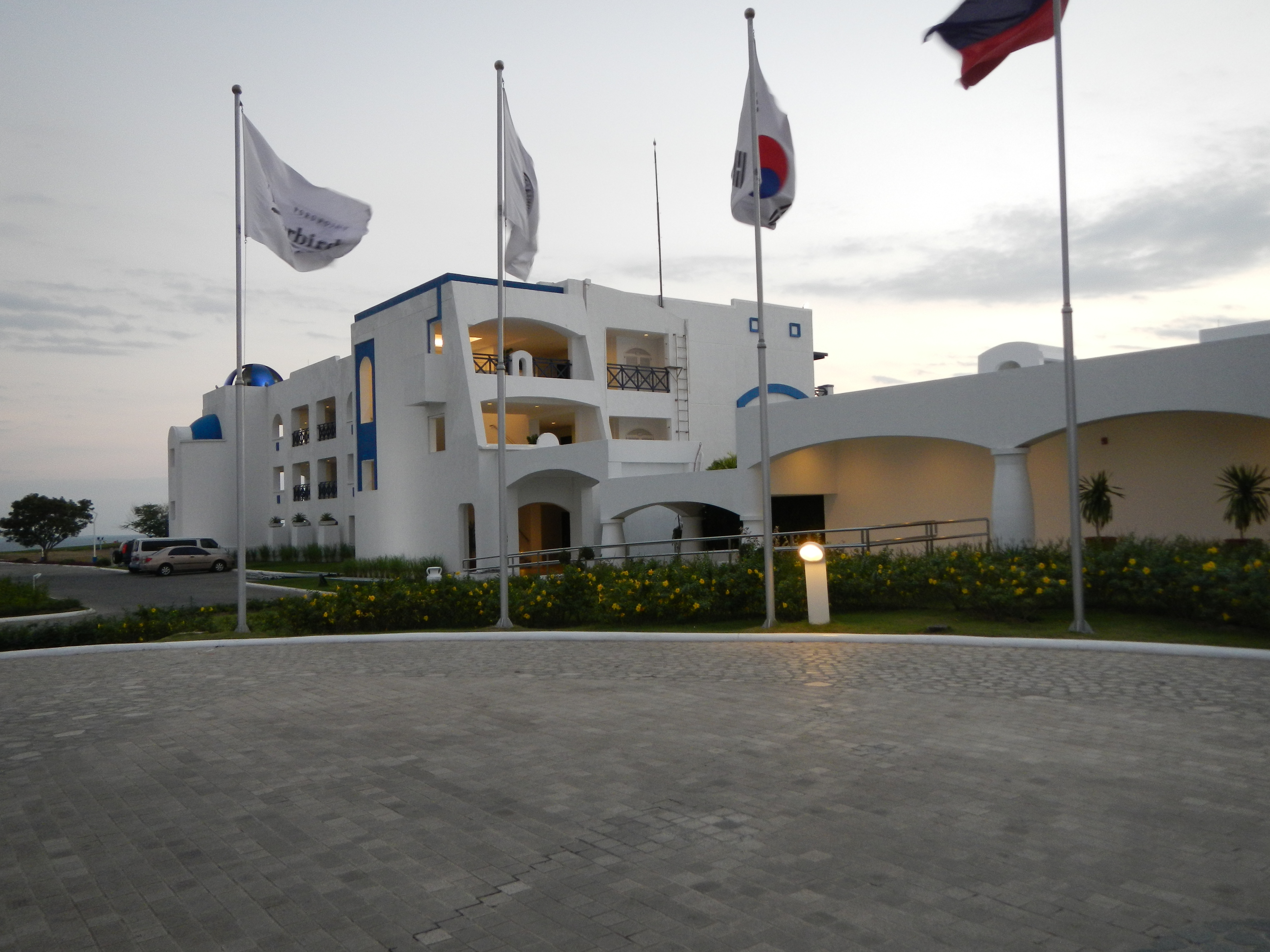
Thunderbirds Resort-Hotel, Poro Point, San Fernando, La Union

Thunderbird Resorts (Philippines), or Thunderbirds Resort-Hotel, is a five-star integrated resort facing the West Philippine Sea in Northern Luzon, Philippines. It is owned by an international property developer, anchored by a casino, and provides hospitality services in Asia and Latin America. It has other branches in Costa Rica, India, Nicaragua, and Peru. It is located at VOA, Pennsylvania Avenue, Poro Point Special Economic and Freeport Zone, San Fernando, La Union, facing the lighthouse besides Naval Station Ernesto Ogbinar (formerly Wallace Air Station).

The resort is headed by an independent board of directors led by director Roberto de Ocampo. The resort is managed by Peter LeSar, the interim president and CEO and chief financial officer.

The resort is surrounded by the Thunderbird Residences, which were inaugurated in October 2010. A model unit, Athena is one of the 10 beach homes or villas (under a rental contract) facing the main lobby of the hotel. Chloe, Selene, Alexa, and Aphrodite homes are also in the resort, which has 80 lots (within 15 hectares).

The resort overlooks the edge of a headland into the South China Sea.

The amenities include: Deluxe Garden Room, Deluxe Balcony Room, and Deluxe VO Room; Olives Restaurant; Patio Santorini Coffee Shop; Vegas Cafe; Pool Bar; Santorini Bar & Lounge; Swimming Pool; and Cliffs Golf & Beach Club. The luxury suites are nestled upon a 100-foot cliff at the highest point of the Poro peninsula. A ₱200 million condotel will be erected on the prime property.

== Image gallery ==
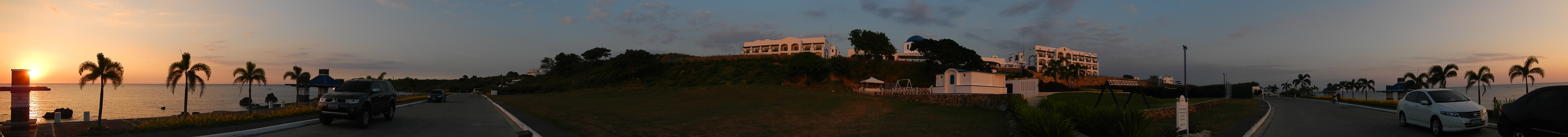
Dusk panorama of the Resort-Hotel

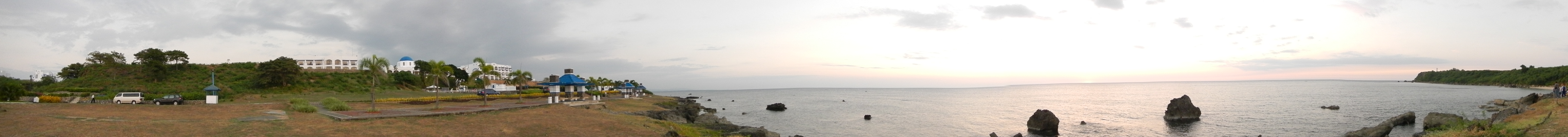
Panorama of the Prime property in sunset-sea

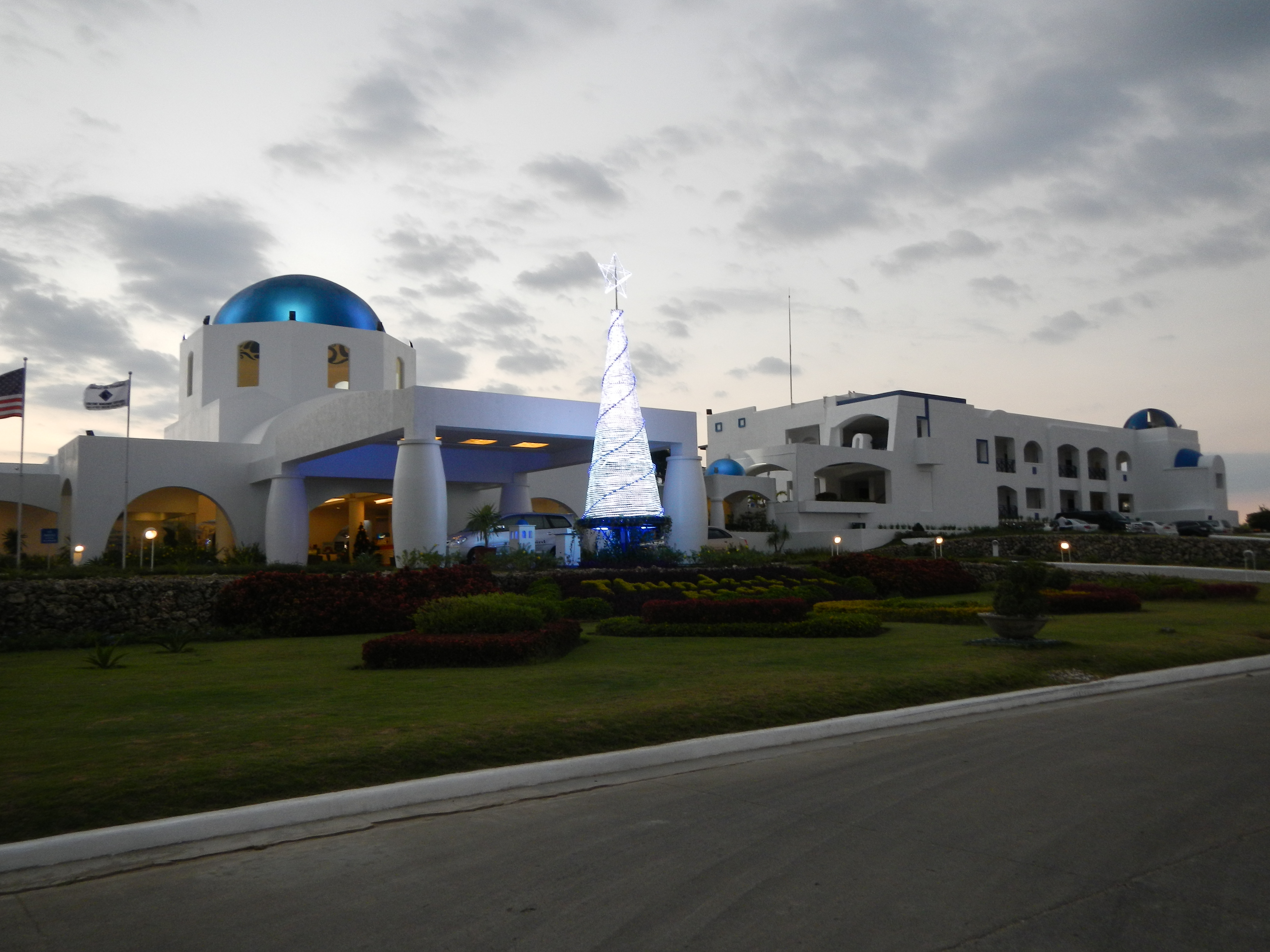
Right façade

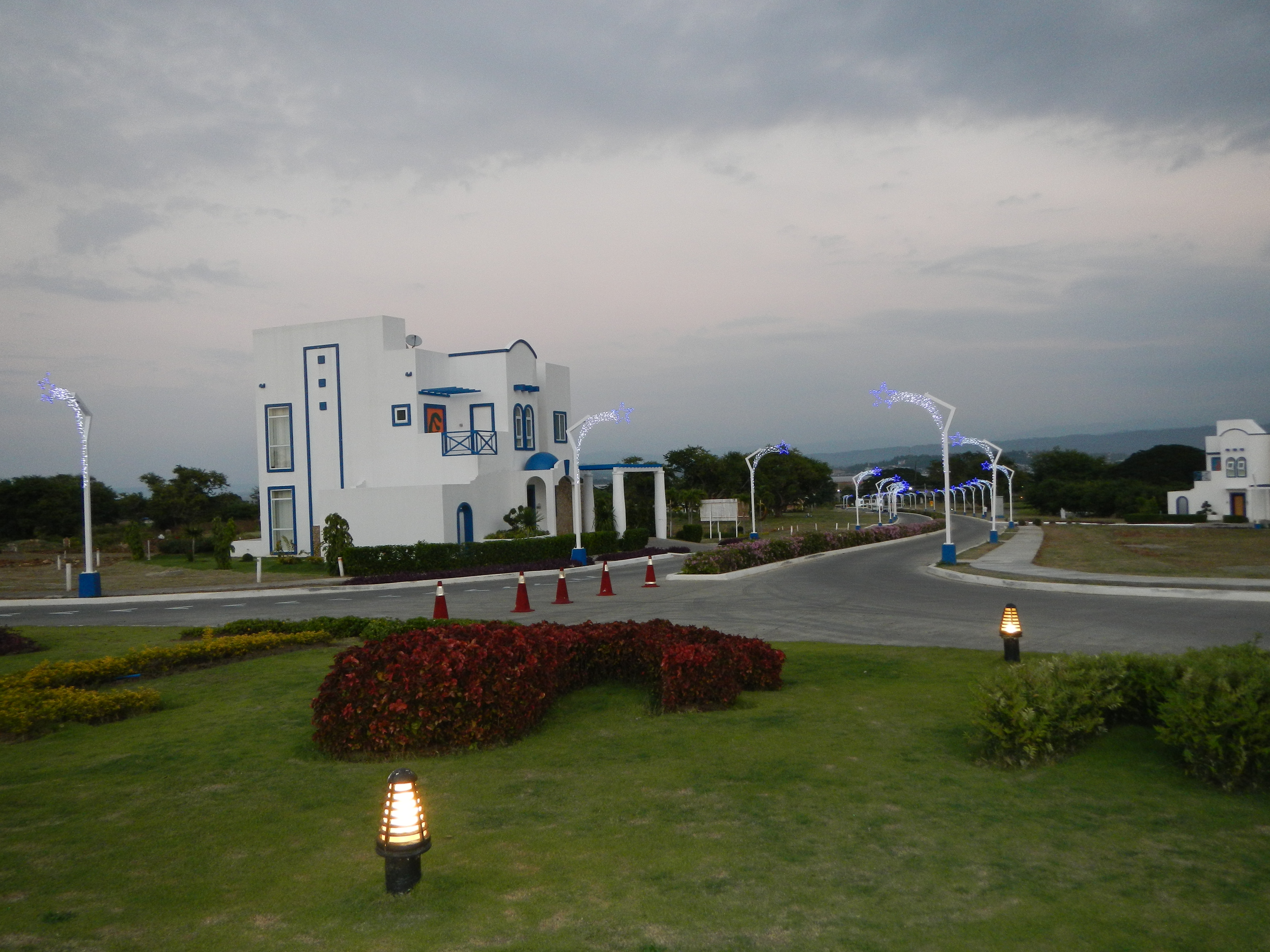
Remote view of the hotel

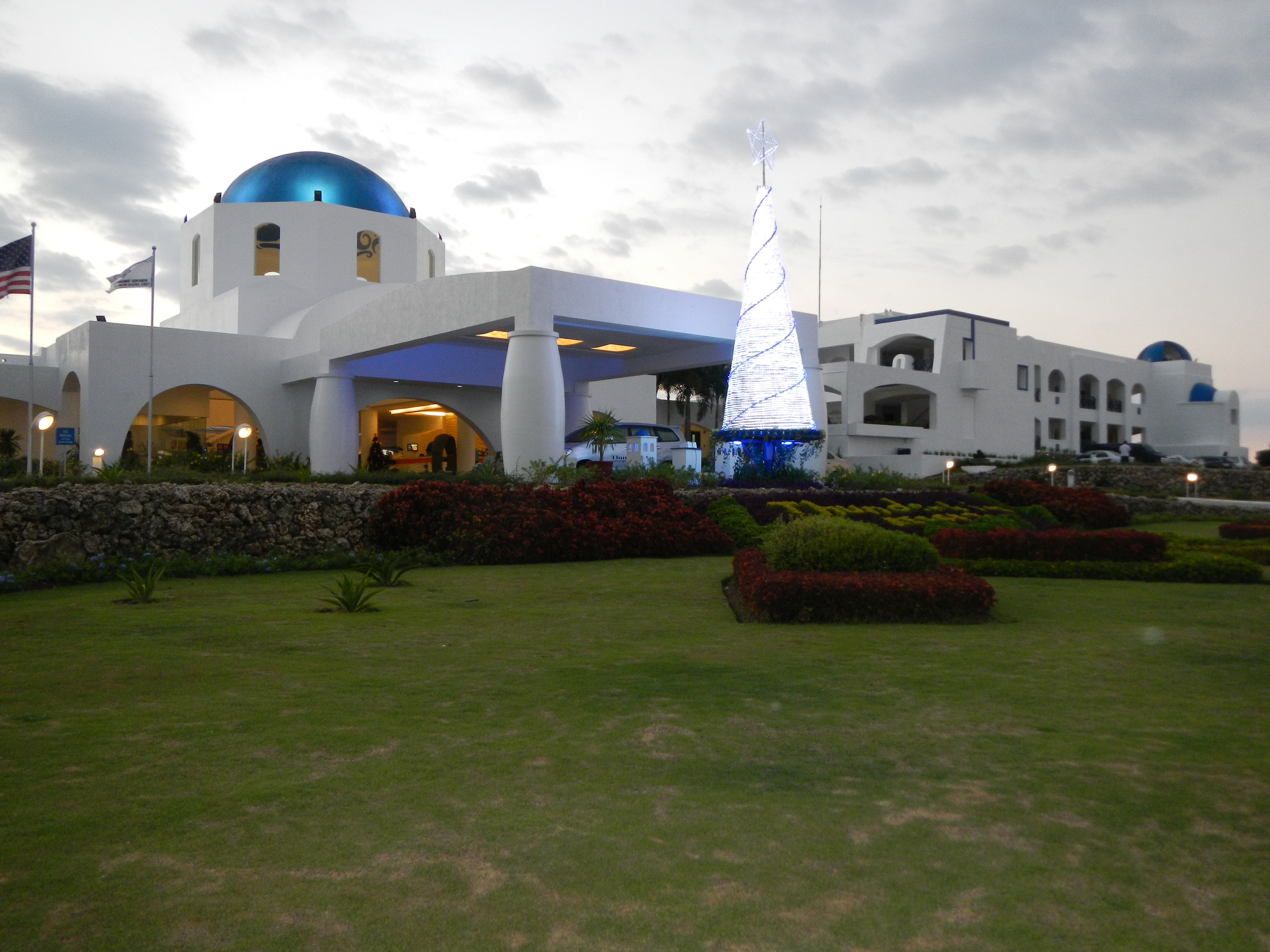
Right façade

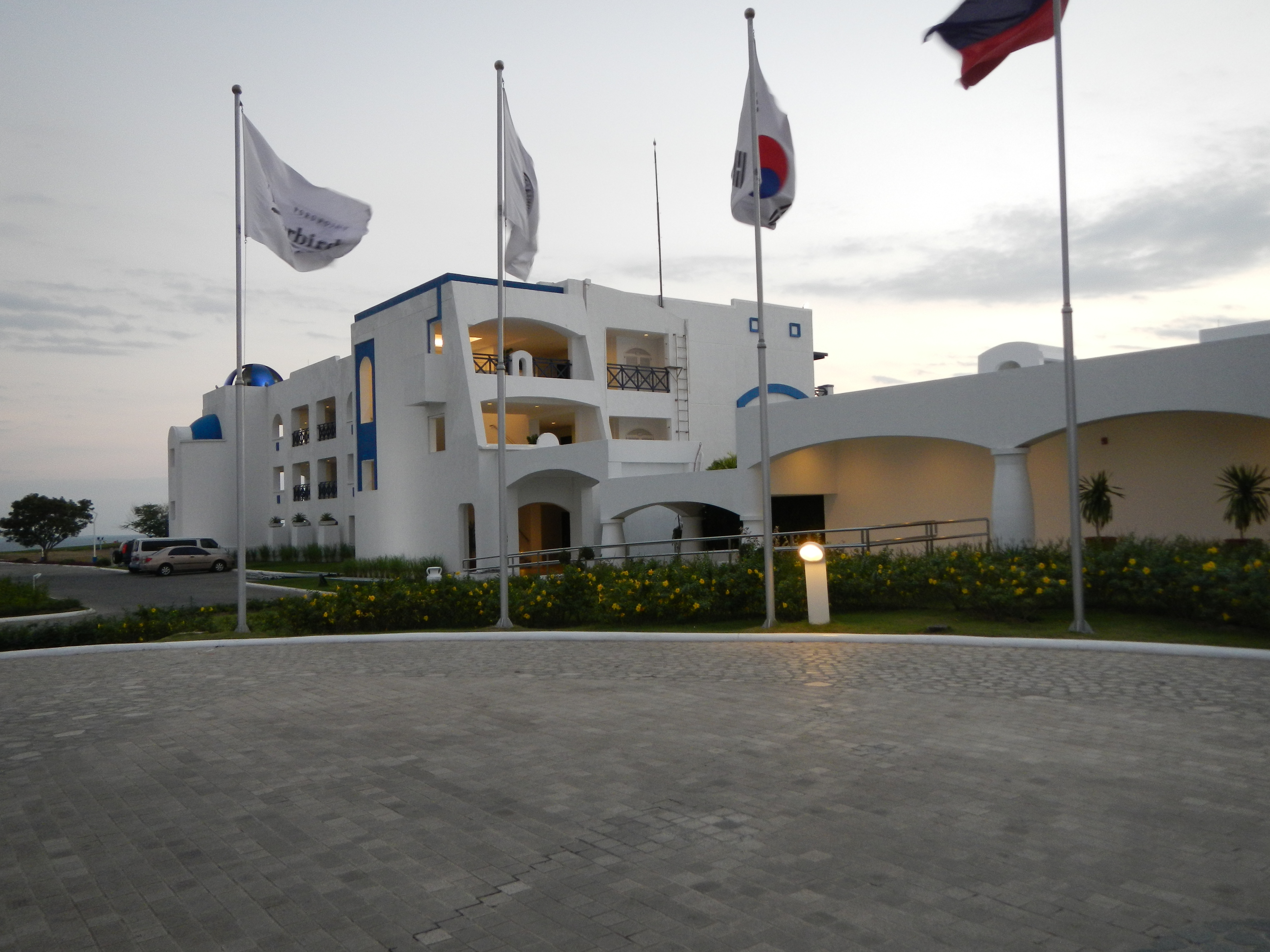
The hotel

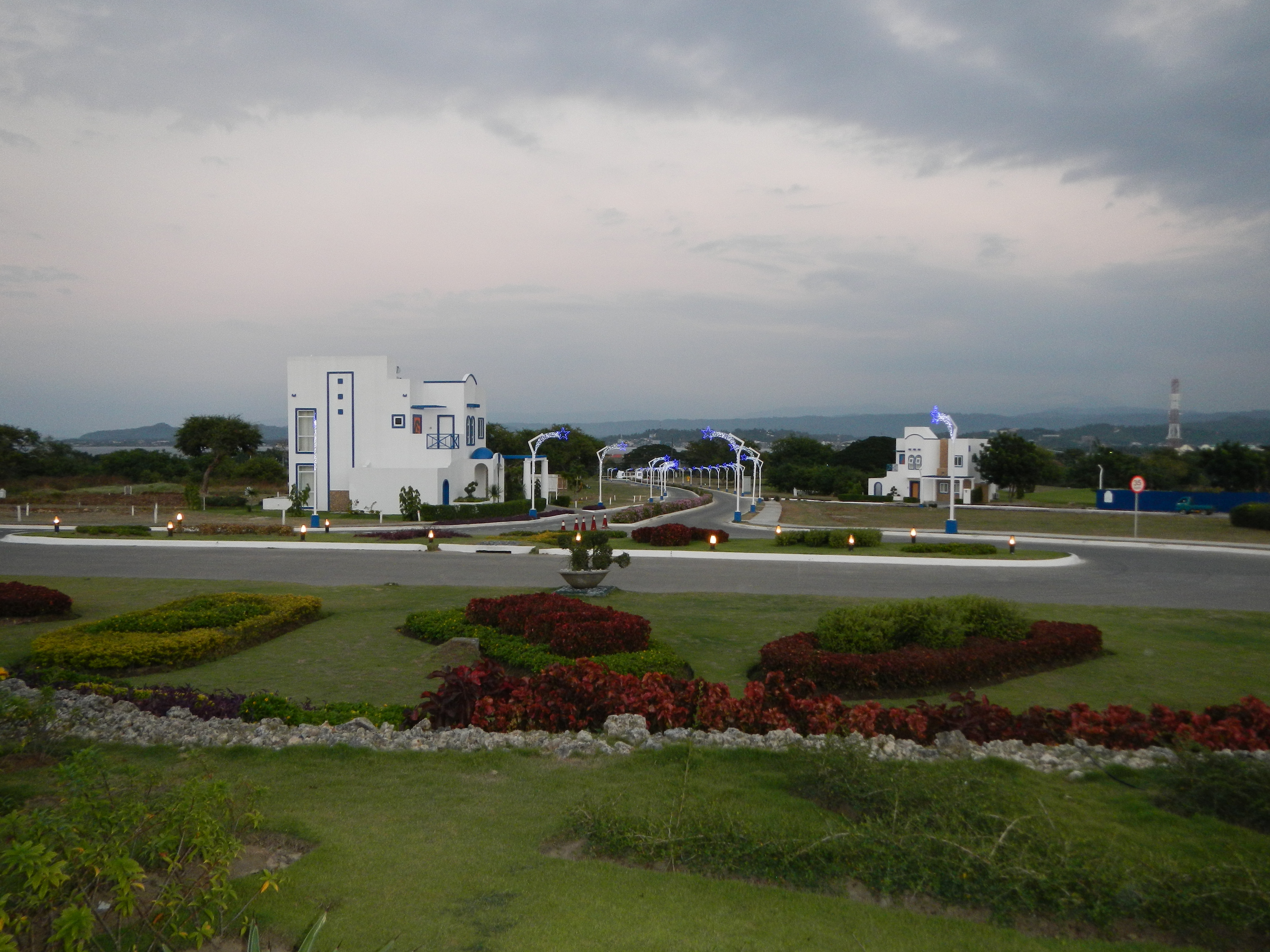
Far façade

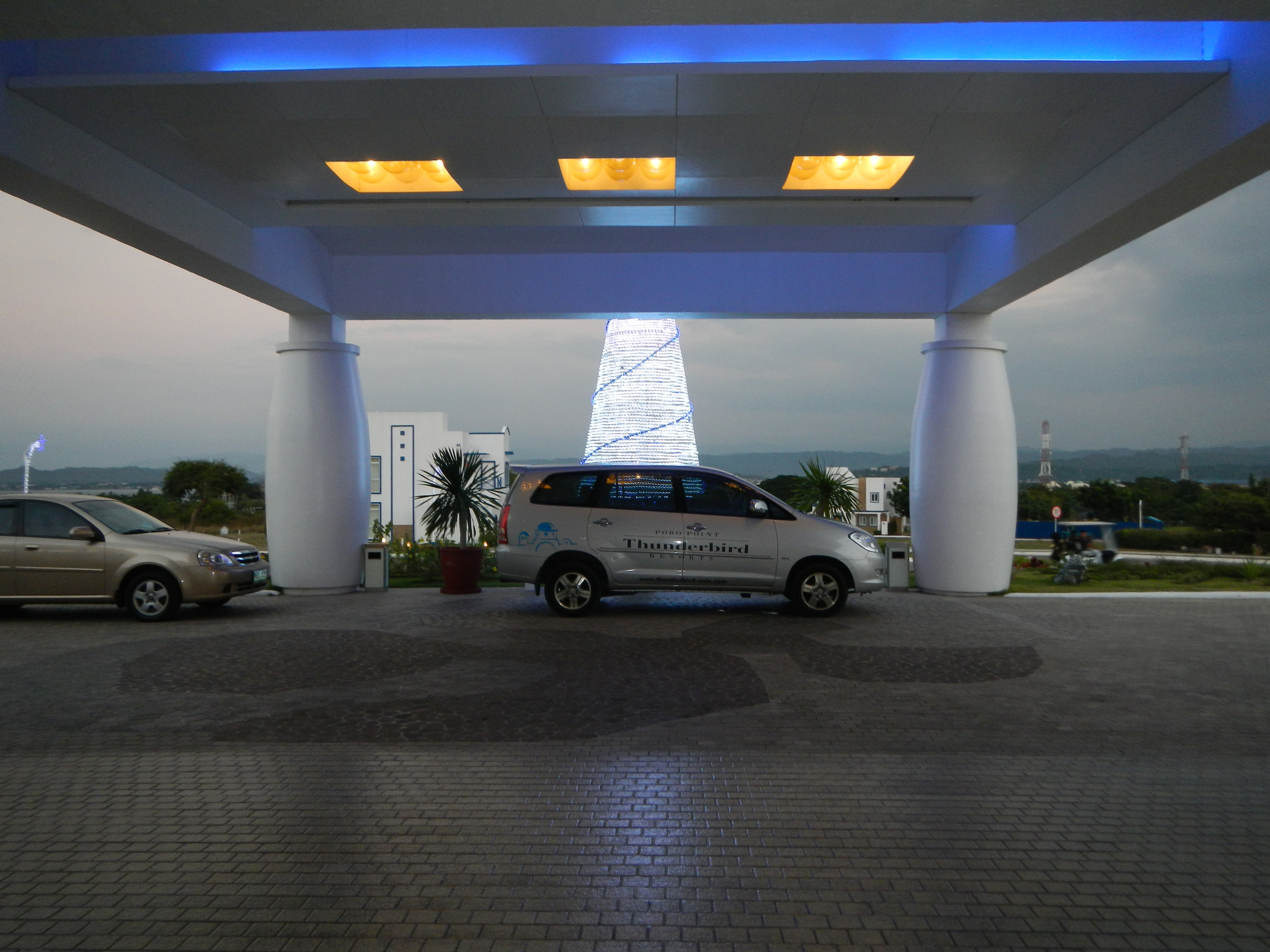
View from the hotel entrance, driveway

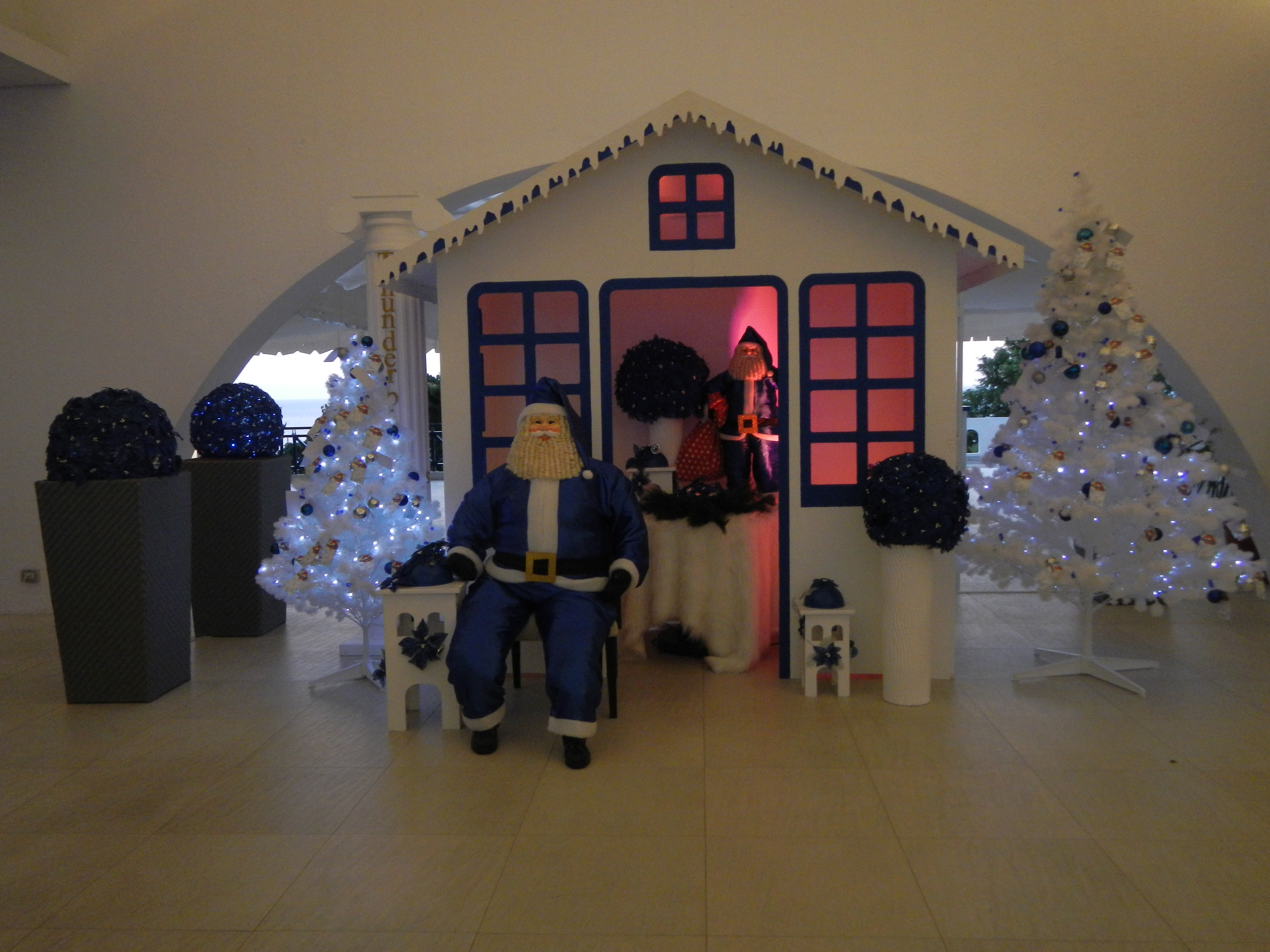
The 2012 Christmas (hotel interior)

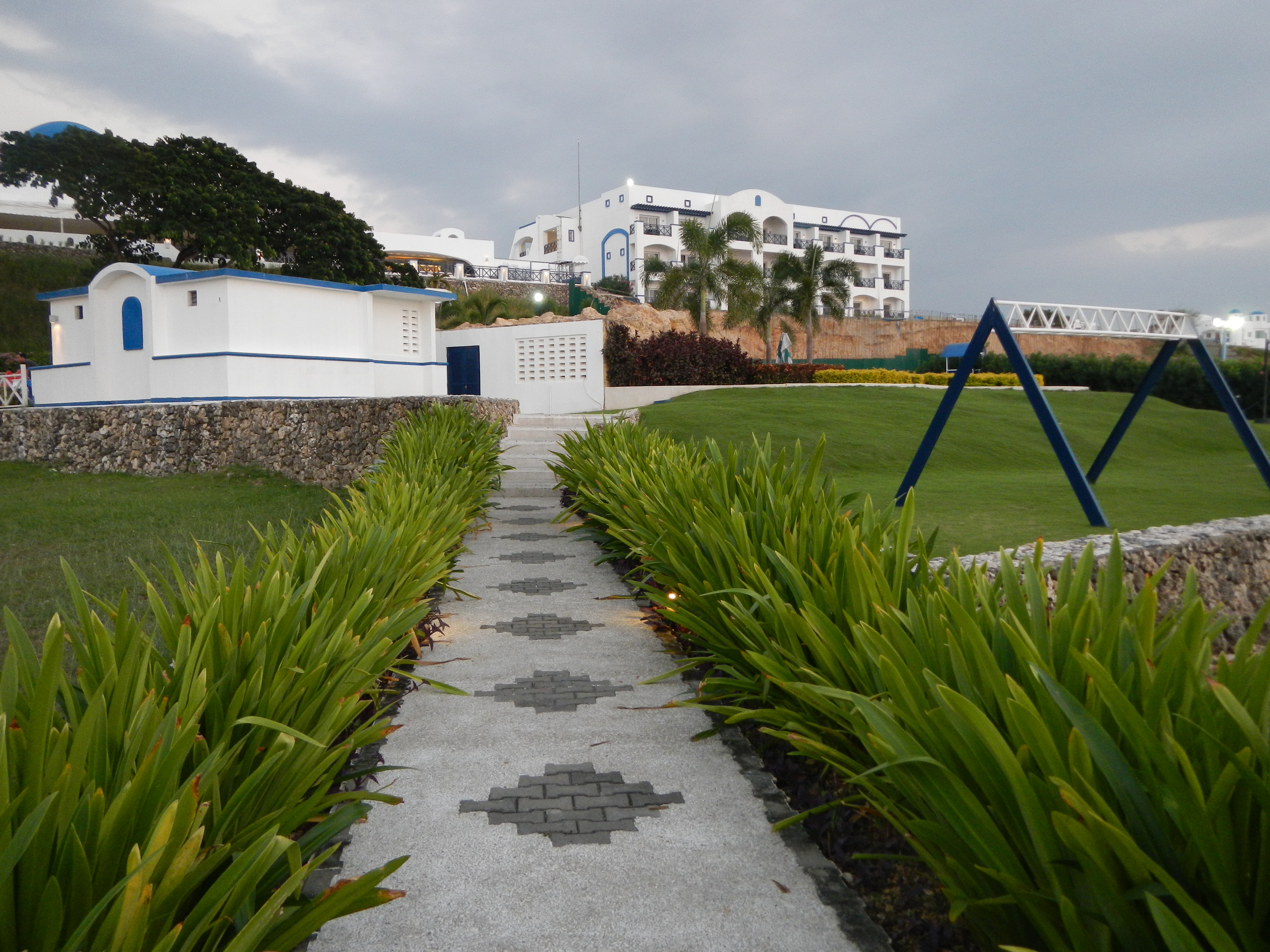
The greens guard the white

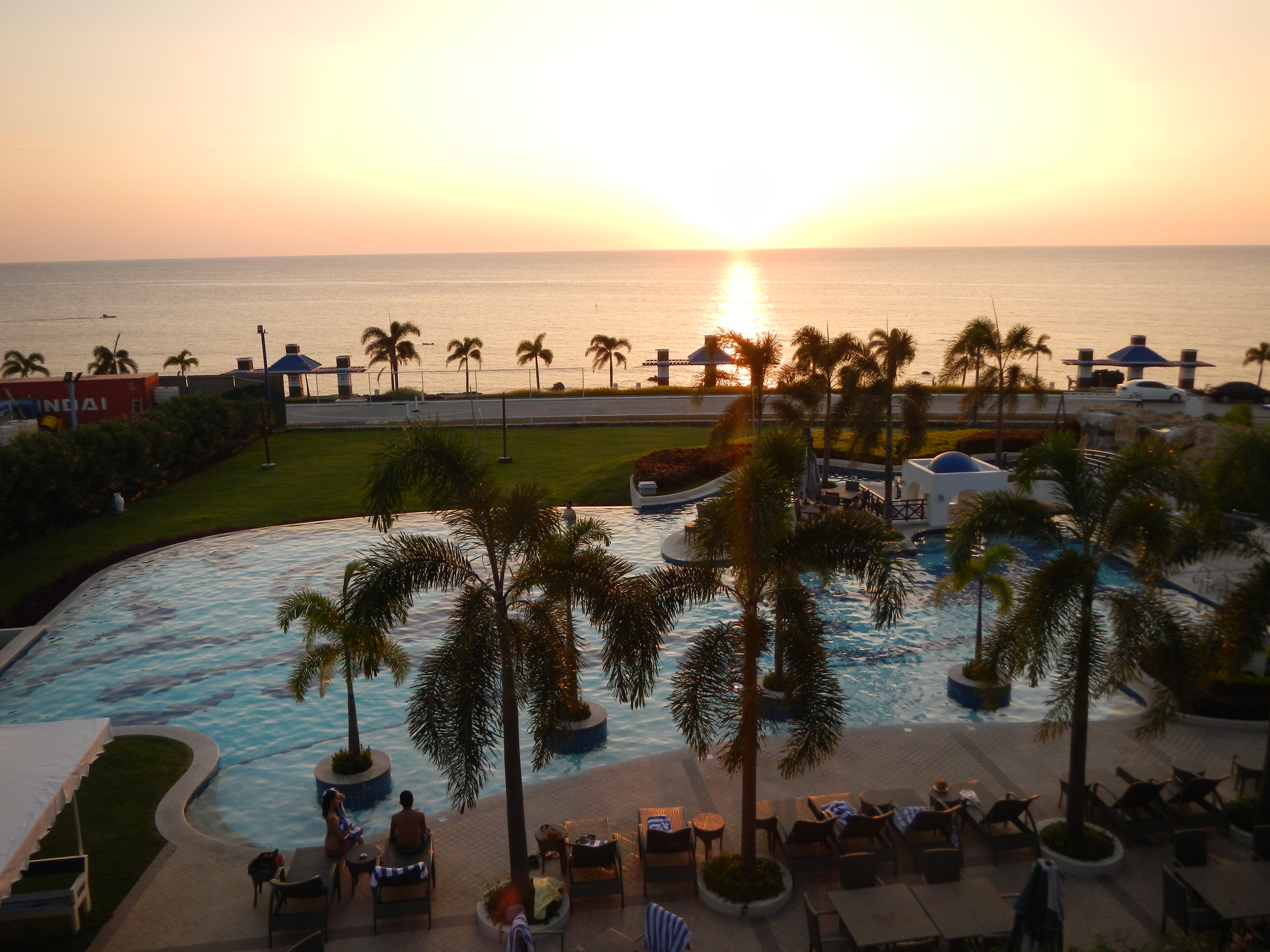
Swimming pool

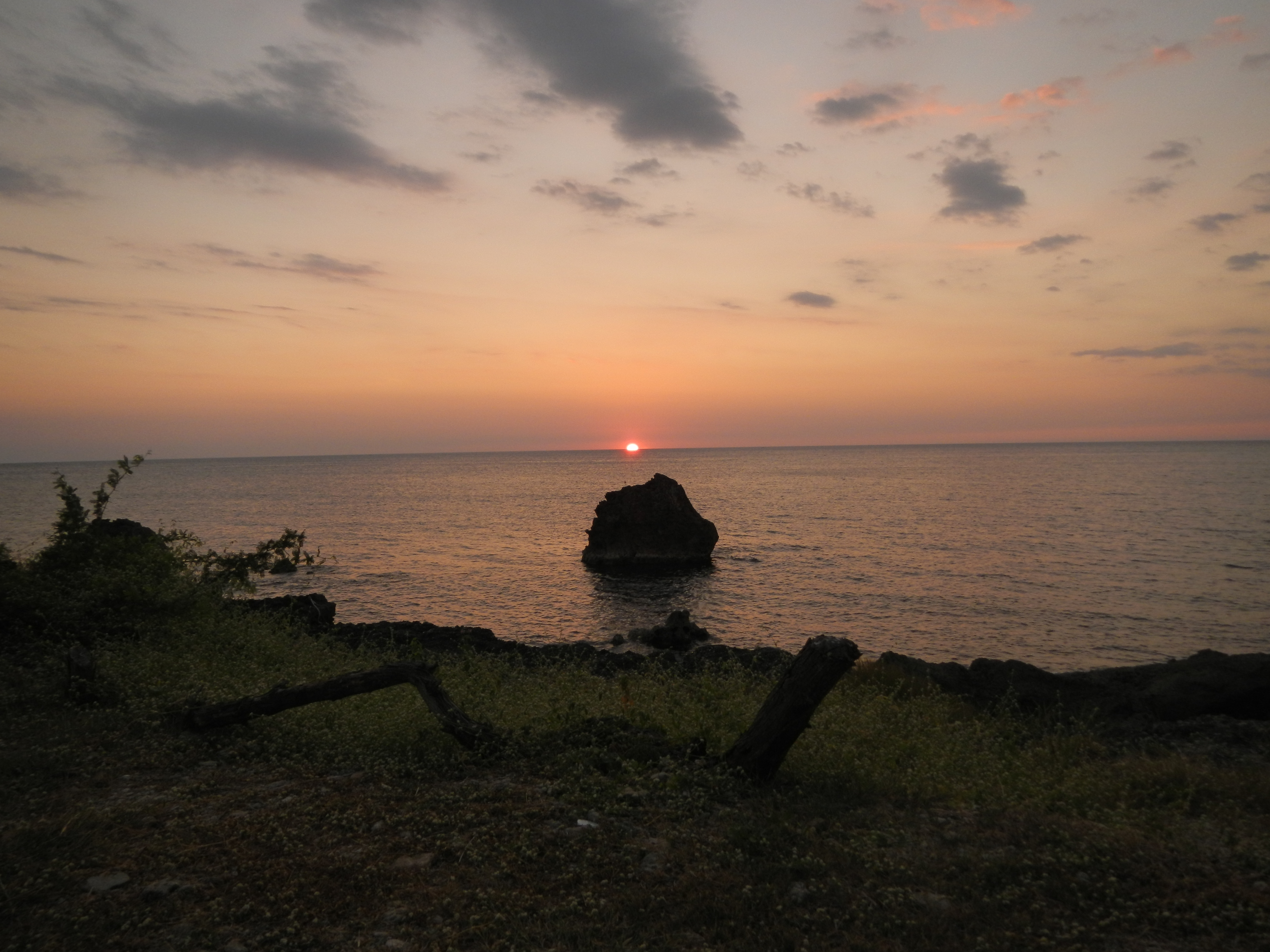
The bloody sunset and the calm seas

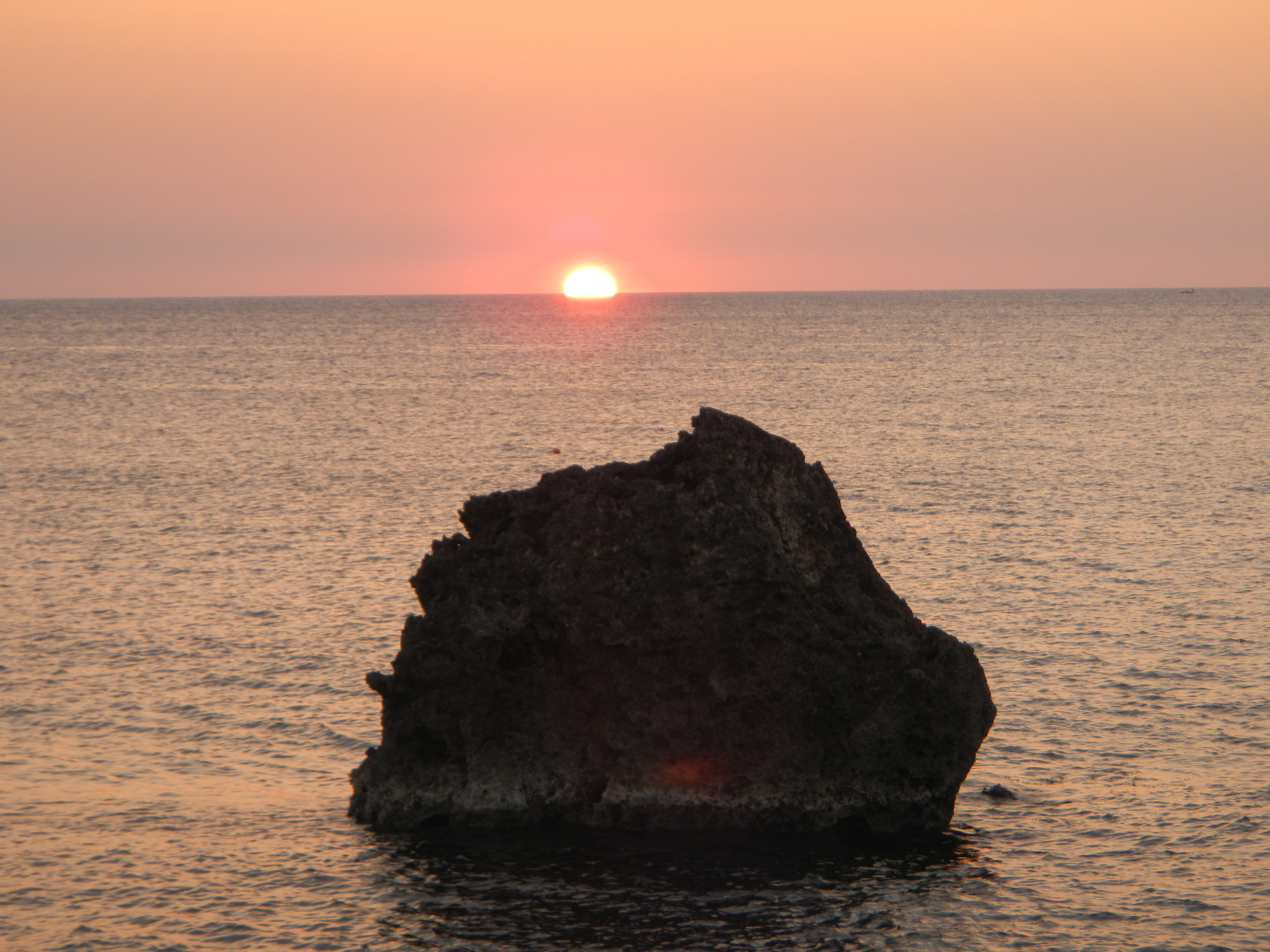
Poro Point Special Economic and Freeport Zone (San Fernando, La Union) Beach Sunset is one of the most beautiful in Philippines

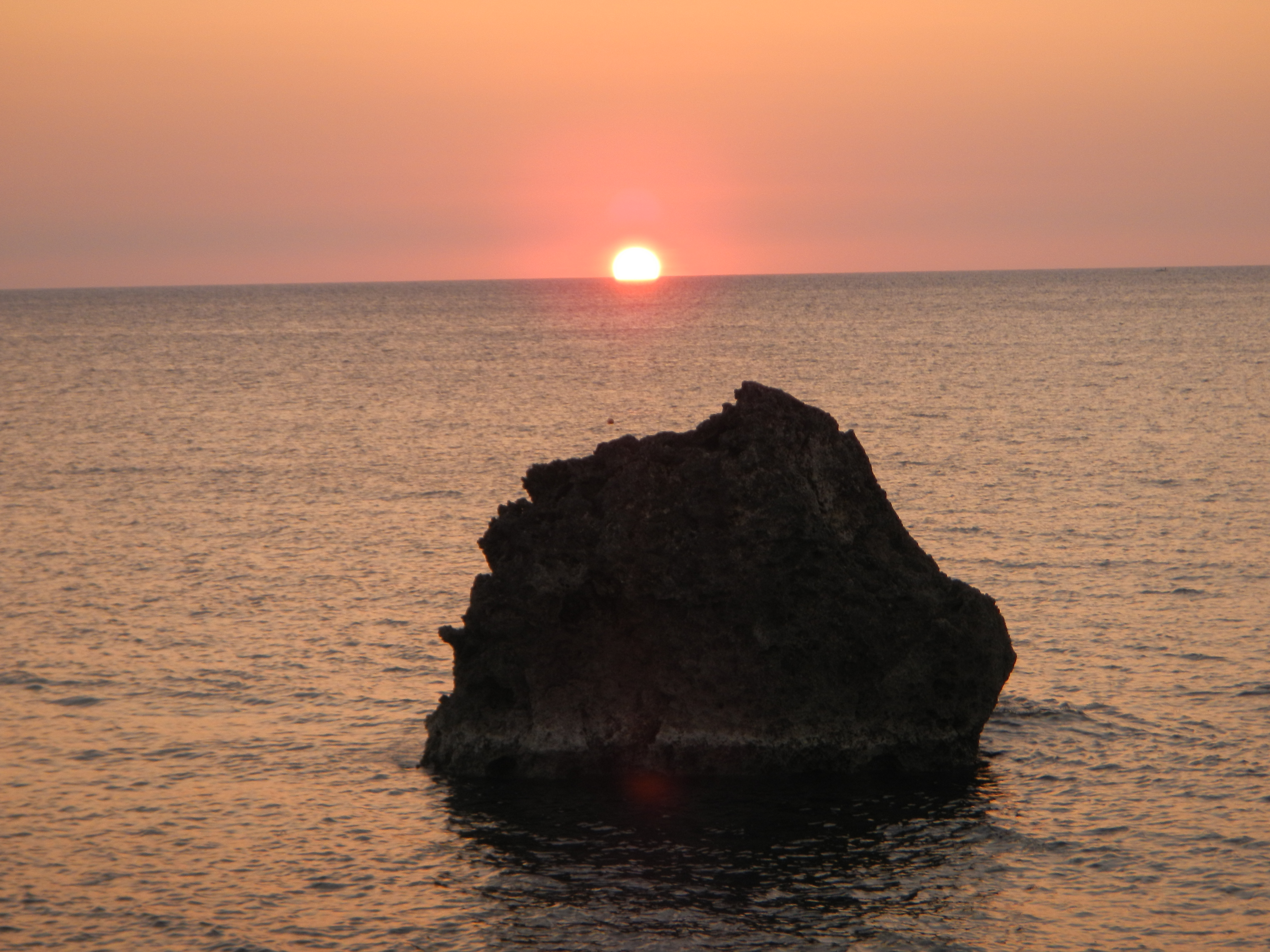

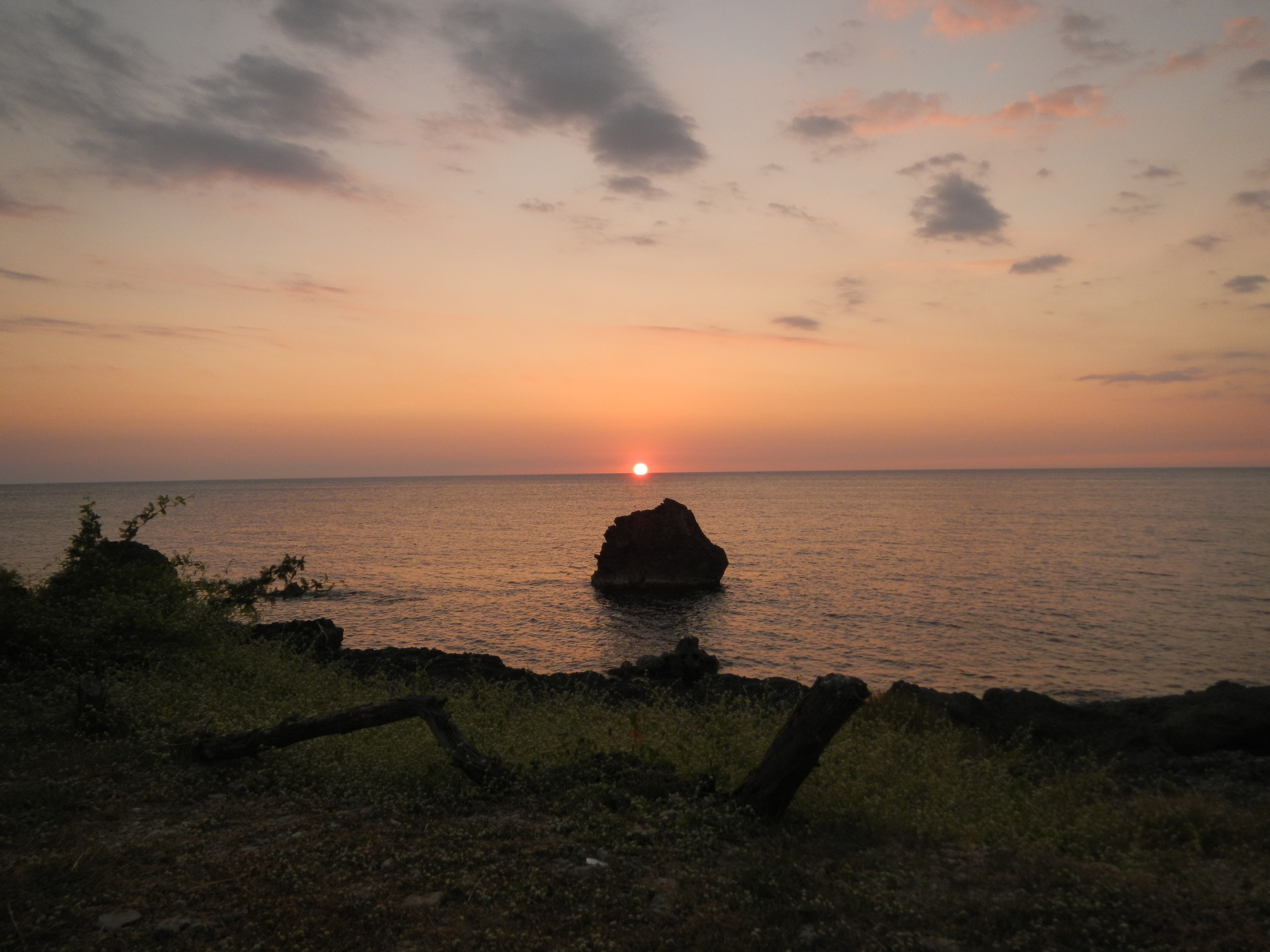

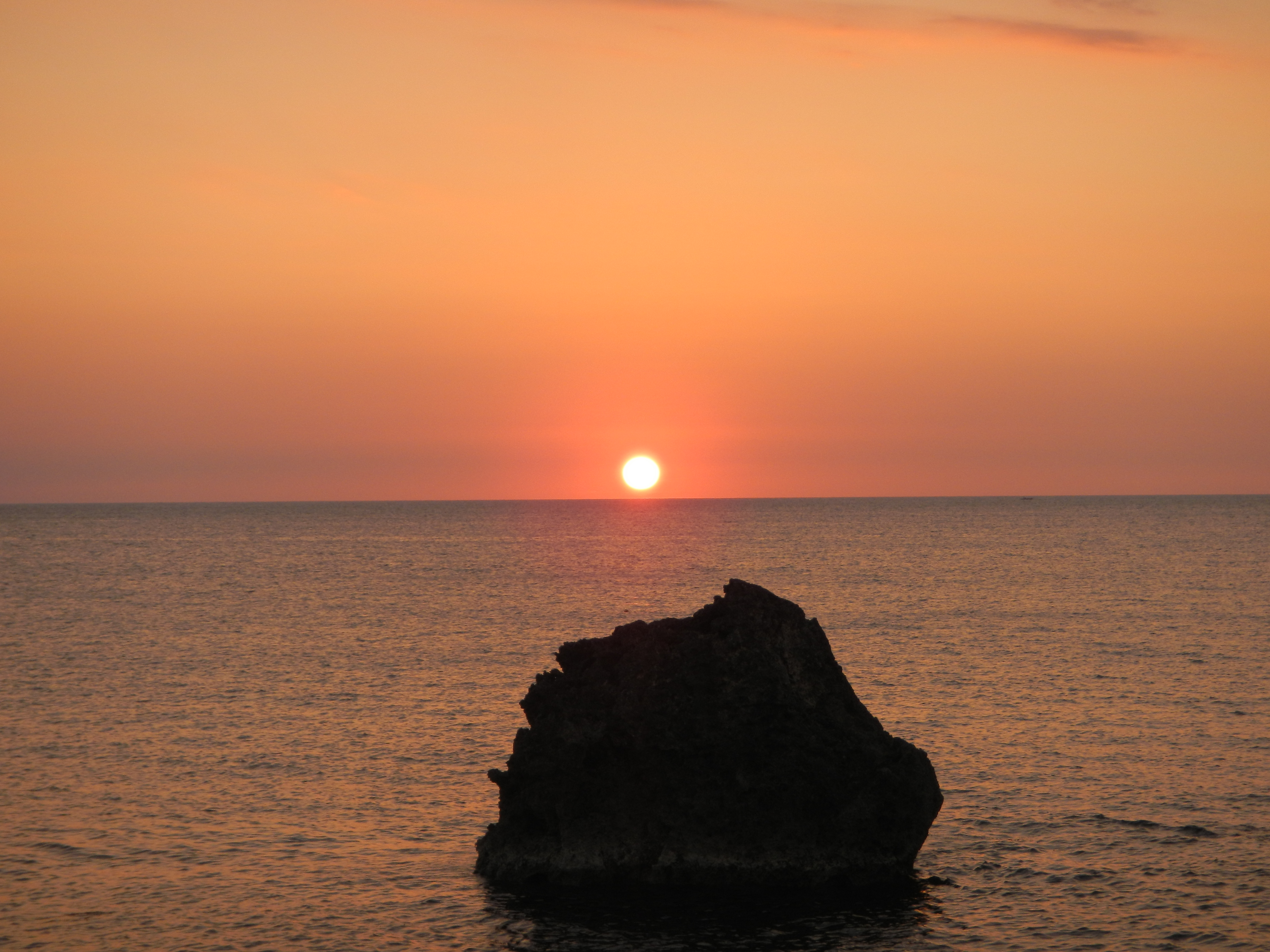

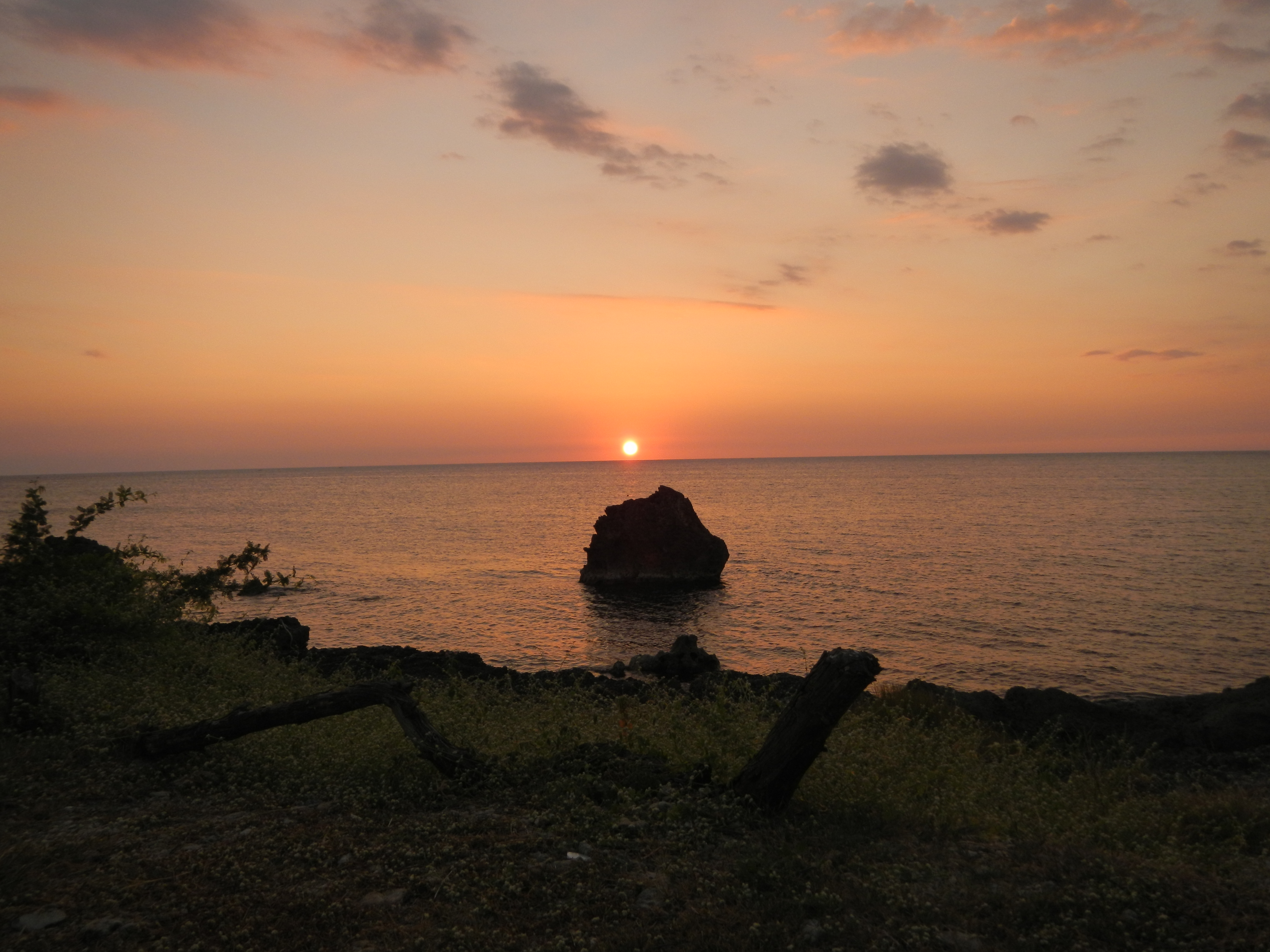

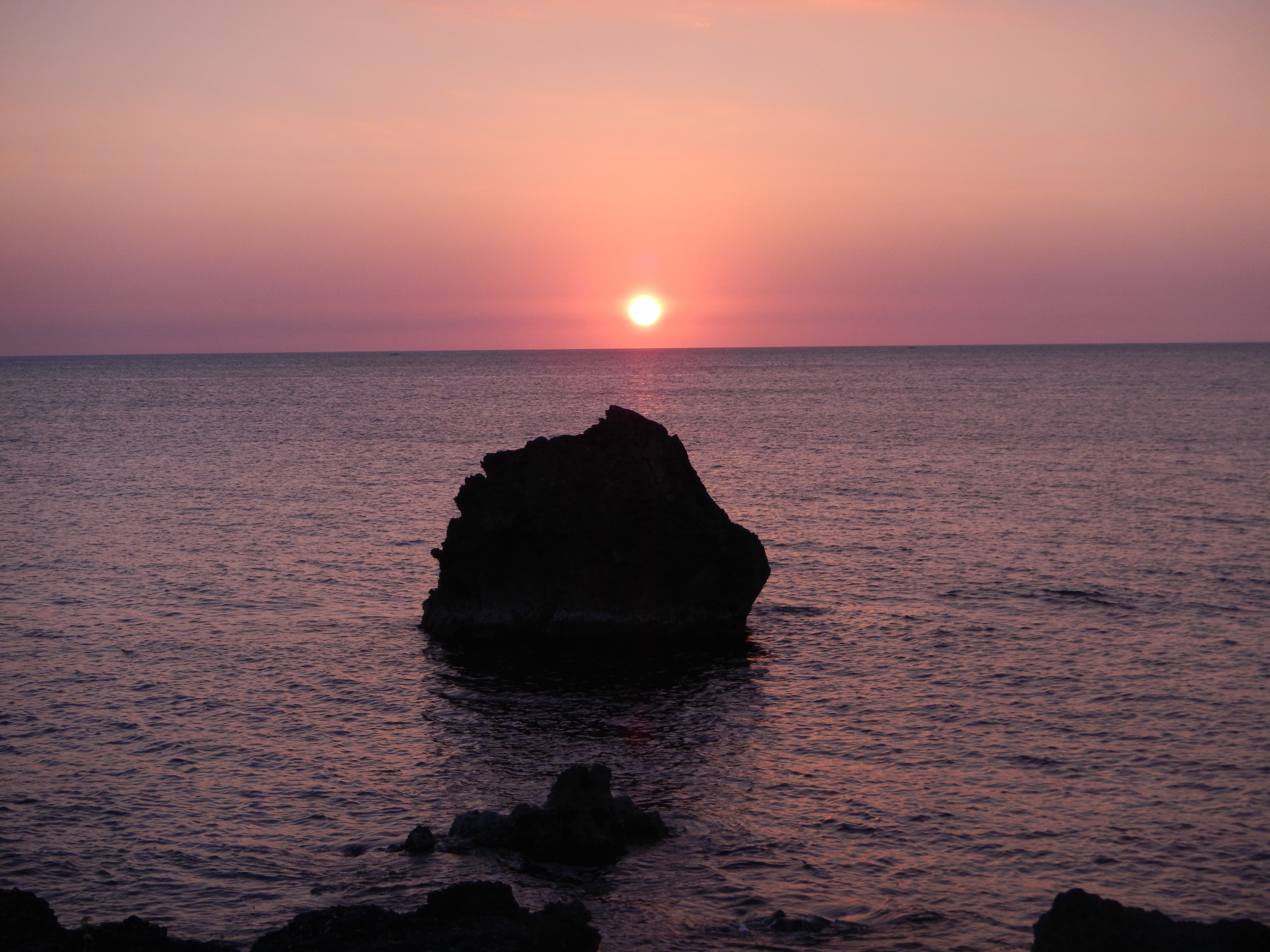

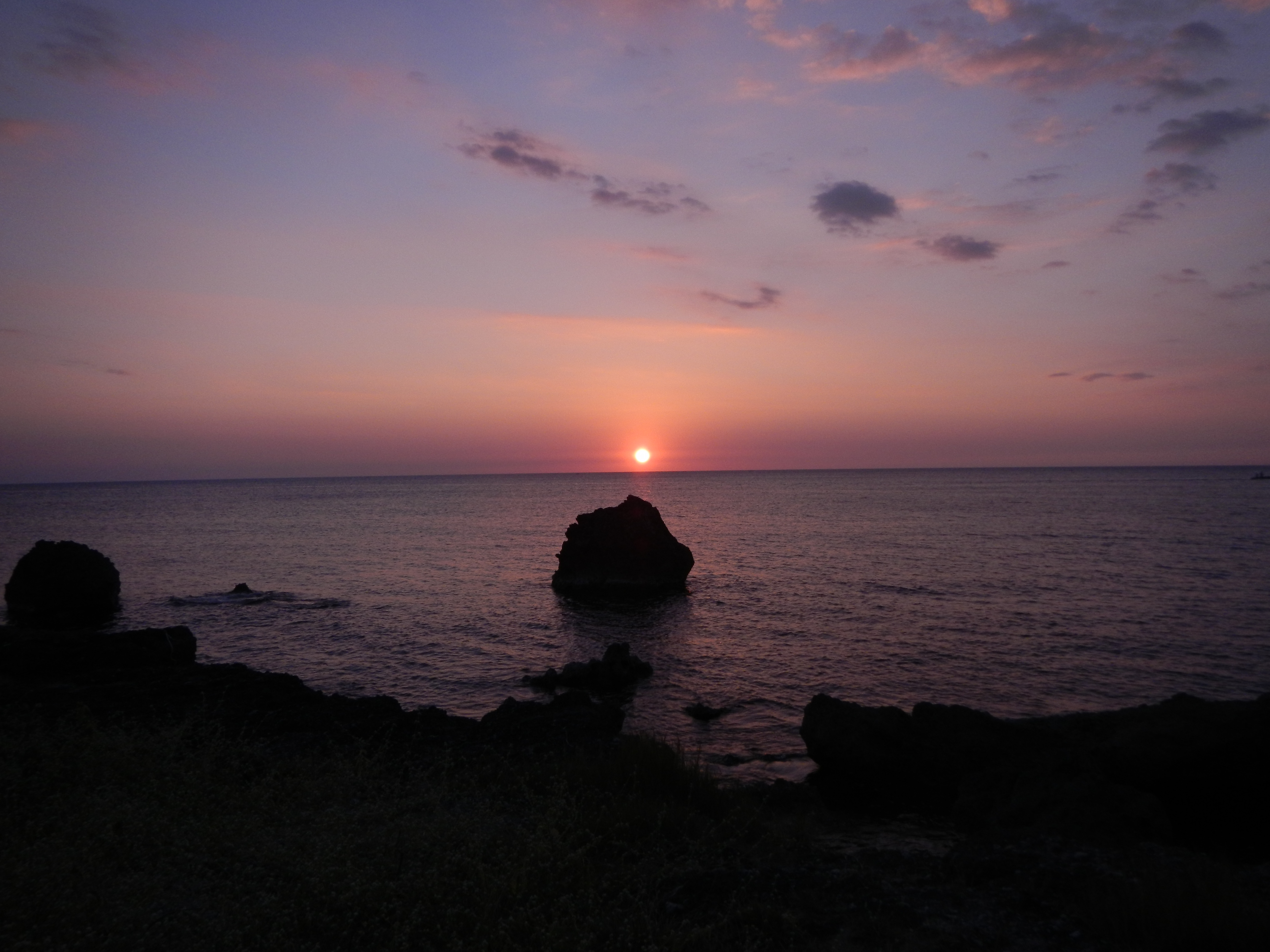

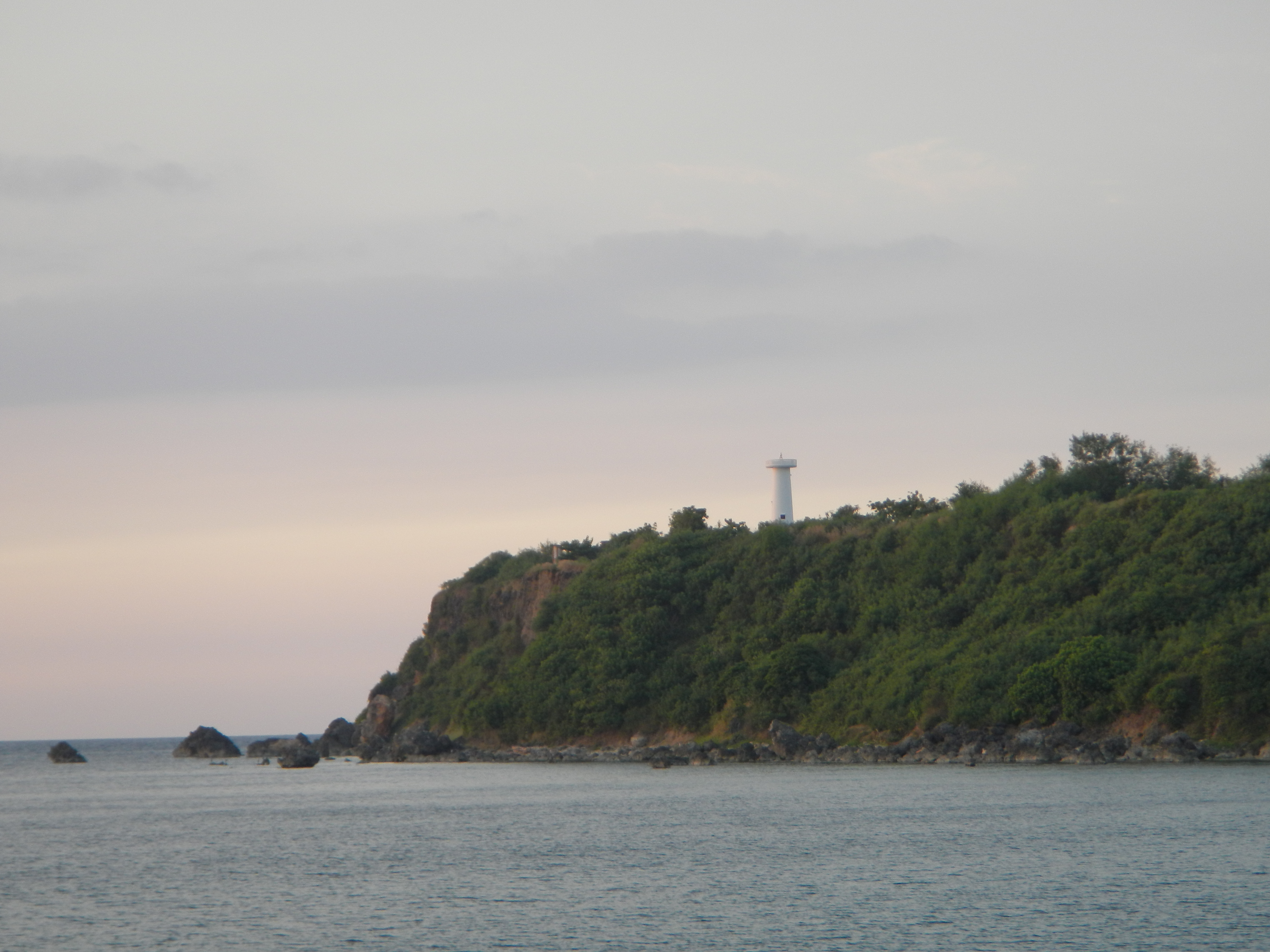
The lighthouse

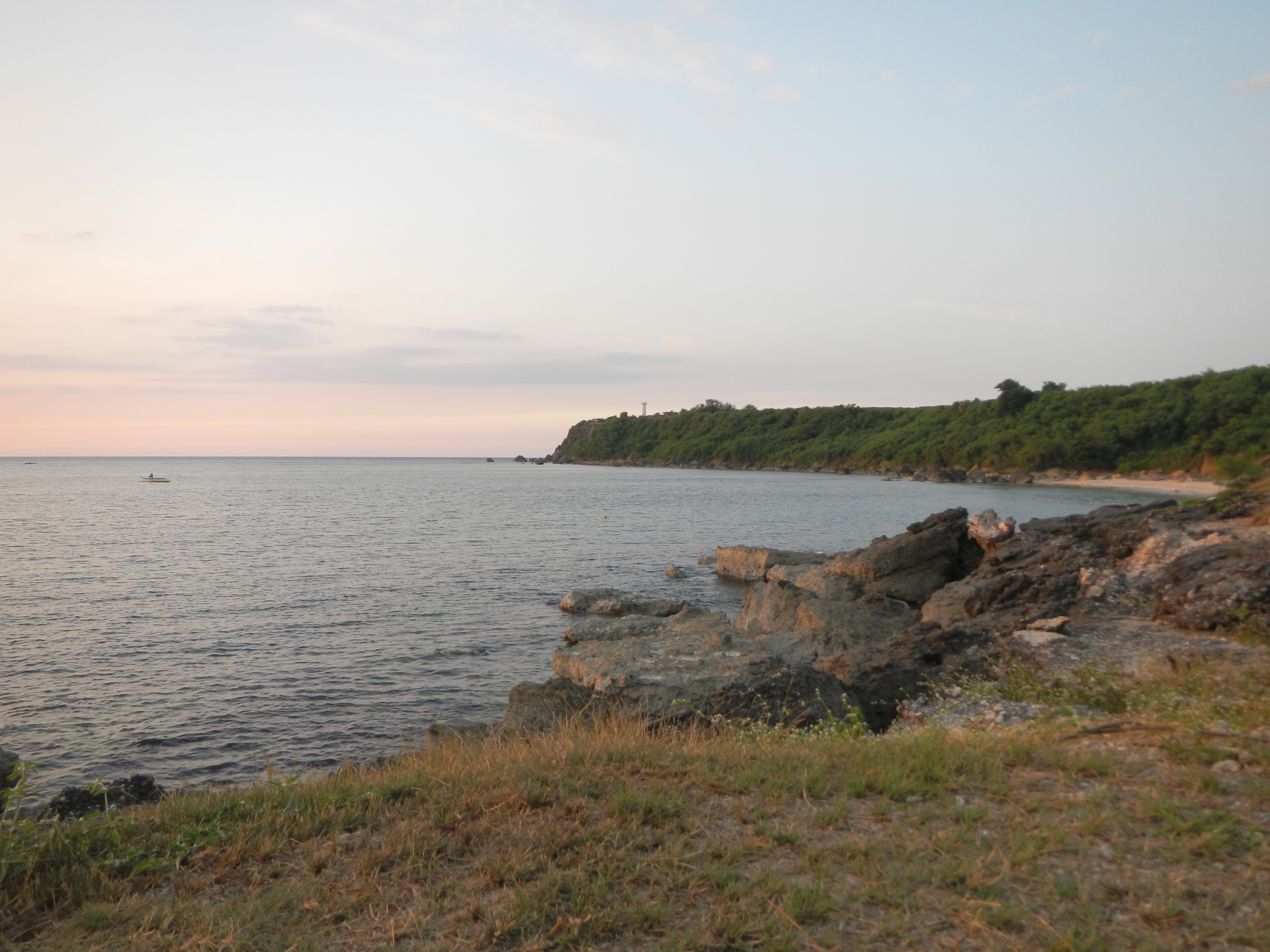
The golf course and the far lighthouse at the Wallace Air Station

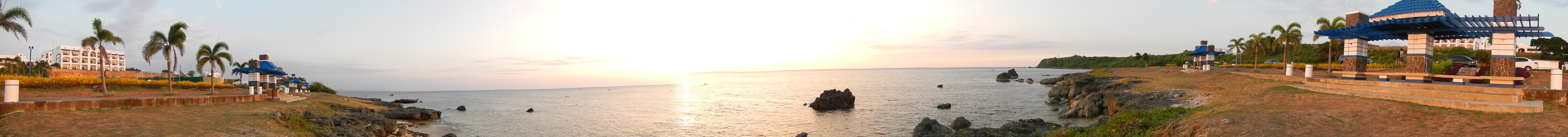
Panorama of the sunset (the deepest Seas and the Villas, Hotel-Resort)

== See also ==
- Economy of the Philippines
- List of integrated resorts
