= List of special economic zones in the Philippines =

This is the list of special economic zones (SEZ) in the Philippines created and mandated by the Congress of the Philippines through legislative enactments both by the House of Representatives and Philippine Senate. The list includes general SEZs and the more specific free trade zones and free ports, managed either by the Philippine Economic Zone Authority, other government agencies, or held privately.

As of April 30, 2016, there were 345 operating economic zones throughout the Philippines.

== Types ==
Special economic zones are categorized as follows:

- Agro-industrial economic zones (22)
- Free ports and special economic zones
- IT parks/centers (262)
- Manufacturing economic zones (74)
- Medical tourism parks/centers (2)
- Tourism economic zone (19)

=== Agro-industrial economic zones ===
Name	Location	Developer/Operator	Region	Area (Hectares)
Agrotex Gensan Economic Zone	Barrio Tambler, General Santos	Agrotex Commodities, Inc.	R-XII	11
AJMR Agro-Industrial Economic Zone	AJMR Port Complex, Km. 20 Tibungco, Davao City	AJMR Port Services Corporation	R-XI	8.96
Balo-i Agro-Industrial Economic Zone	Brgy. Maria Cristina, Balo-i, Lanao del Norte	Balo-i Industrial. Inc.	R-X	13.9
Carmen Cebu Gum Industrial Zone	Cogon West, Carmen, Cebu	Pacific Poly Gums Holdings Corporation	R-VII	7.6
CIIF Agro-Industrial Park - Davao	KM 9.5, Brgy. Sasa, Davao City	CIIF Agro-Industrial Park, Inc.	R-XI	8.54
DADC Economic Zone	Brgy. Darong, Santa Cruz, Davao del Sur	Darong Agricultural and Development Corp.	R-XI	15
Ecofuel Agro-Industrial Ecozone	Sta. Filomena, San Mariano, Isabela	Ecofuel Land Development, Inc.	R-II	24
Kamanga Agro-Industrial Economic Zone	Brgy. Kamanga, Maasim, Sarangani	Kamanga Agro-Industrial Ecozone Development Corporation	R-XII	54.6
New Jubilee Agro-Industrial Economic Zone	Brgy. Hilapnitan, Baybay, Leyte	New Jubilee International Holdings, Inc.	R-VIII	4.98
Philippine Packing Agricultural Export Processing Zone	Bugo, Cagayan de Oro	Philippine Packing Management Services Corporation	R-X	27
Pueblo I.T. Ecozone	Upper Carmen, Cagayan de Oro	Pueblo de Oro I.T. Park	R-X	23
Samar Agro-Industrial Economic Zone	Brgy. Malajog, Tinambacan District, Calbayog, Samar	Hi Best Property Developer Corporation	R-VIII	7.26
San Carlos Ecozone	Palampas and Punao, San Carlos, Negros Occidental	San Julio Reality, Inc.	R-VII	25.79
Sarangani Agro-Industrial Eco Zone	Alabel, Sarangani	Alsons Development & Investment Corporation	R-XII	317.24
Sarangani Economic Development Zone	Cannery, Polomolok, South Cotabato	Sarangani Resources Corporation	R-XII	72.87
SRC Allah Valley Economic Development Zone	Tubi-Allah, Surallah, South Cotabato	Sarangani Resources Corporation	R-XII	56.1
SRC Calumpang Economic Development Zone	Calumpang, General Santos	Sarangani Resources Corporation	R-XII	18.67
Valencia Special Economic Zone	Brgy. Palinpinon, Valencia, Negros Oriental	Municipal Government of Valencia, Negros Oriental	R-VII	4.33

=== Free ports and special economic zones ===
Economic zone	Address	Location	Management	Website
Aurora Pacific Economic Zone and Freeport	Casiguran, Aurora	Luzon	Aurora Pacific Economic Zone and Freeport Authority	Aurora Pacific Economic Zone and Freeport
Alviera Industrial Park	Porac, Pampanga	Luzon	Philippine Economic Zone Authority	
Cagayan Special Economic Zone	Santa Ana and Aparri, Cagayan	Luzon	Cagayan Economic Zone Authority	CEZA website
Freeport Area of Bataan	Mariveles, Bataan	Luzon	Authority of the Freeport Area of Bataan	FAB website
Cavite Economic Zone	Rosario and General Trias, Cavite	Luzon	Philippine Economic Zone Authority	
Clark Freeport Zone	Angeles City and Mabalacat, Pampanga, and Capas and Bamban, Tarlac	Luzon	Clark Development Corporation (under Bases Conversion and Development Authority)	CDC website
Subic Bay Freeport Zone	Olongapo and Subic, Zambales, and Hermosa and Morong, Bataan	Luzon	Subic Bay Metropolitan Authority	SBMA website
Poro Point Freeport Zone	Poro Point, San Fernando, La Union	Luzon	Poro Point Management Corporation (under Bases Conversion and Development Authority)	PPMC Website
Baguio City Economic Zone	Baguio	Luzon	Philippine Economic Zone Authority	
Mactan Export Processing Zone	Lapu-Lapu City	Visayas	Cebu Port Authority	CPA website
Zamboanga City Special Economic Zone Authority	Zamboanga City	Mindanao	Zamboanga Freeport Authority	ZFA website
Polloc Free Port and Economic Zone	Parang, Maguindanao del Norte	Mindanao	Regional Economic Zone Authority (under Philippine Economic Zone Authority)	REZA-BARMM website
