= Poro Point =

Point in the Philippines

Poro Point San Fernando Point
- Headland
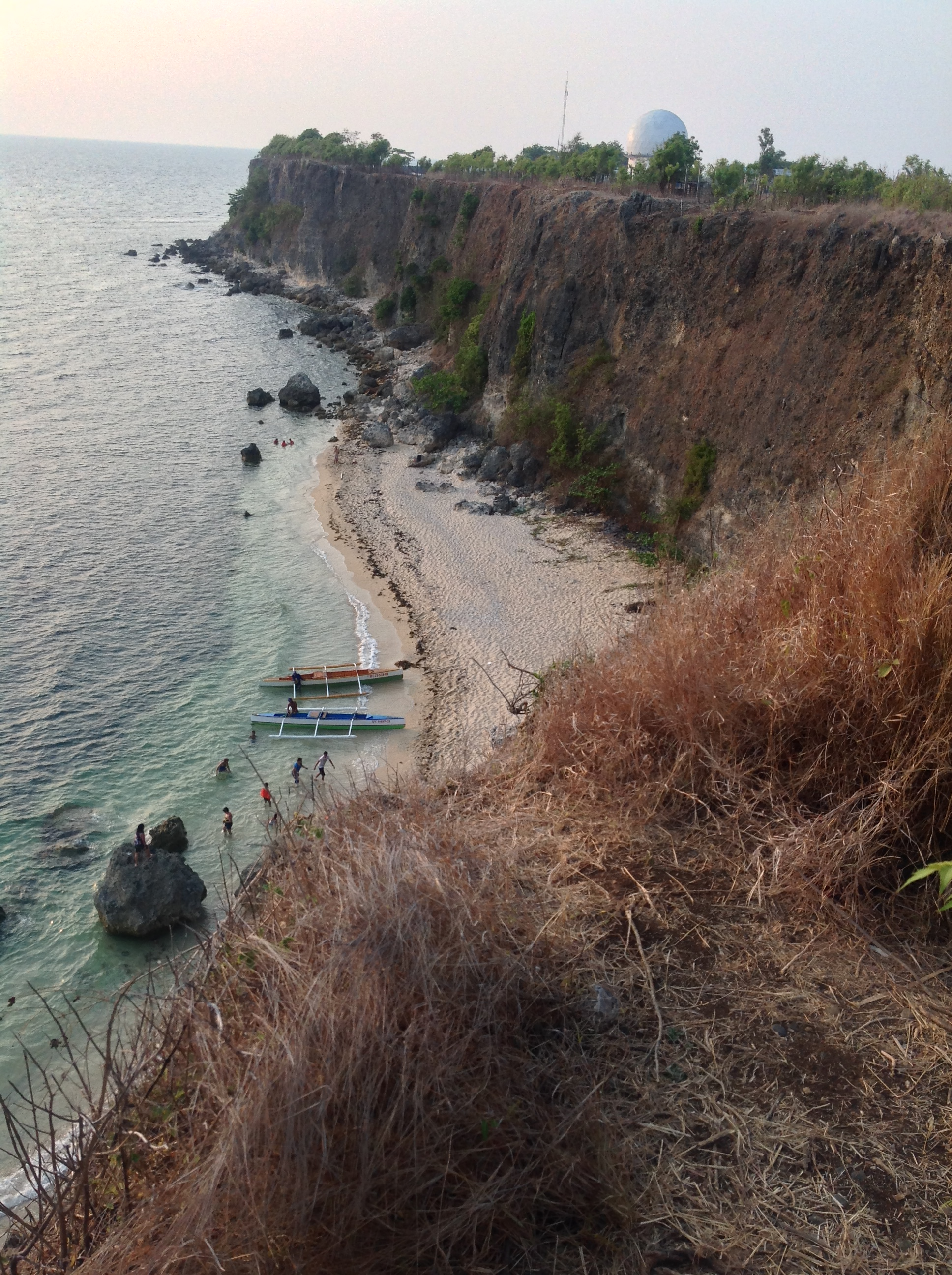
- The cliff at Poro Point, facing the South China Sea

- Location in Philippines
- Coordinates: 16°37′26″N 120°16′54″E
- Location: La Union, Philippines
- Offshore water bodies: South China Sea

Area
  - Total: 1.82 km^{2} (0.70 sq mi)
- Elevation: 84 ft (26 m)

Poro Point, also known historically as San Fernando Point (Spanish: Punta San Fernando), is a headland and peninsula located in the city of San Fernando, La Union, on the island of Luzon in the Philippines. It projects northwesterly about 3.2 kilometres (2.0 mi) into the South China Sea. It was named after its location within barangay Poro and is the site of Poro Point Freeport Zone, a special economic zone established since 1993.

== Geography ==
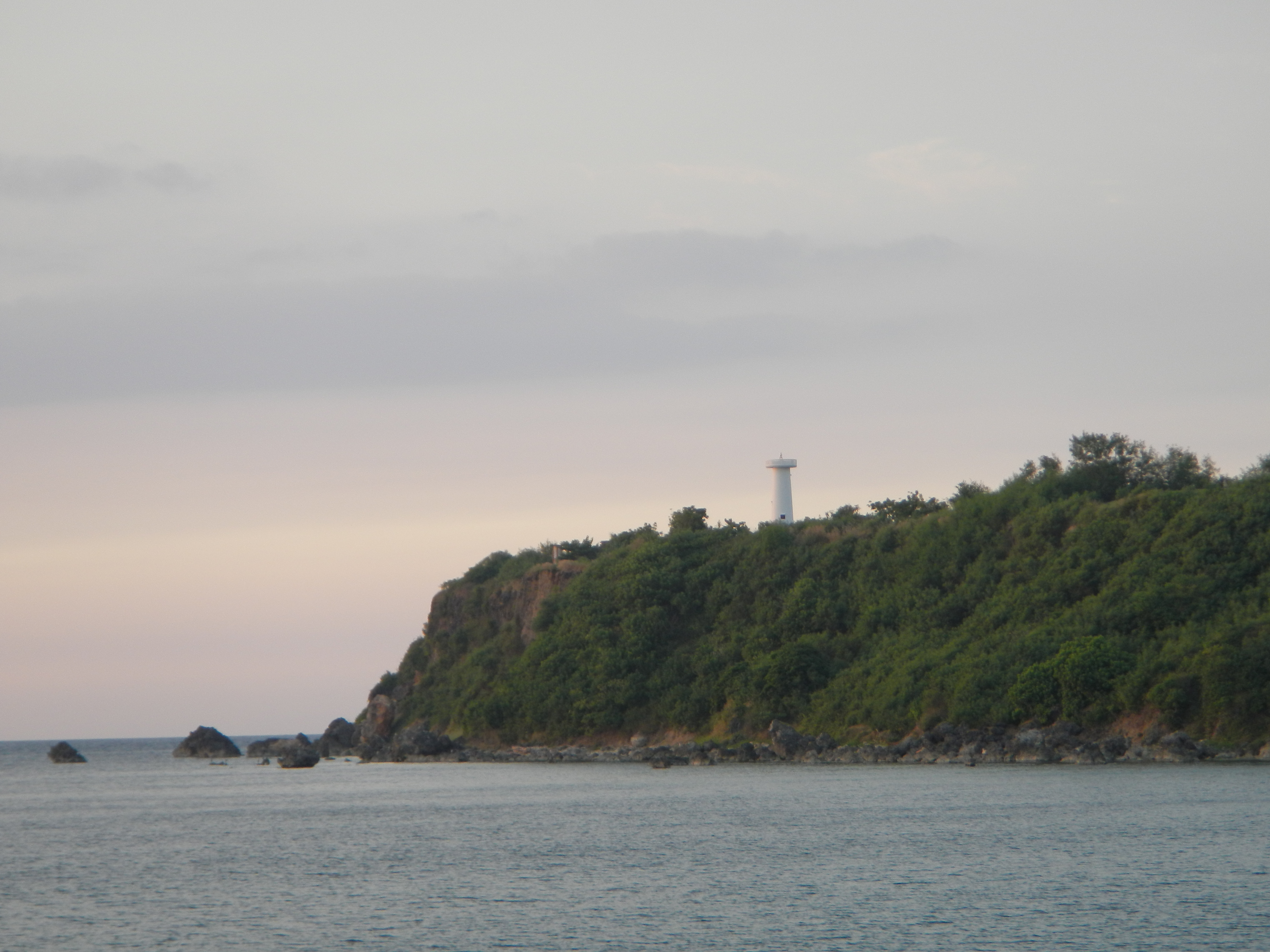
The lighthouse at Poro Point

Poro Point forms the western boundary of San Fernando Bay where the city's downtown core and international seaport are located. To the south, it overlooks Lingayen Gulf which spreads all the way into the northern coast of Pangasinan up to Santiago Island in Bolinao. The headland is about 0.8 kilometres (0.50 mi) wide rising gently to the northwest to an elevation of 84 feet (26 m). White cliffs are prominent features along its western coastline. The southern side of the peninsula contains the 65.5-hectare Greek-inspired Thunderbird Resort with white-sand beaches, a nine-hole golf course and an artificial lake completed in 2008.

The entire peninsula covers an area of 1.82 square kilometres (0.70 sq mi) composed of coralline limestone possibly dating back to the Pleistocene age. It is a habitat of several migrating bird species such as kingfisher, grey heron, starling, and pied triller. The point is located about 2.3 kilometres (1.4 mi) from the San Fernando Airport and some 240 kilometres (150 mi) north-northwest of Manila. It is part of barangay Poro but administered by the Bases Conversion and Development Authority as a tourism and industrial estate.

== History ==
Poro Point has been the site of a navigational aid since 1885. The first Poro Point Lighthouse built during the Spanish colonial period is a cylindrical steel tower that was prefabricated in France and was completed on November 28, 1885. It measures approximately 6 metres (20 ft) in height and was one of the seventeen luces locales (local lights) built by the Spanish in the Philippines. On July 28, 1903, after the U.S. gained control of the Philippines from Spain, 200 meters of land surrounding the lighthouse was converted into a US reservation through Executive Order No. 06 signed by Civil Governor William H. Taft. By November 1903 through an executive order by U.S. President Theodore Roosevelt, the site became Camp Wallace and eventually, the Wallace Air Station.

In 1979, a concrete tower was built to replace the Spanish lighthouse. This structure that now towers over the area is 126 feet (38 m) tall. With the transfer of the U.S. facility to the Philippine government in September 1991, it became the headquarters of the Naval Forces Northern Luzon (NAVFORNOL) of the Philippine Navy called Poro Point Naval Station. It was later renamed to Naval Station Ernesto Ogbinar after the former Navy chief. The former Wallace Air Station has also been converted into a freeport and investment zone.

== Gallery ==
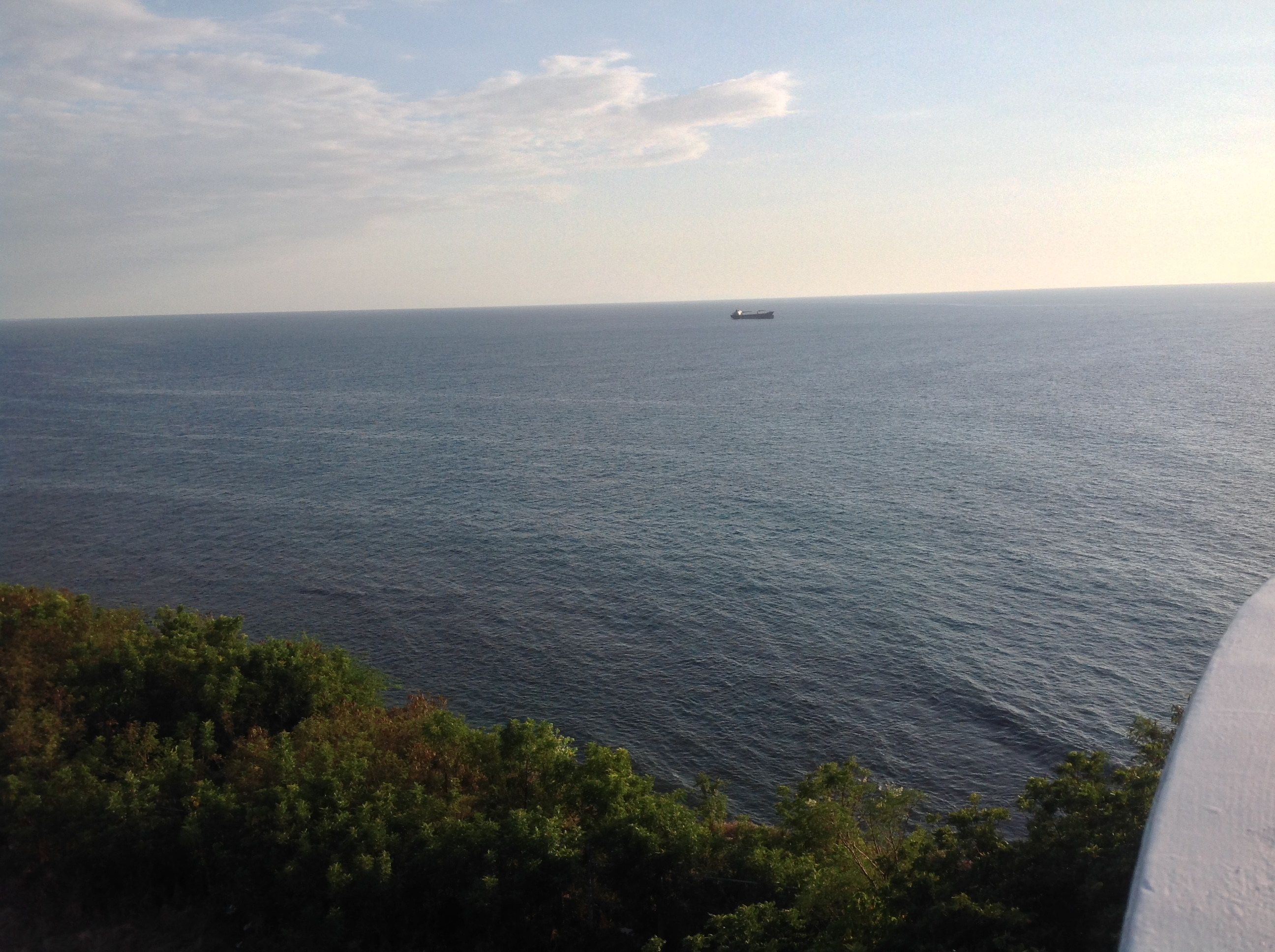
View atop the Poro Point Lighthouse

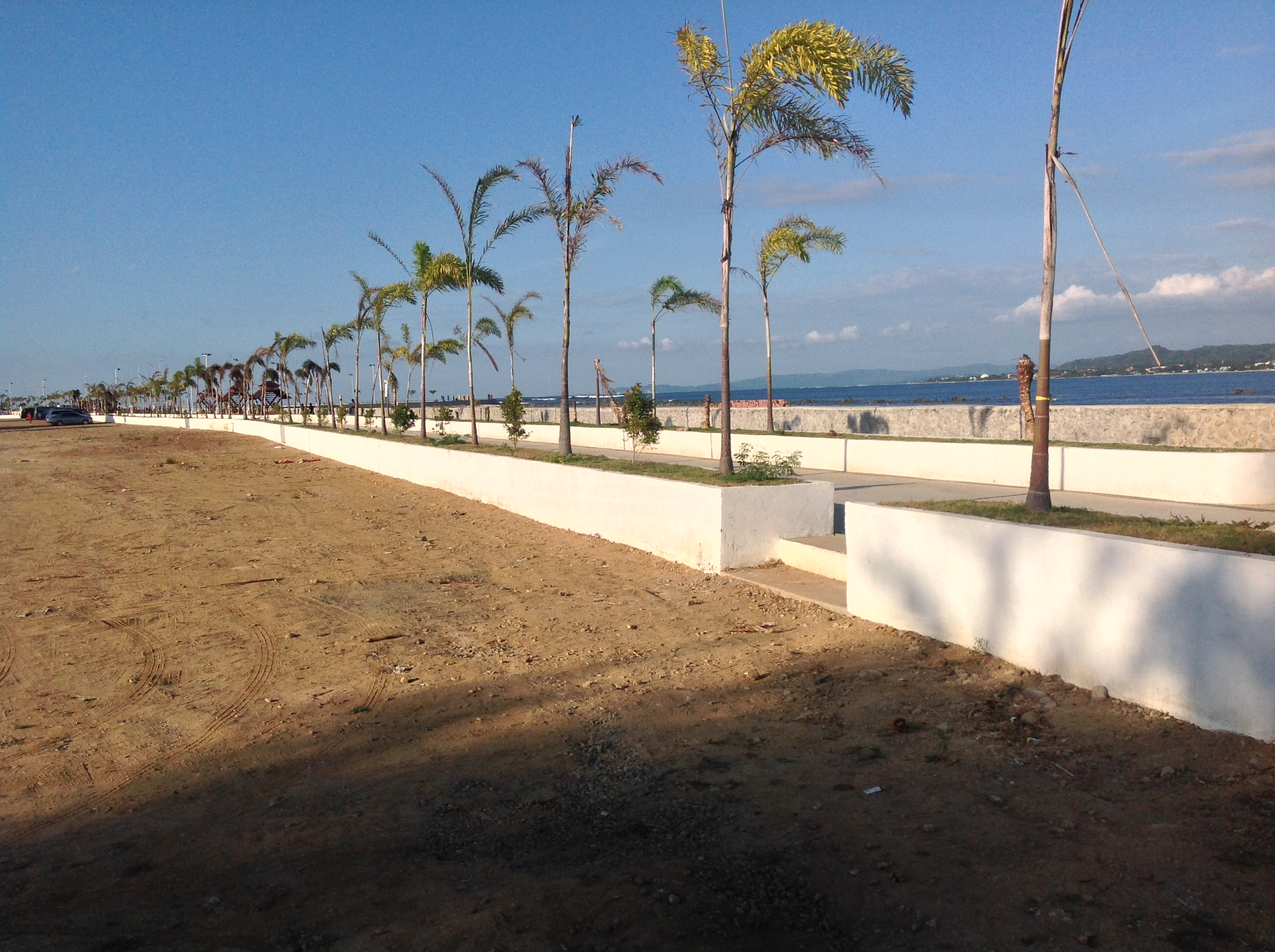
Poro Point Baywalk

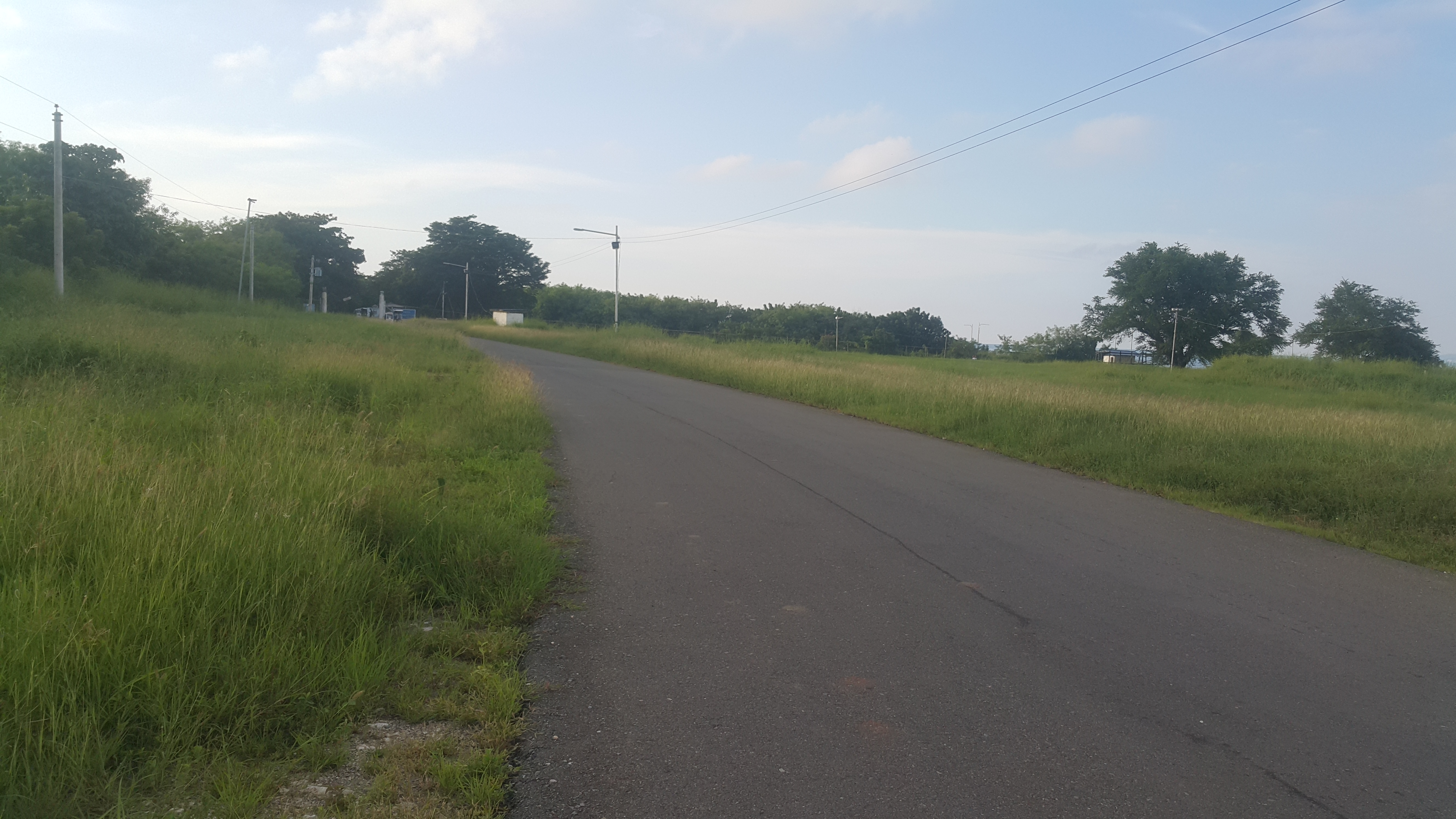
Baywalk

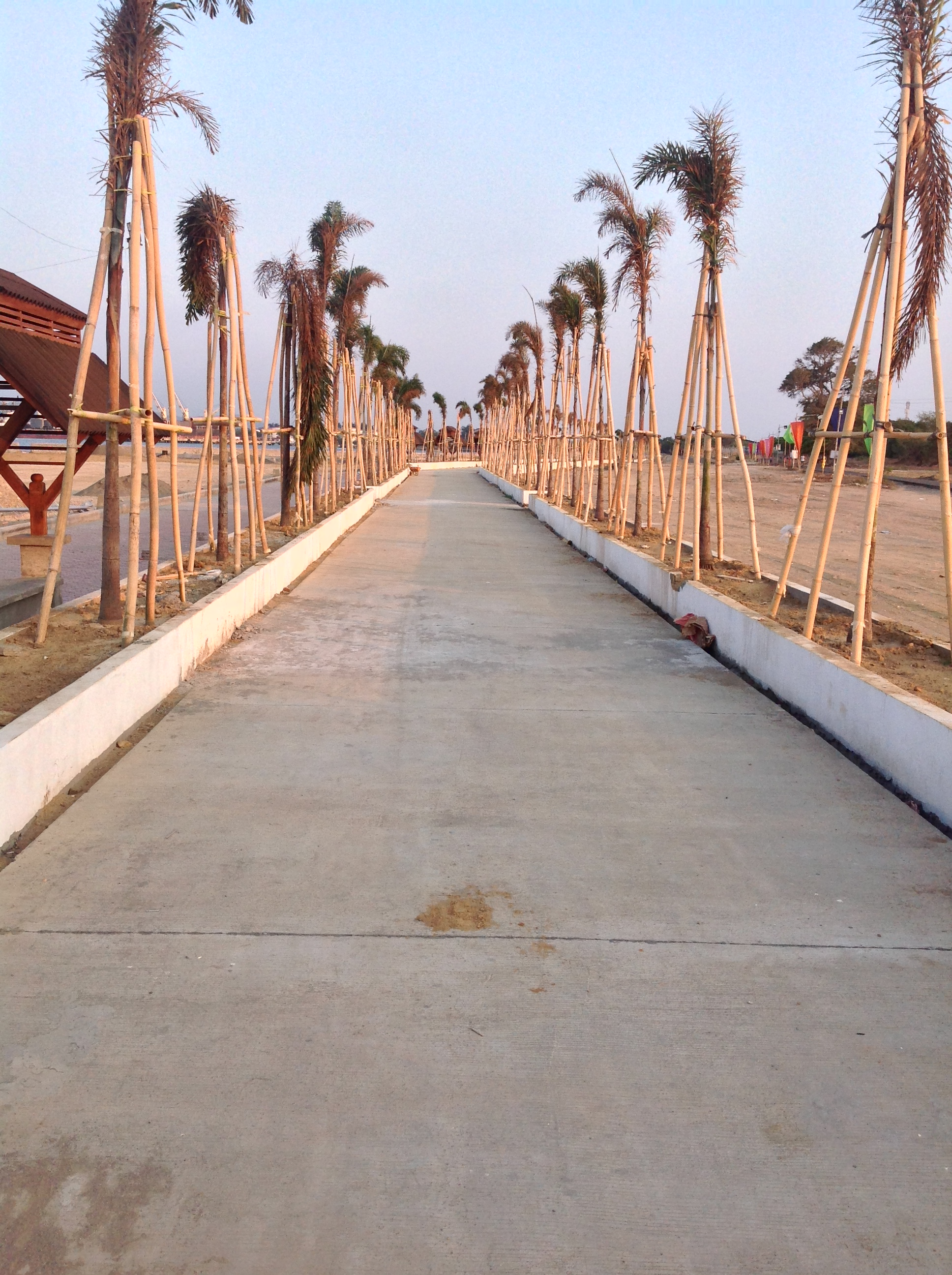
Baywalk

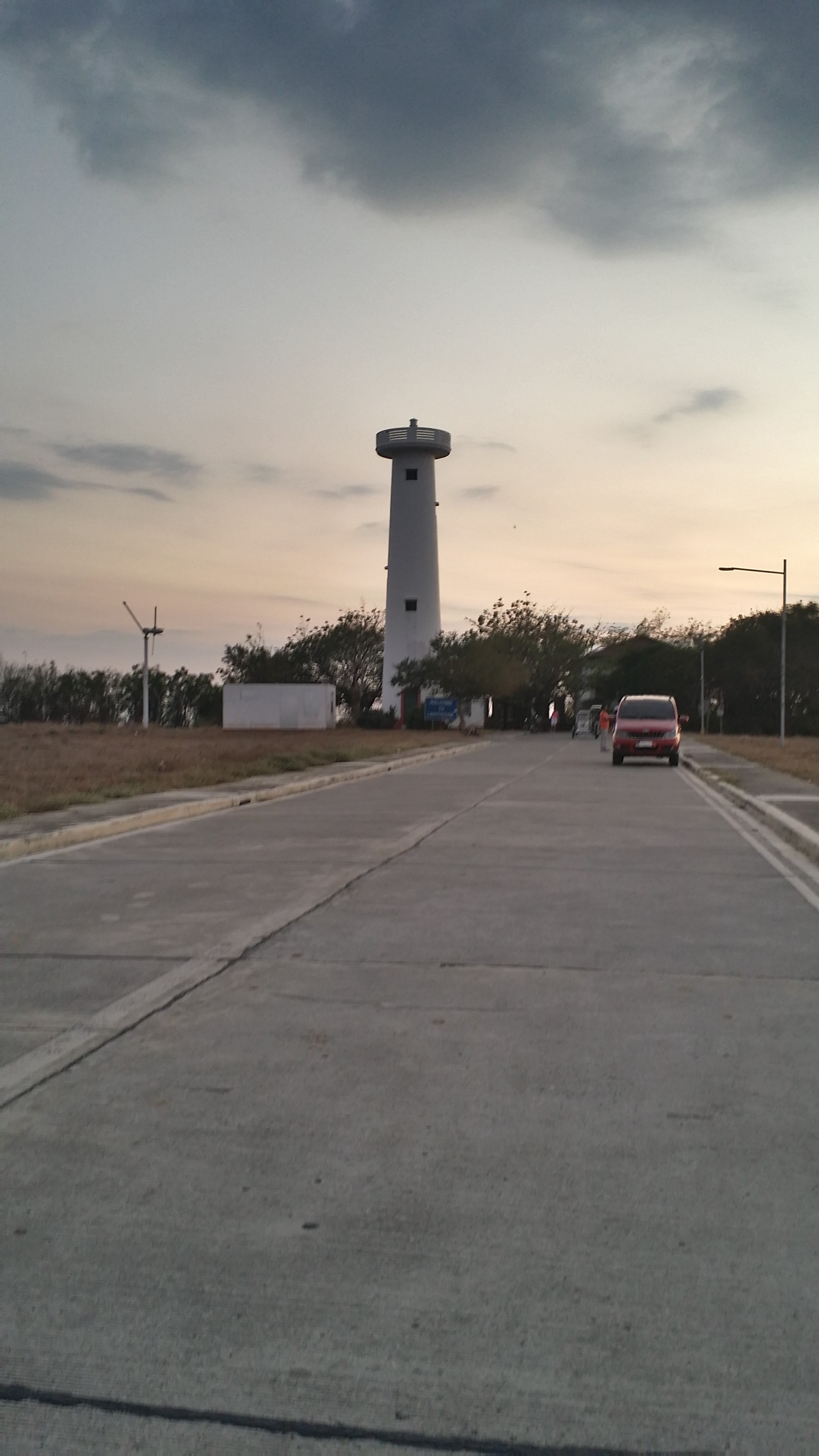
Poro Point Lighthouse
