= Camp John Hay =

Mixed-used development in Baguio, Philippines

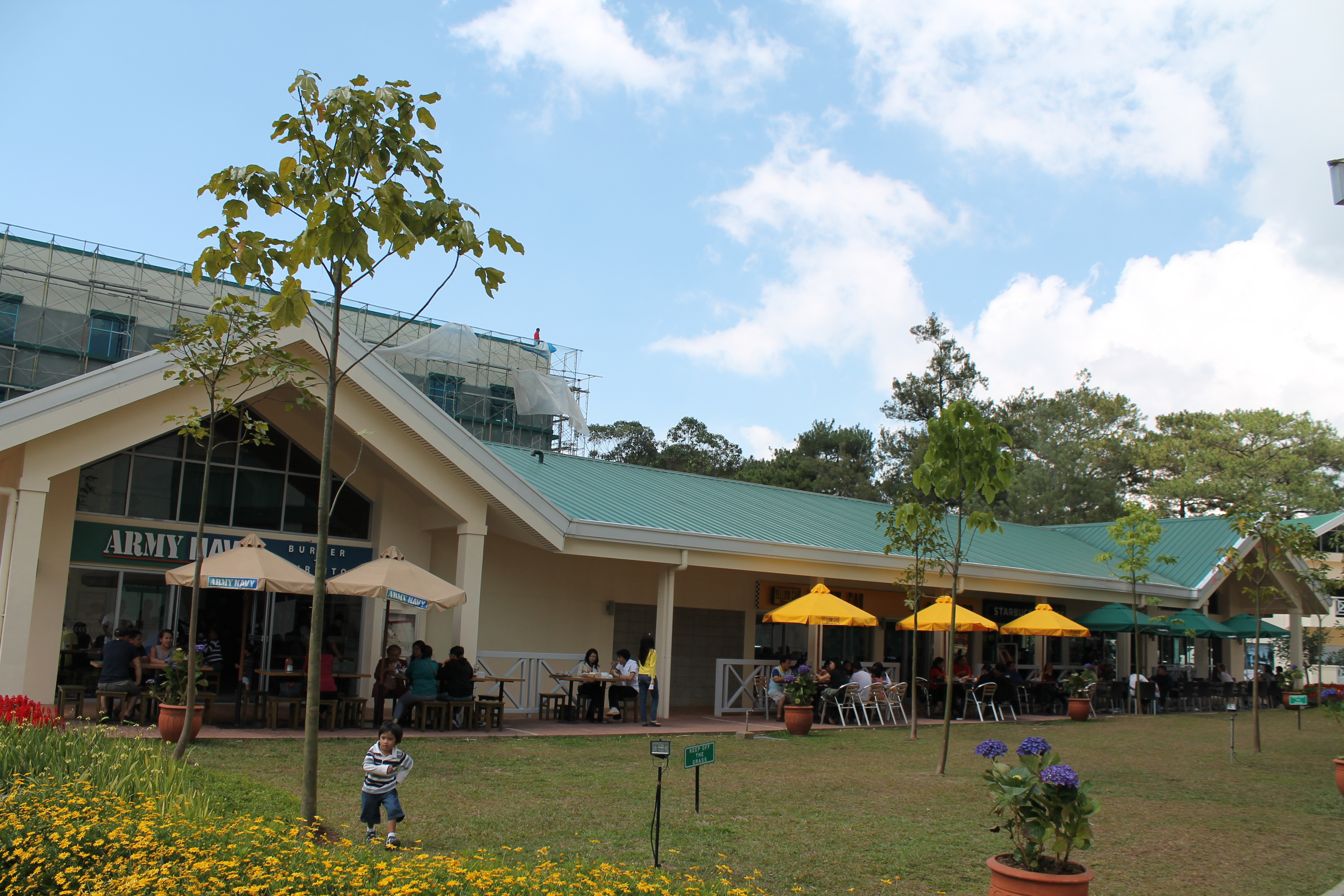

Project
- Developer: Camp John Hay Development Corp.
- Owner: Bases Conversion and Development Authority
- Website: campjohnhay.com; www.jhmc.com.ph

Physical features
- Major buildings: Bell House, Bell Amphitheater, Manor Hotel, Forest Lodge
- Public spaces: History Trail, Secret Garden, Cemetery of Negativism

Location
- Location within Philippines
- Coordinates: 16.398912°N 120.609463°E
- Country: Philippines
- Region: Cordillera Administrative Region
- City: Baguio

Camp John Hay is a mixed-used development which serves as a tourist destination and forest watershed reservation in Baguio, Philippines which was formerly a military base of the United States Armed Forces.

== History ==
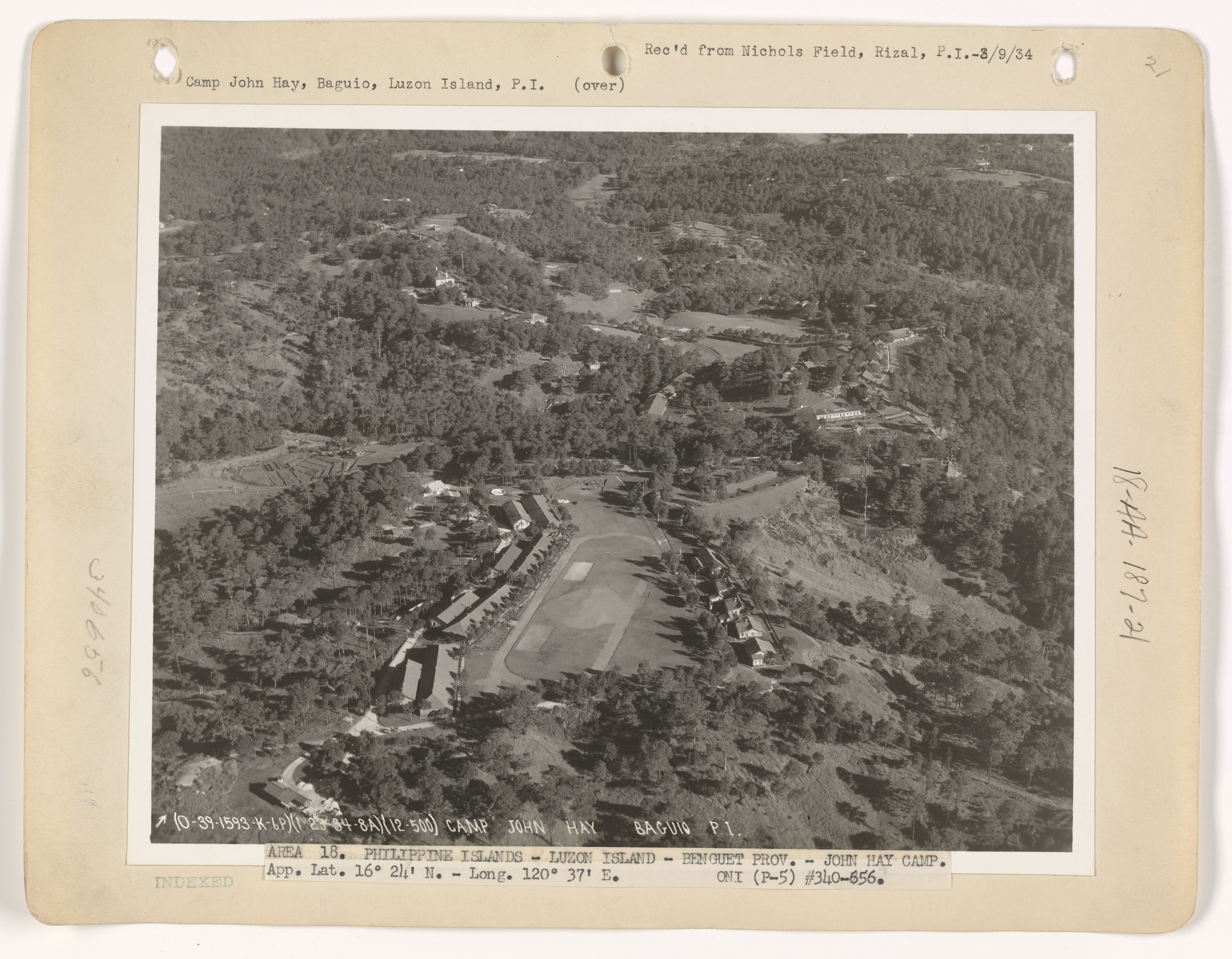
Aerial view of Camp John Hay, circa 1930s

=== Under United States management ===
The United States 48th Infantry Unit under Captain Robert Rudd established Hill Station in the current site of Camp John Hay in 1900 during the Philippine-American war. The site is referred to the locals, the Ibalois, as "Kafagway" and was owned at that time by Ibaloi leader Mateo Cariño. 213 hectares (530 acres) of the land was then designated as "Camp John Hay", a military reservation for American soldiers, in October 1903 when US President Theodore Roosevelt signed a presidential order. American military personnel were given a place to refuge from the relative hotter temperature of the lowlands.

The 15th Infantry Regiment had a small detachment at Camp John Hay in the 1910s prior to the Great War. The field staff and the bulk of the regiment were near Tientsin, China during this time.

==== World War II ====
In December 1941, Japanese warplanes dropped 72 bombs over the main gate of the camp during the onset of World War II in the Philippines. Camp John Hay served as an internment camp of the Imperial Japanese forces as well as the headquarters of General Tomoyuki Yamashita during the Japanese occupation period. When the Japanese forces in the archipelago capitulated, Yamashita surrendered to the Allied forces at Camp John Hay, specifically at the High Commissioner's residence which was later renamed as the Ambassador's Residence.

==== Post war and independence ====
After the war, Camp John Hay was converted into John Hay Air Base in 1955 and remained under the control of the Americans.

On December 13, 1966 a fourth of Camp John Hay was given to the Philippine government and was made a forest reserve and watershed. The nominal air base has no airstrip and has a golf course. It served as a recreational venue for both Americans and Filipino politicians and businessmen.

=== Under the Philippine government and redevelopment ===
The Camp was officially turned over to the Philippine government on July 1, 1991 with Tourism Secretary Rafael Alunan III in attendance. The plan was to convert Camp John Hay into a resort. In 1995, the Baguio City Council endorsed a potential commercialization of Camp John Hay setting conditions for its support of a master plan for the former American installation.

In 1996, the Bases Conversion and Development Authority entered into a deal with Camp John Hay Development Corp. (CJHDevco) of Robert Sobrepeña to convert the Camp into a commercial development. Among the first additions was the 187-unit, four-storey Manor Hotel which had a soft opening on December 1, 2001.

In 2015, the Philippine Dispute Resolution Center nullified the 1996 lease between BCDA and CJHDevCo due to mutual breaches and ordered the latter to return control of the complex and its facilities to the BCDA. Following protracted appeals, the decision was upheld by the Supreme Court in April 2024, with the BCDA reassuming the property in January 2025.

== Features ==
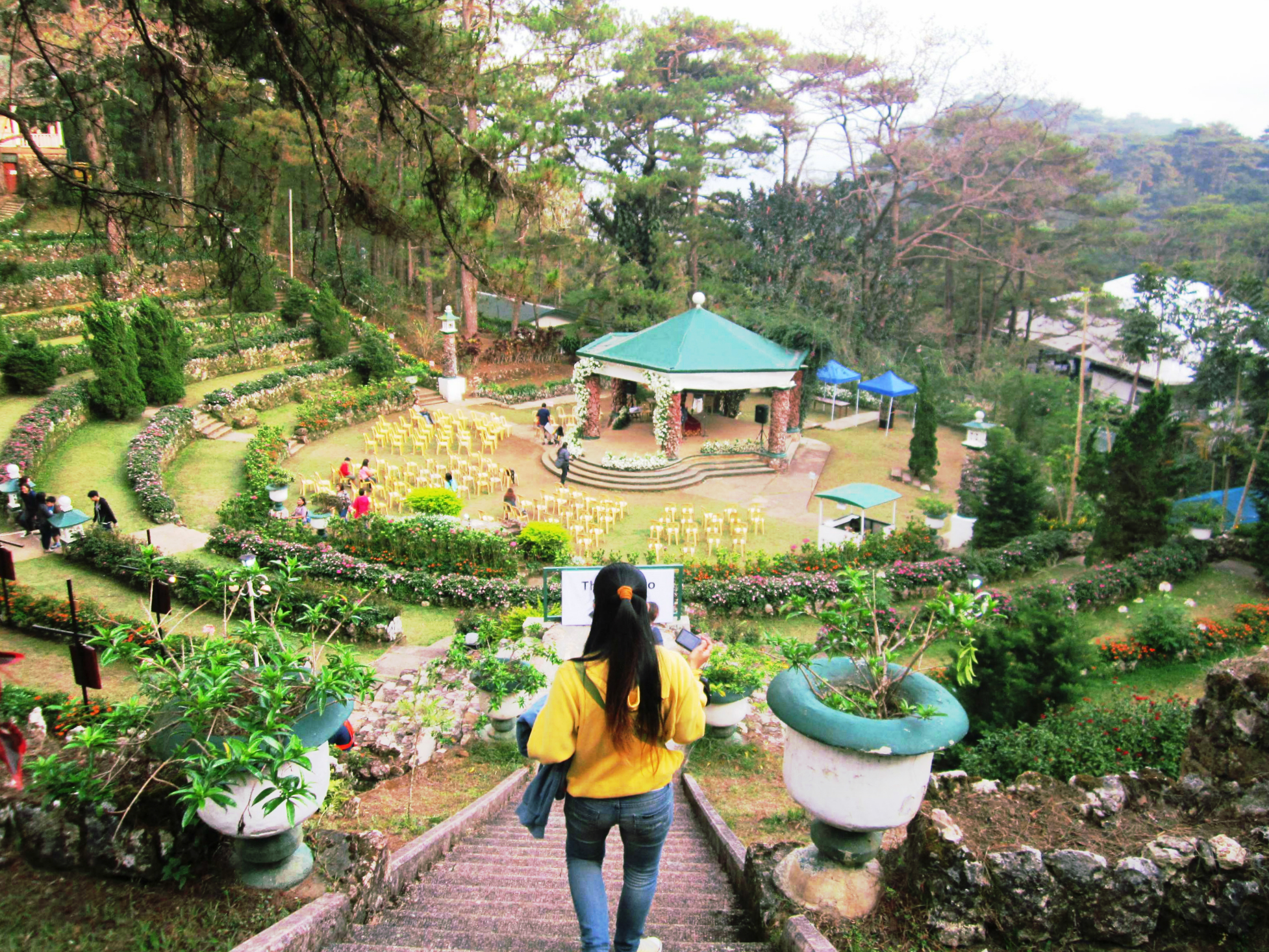
Bell Amphitheater

=== Historic buildings and structures ===
The Bell House, a historic structure named after Major General Franklin Bell is situated at the camp's Historical Core. Besides the house is the Bell Amphitheater which was designed by Bell himself.

=== Gardens ===
Camp John Hay's history is featured through markers installed at the History Trail and Secret Garden. The Cemetery of Negativism nearby or the Lost Cemetery is a small area within Camp John Hay. The "cemetery" was established by then-commanding general of the John Hay Air Station, John Hightower in the early 1980s. It serves a symbolic burial site for negativism. The Amphiteather near Bell House also hosts a gazebo which is encircled by a multi-terraced flower garden.

=== Golf course ===
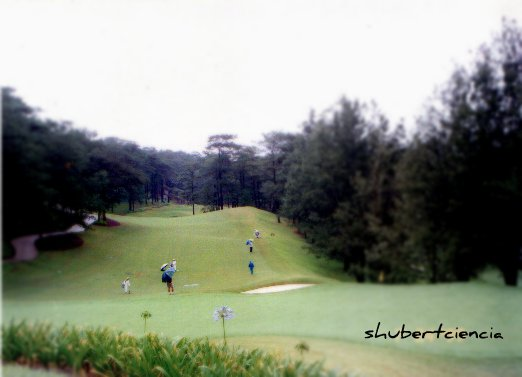
Golf course

The Camp John Hay Golf Club is situated within the area. In January 2025, the Bases Conversion and Development Authority took over the course.

=== Others ===
John Hay Hotel and Forest Lodge are the two hotels operated by the management of Camp John Hay and are situated within the area. The Manor Hotel is a four-star hotel as per the Department of Tourism's National Accommodation Standards as of December 2024. In March 2026, plans to construct the John Hay Sports Center was announced.

== See also ==
- United States bases in the Philippines
