= Icone Tower =

- Interactive map of the Icone Tower area
- Alternative names: BCDA Iconic Building

General information
- Status: Approved
- Location: Bonifacio Global City, Taguig, Metro Manila, Philippines
- Coordinates: 14°33′19″N 121°03′15.2″E
- Owner: Bases Conversion and Development Authority

Height
- Height: 388 m (1,273 ft)

Technical details
- Floor count: 36
- Grounds: 7,275 m^{2} (78,310 sq ft)

Design and construction
- Architecture firm: Henning Larsen Architects
- Structural engineer: BuroHappold Engineering
- Other designers: SLA (landscaping)

The Icone Tower (stylized as ICONE Tower), also known as the BCDA Iconic Building, is a proposed skyscraper at the Bonifacio Global City in Taguig, Metro Manila, Philippines.

== History ==
=== Development ===
In 2017, the Bases Conversion and Development Authority (BCDA) held the "BCDA Iconic Building Design Contest" a design competition open for both Philippine-based and foreign architecture firms. The competition was for a design for the BCDA's corporate office to be built at the Bonifacio Global City. Interested firms pitched their relevant experience and credentials to the BCDA which made a shortlist of five qualified firms. The shortlisted firms for the competition were NSI+Caza, Henning Larsen Architects, DP Architects Pte Ltd, JDS Architects SPRL, and J.Mayer.H And Partner + Collaborative Architecture. Only NSI+Caza is based in the Philippines. It was only at this stage that the BCDA tasked firms to come up with designs for the building.

Henning Larsen Architects's design was selected as the winner of the competition and they signed a joint venture contract with the BCDA to implement the design by February 2018. The tower was projected to be completed by 2021.

== Architecture and design ==
=== Designers ===
The Hong Kong office of the Danish firm, Henning Larsens Architects led by Design Director Claude Bøjer Godefroy and Managing Director Elva Tang will be responsible for the architecture and design of the Icone Tower. They were the winners of a design competition by the BCDA. The architecture firm collaborated with BuroHappold Engineering and landscape architects SLA for the winning design.

=== Concept ===
The design competition held by the Bases Conversion and Development Authority was for an office building standing on an area of 7,275 square meters (78,310 sq ft). The BCDA required the design to be representative of the Bonifacio Global City and of "Filipino ideals". The tower's design is meant as a tribute to the Armed Forces of the Philippines the largest stakeholders of the BCDA.

Its design was inspired from Filipino culture. The Icone Tower's shape was derived from the form of the Mayon Volcano. The Bahay kubo as explored by Francisco Mañosa to be a pyramidal form dividable in three layers (silong, bulwagan, and bubong; lit. 'basement, hall, and roof') also served as a basis for the design. The bottom portion of tower is devoted to a public plaza which will be planted with tall trees with tropical Filipino forests as the inspiration for the landscaping direction. the middle portion will be allocated to office space while the top portion, dubbed as the Light of Manila will be public observatory and will project a beam of light, acting as a lighthouse.

=== Technical details ===
The Icone Tower has an elliptical cone shape reducing the cost to make the building resistant to earthquakes and typhoons. Its "almost Gothic" facade or exoskeleton is supported by arches. Its office space is meant to be illuminated by natural light. It will also host social spaces, terraces, and atriums.

The building was originally proposed to stand 308 meters (1,010 ft) tall but its height was later revised to 275 meters (902 ft). The tower will have 36 floors.
