= San Fernando Airport (Philippines) =

San Fernando Airport Pagtayaban ti San Fernando Paliparan ng San Fernando
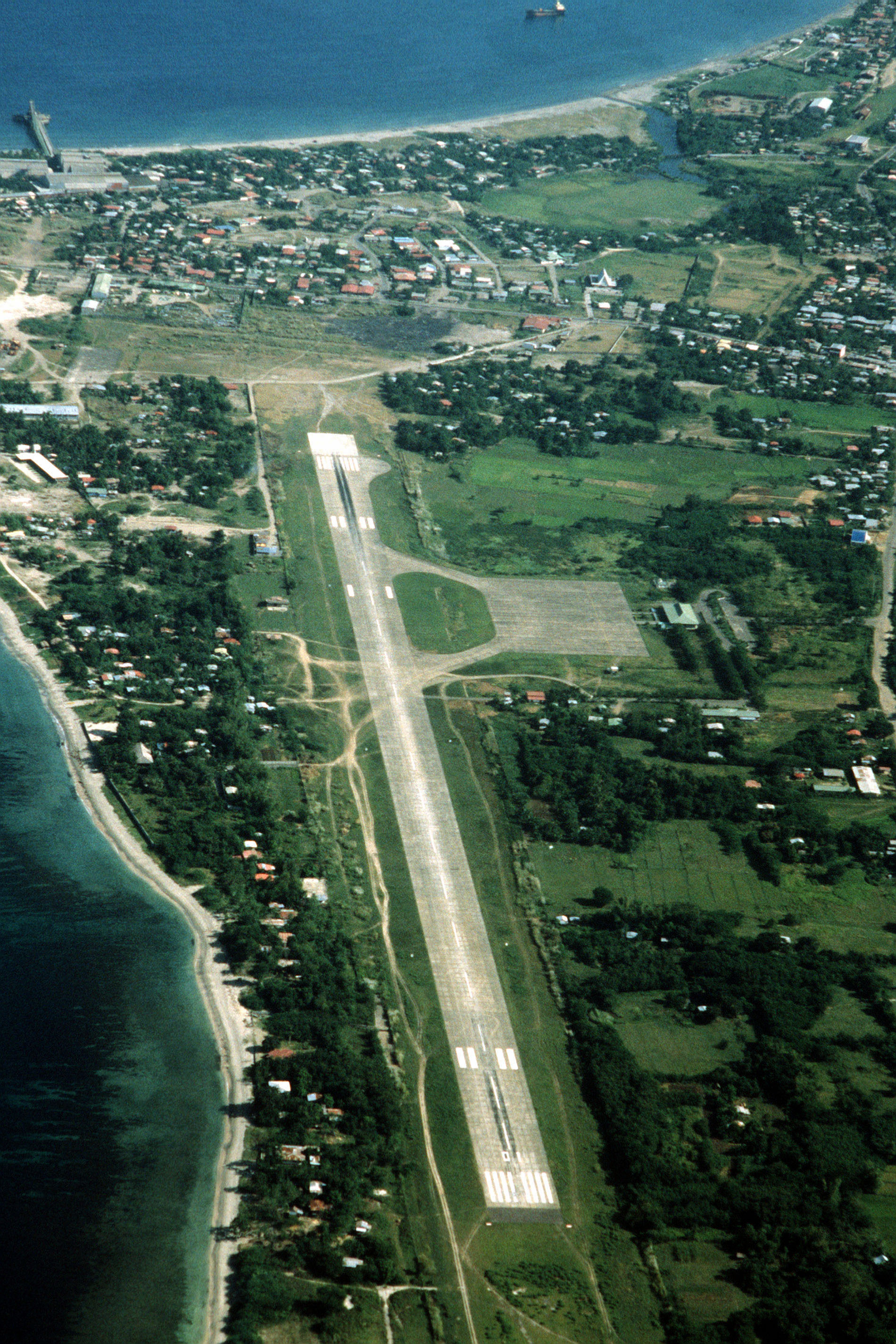
- IATA: SFE; ICAO: RPUS

Summary
- Airport type: Public
- Operator: Civil Aviation Authority of the Philippines
- Serves: San Fernando, La Union
- Location: Poro, San Fernando, La Union
- Elevation AMSL: 4 m / 13 ft
- Coordinates: 16°35′44.12″N 120°18′11.59″E
- Interactive map of San Fernando Airport

Runways
Direction	Length		Surface
Direction	m	ft	Surface
01/19	2,120	6,955	Concrete

San Fernando Airport (Ilocano: Pagtayaban ti San Fernando; Filipino: Paliparan ng San Fernando; IATA: SFE, ICAO: RPUS) is an airport serving the general area of San Fernando, located in the province of La Union in the Philippines. The airport is classified as a community airport by the Civil Aviation Authority of the Philippines, a body of the Department of Transportation that is responsible for the operations of not only this airport but also of all other airports in the Philippines except the major international airports.

It was extensively used as a landing strip by American forces when Wallace Air Station was still in operation.

No airlines currently serve the airport.
