= Bases Conversion and Development Authority =

State-owned enterprise in the Philippines

Agency overview
- Formed: April 3, 1992; 34 years ago
- Headquarters: 9th floor, One West Building, Clark Global City, Clark Freeport Zone, Mabalacat, Pampanga, Philippines
- Agency executives: Hilario Bringas Paredes, Chairman; Ariel F. Nepomuceno, President and CEO
- Parent agency: Office of the President of the Philippines
- Child agencies: Clark Freeport and Special Economic Zone; John Hay Management Corporation; Poro Point Management Corporation
- Website: www.bcda.gov.ph

The Bases Conversion and Development Authority (BCDA; Filipino: Pangasiwaan sa Pangkaunlarang Kumbersiyon ng mga Base) is a government-owned and controlled corporation under the Office of the President of the Philippines. It is a government instrumentality vested with corporate powers under Republic Act No. 7227 (Bases Conversion and Development Act of 1992), signed into law by President Corazon Aquino on March 13, 1992. The BCDA Charter was amended by Republic Act No. 7917 in 1995, and further amended by Republic Act No. 9400 in 2007. The corporation is mandated to transform former US military bases into alternative productive civilian use.

== History ==
The Bases Conversion and Development Authority (BCDA) is a development corporation vested with corporate powers under Republic Act (RA) 7227 (Bases Conversion and Development Act of 1992), signed into law by former President Corazon C. Aquino on March 13, 1992. The BCDA Charter was amended by RA 7917 in 1995, and further amended by RA 9400 in 2007.

=== Aeta communities ===
Phase one of New Clark City, where the Philippine government built a sports complex worth ₱9.5 billion for the SEA Games, covers 9,450 hectares of land and displaced more than 27,500 Aetas. Some families were given a week to vacate their homes in 2019 before the start of the SEA Games. In 2019, the BCDA, citing the absence of a Certificate of Ancestral Domain Title, ordered the eviction of over 500 Aeta families for the expansion of New Clark City. The BCDA offered Aeta families $0.51 (₱30) per square meters as financial compensation for their eviction. The Asosyason ng Katutubong Mahawang in Capas said that the Aeta people have resided in the ancestral domain even before the Spanish colonization of the Philippines.

== Organization and function ==
BCDA engages in public-private partnerships to push forward public infrastructure such as tollways, airports, seaports, and major real estate developments. It is one of the key agencies driving "Build Build Build", the Philippine government's infrastructure plan. This infrastructure plan is intended to reduce congestion, create jobs and alleviate costs in the Philippines.

During the first two years of the present administration under Philippine President Rodrigo Duterte, BCDA has contributed P8.2 billion to the modernization program of the Armed Forces of the Philippines (AFP), BCDA's major stakeholder. The amount represents 20 percent of the total P40 billion received members of the AFP from BCDA since the state-run agency was created in 1992. For the past 25 years, BCDA has already disposed a total of Php90.32 billion worth of assets. Since 1992, BCDA has generated Php57.215 billion in disposition proceeds from the sale, lease and/or joint venture development of former Metro Manila camps and their transformation into new premier mix-use economic districts. The biggest two are Fort Bonifacio and Villamor Air Base, which are now known as Bonifacio Global City and Newport City, respectively.

The biggest stakeholder of the BCDA is the Armed Forces of the Philippines (AFP). Of the Php57.215 billion generated through BCDA's Asset Disposition Program (ADP), 38.08% or P21.788 billion has been remitted to the National Treasury for the account of the AFP. This is broken down into Php12.292 billion for the AFP modernization program and Php9.496 billion for military replication expenses. As mandated by R.A.7227 and amended by R.A. 7917, other beneficiaries are the contiguous municipalities of Taguig, Pateros and Makati, and 14 other government beneficiary agencies, receiving shares amounting to Php462 million and Php7.272 billion, respectively. On the other hand, some Php619 million went to the replication of non-military facilities affected by the developments, Php4.373 billion for taxes, duties and fees and Php7.190 to direct expenses like construction of site development projects, relocation and housing of informal occupants, survey, appraisal and titling expenses, as well as administrative costs. Further, Php10.891 billion went to the bases conversion program, the other major mandate under RA7227.

After BCDA remits the money to the Bureau of Treasury, the utilization and distribution of the remittances become the responsibilities of the Department of Budget and Management in accordance with the approved fiscal program of the government and shall release the share of the beneficiary agencies pursuant to the budget execution guidelines.

=== Legal issues ===
In October 2024, the Supreme Court upheld with finality its April 3 arbitration award decision in favor of BCDA, which nullified the Camp John Hay development lease and ordered CJHDevco's eviction.

== Properties ==
The following sites are currently owned and maintained by the BCDA Group:

- Bataan Technology Park in Morong, Bataan (formerly the Philippine Refugee Processing Center) (365 ha)
- New Clark City in Tarlac (9,450 ha)
- Clark Freeport Zone, Pampanga (2,033 ha)
- Camp John Hay Special Economic Zone (625 ha)
- Poro Point Freeport Zone (236 ha)
- Subic Bay Freeport Zone (13,599 ha)
- Bonifacio Global City and Villamor Airbase (900 ha)

== Projects ==
The BCDA is the builder of the Subic–Clark–Tarlac Expressway, a four-lane tollway. It also constructed and manages Clark International Airport. The corporation would have undertaken the development of the Northrail project but it was cancelled in 2011.

== See also ==
- Metropolitan Manila Development Authority
- Icone Tower
- Philippines–United States Visiting Forces Agreement
