= Naval Station Ernesto Ogbinar =

Military station in La Union, Philippines

Coordinates: 16°37′14″N 120°16′50″E

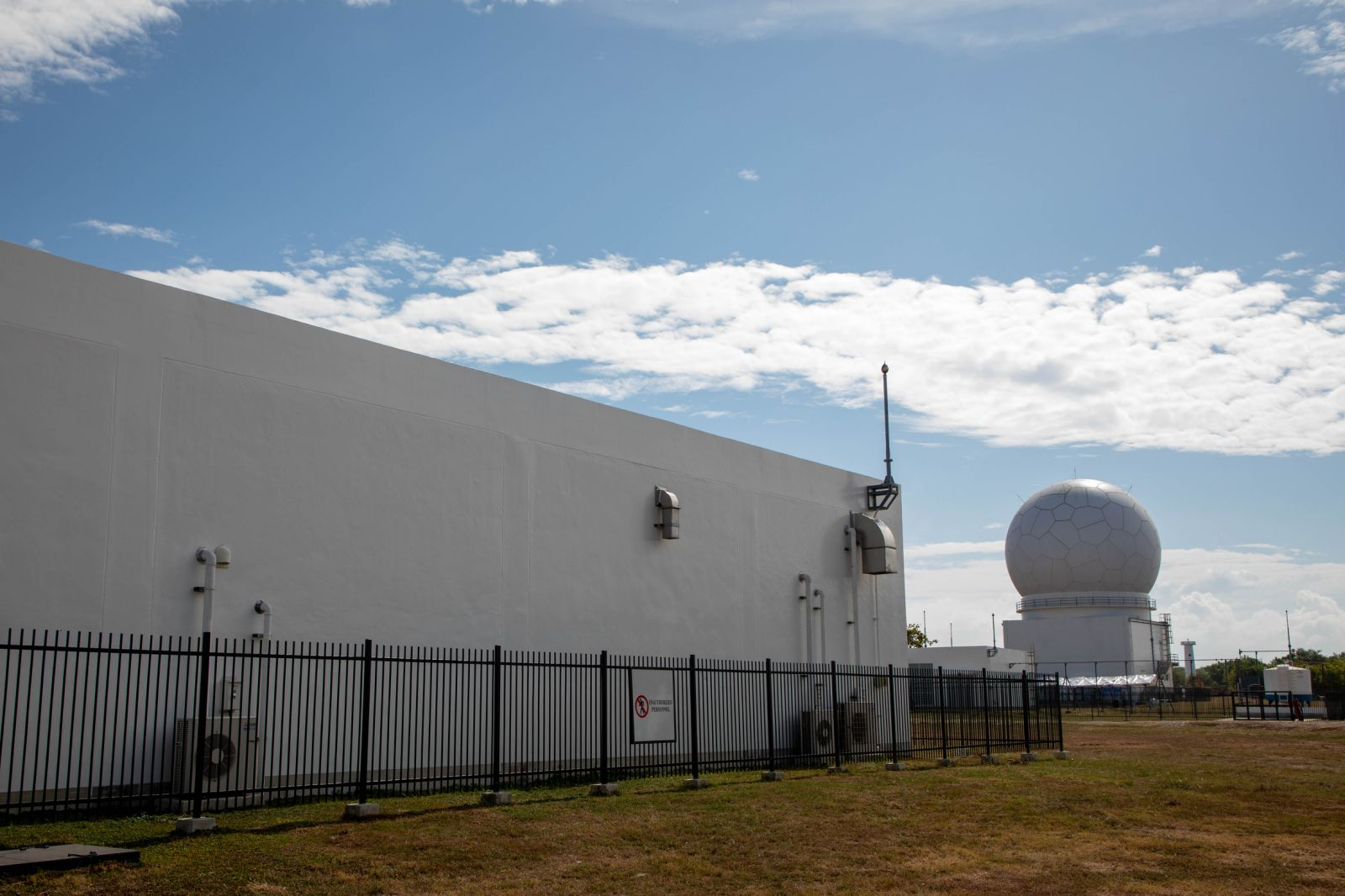
The Philippine Air Force unveiled its new Air Surveillance Radar System (ASRS) during an Acceptance, Turnover, and Blessing Ceremony at Wallace Air Station in San Fernando City, La Union on Wednesday, December 20, 2023.

Naval Station Ernesto Ogbinar, previously Naval Station Poro Point, is an installation of the Philippine Navy and Philippine Airforce, located at Poro Point, in San Fernando, La Union, Philippines. It was previously a U.S. installation known as Wallace Air Station; transfer of ownership took place in 1991.

The Poro Point installation occupied 101 hectares and was acquired in 1903 for the United States Cavalry. Originally, Camp Wallace, the facility was named in honor of Second Lieutenant George W. Wallace, a Medal of Honor recipient from the U.S. 9th Infantry Regiment for actions on March 4, 1900, in the Philippines. In November 1903, President Theodore Roosevelt signed an executive order establishing Camp Wallace and Camp John Hay in Baguio.

== 848th Aircraft Control and Warning Squadron ==
The land was later transferred to the United States Air Force and it was last home to the 848th Air Defense Squadron (ADS), which provided logistics and administrative support to other radar detachments. The 848th ADS was originally the 848th Aircraft Control and Warning Squadron which provided logistics and administrative support to other radar detachments under its chain of command. It was redesignated as the 848th Air Defense Squadron on November 22, 1989. Wallace Air Station and the squadron were inactivated in 1991 following the closing or transfer of all United States Department of Defense facilities in the Philippines.

== Drone launch site ==
Wallace was also home to a Ryan Firebee Drone Launch Facility, run by an Air Force contractor. This facility and the associated 1st Test Squadron "COMBAT SAGE" program provided Pacific Air Forces pilots with live-fire training. Since the drones were not usually destroyed when they were shot down, there was a need to recover them for reuse. Hence, HH-3E helicopters manned by Air Force Parajumpers from the 31st Aerospace Rescue & Recovery Squadron based at nearby Clark Air Base and a drone recovery boat (1604) with its home port in the local harbor at nearby San Fernando were always on hand to recover the drones.

During each launch, numerous "banca boats" (outrigger bamboo canoes), were close by and always in the chase to recover the JATO bottle dropped by a drone after takeoff. They are worth a few pesos paid by the contractor.

== Other operations ==
Wallace Air Station was also home to a number of fuel storage facilities, and was able to provide fuel for the occasional helicopter, usually a few CH-3s from Clark Air Base, or an occasional United States Navy helicopter from the Subic Bay Naval Base. UH-1 helicopters from the Philippine Air Force would also show up, but not too often, since there was not enough budget for operating them. For larger aircraft such as C-12s or C-130s, the USAF would always use the San Fernando Airport.

Wallace is also home to Voice of America broadcast equipment, as well as various Philippine Air Force antennas.

== Transfer to the Philippine Navy and Philippine Airforce ==
The facility was formally turned-over by the United States to the Republic of the Philippines on September 16, 1991. It became the headquarters of the Naval Forces Northern Luzon (NAVFORNOL) of the Philippine Navy called Poro Point Naval Station. It was later renamed to Naval Station Ernesto Ogbinar after the former Navy chief.

In November 2014, Commander Severino David took over the Navy's Northern Luzon Command based at Poro Point. David replaced Commander Nodolfo Tejada who retired after serving for 37 years.

On December 20, 2023, a newly constructed radar facility was inaugurated at the station. The radar facility featured the first FPS-3ME air surveillance radar delivered by the Mitsubishi Electric Corporation to the Philippine Air Force under a deal signed in 2020.

The base was severely damaged from Typhoon Co-may (Emong) in July 2025.
