= Cordillera Administrative Region =

Administrative region of the Philippines

Cordillera
- Region
- Cordillera Administrative Region
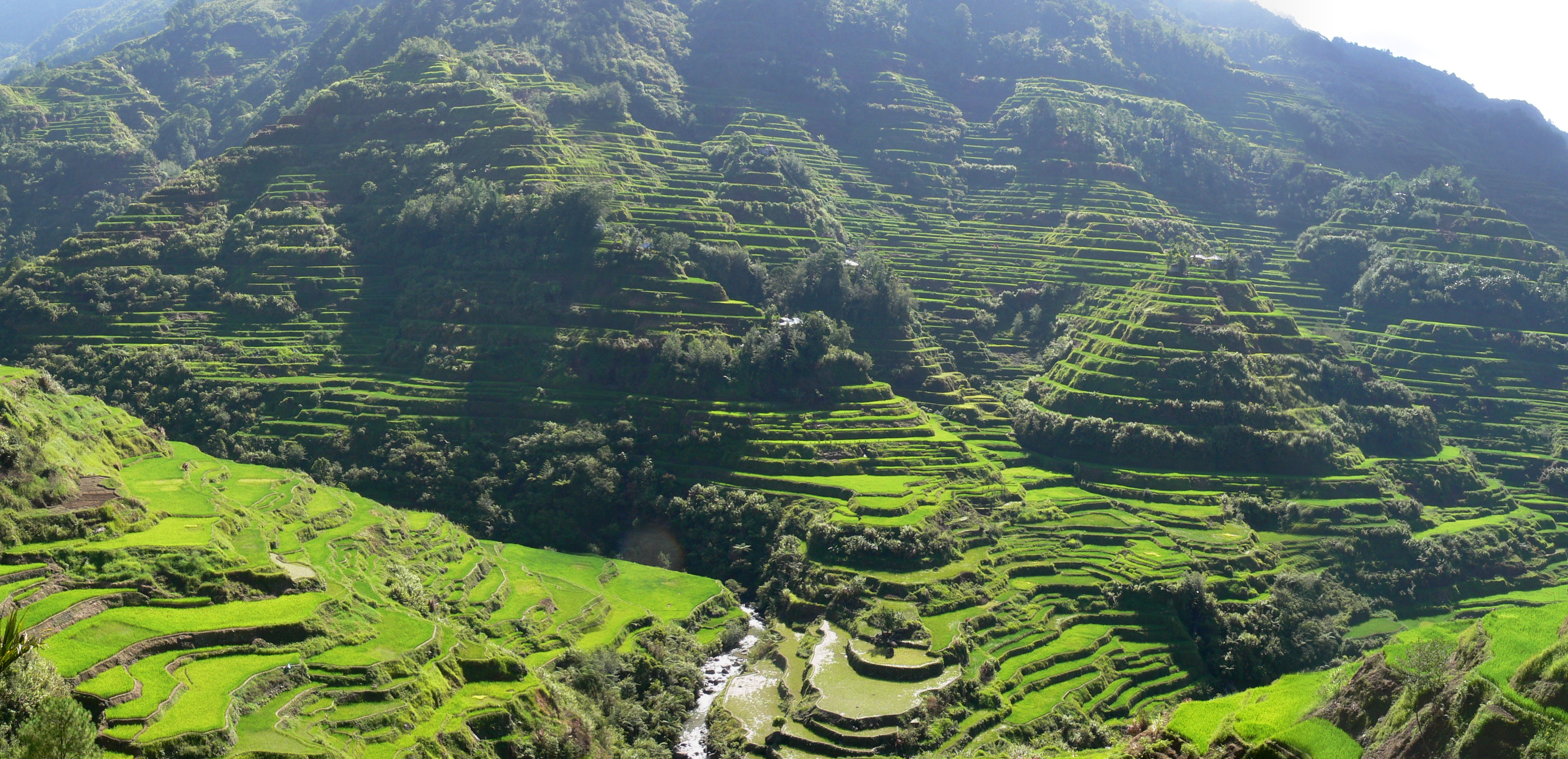
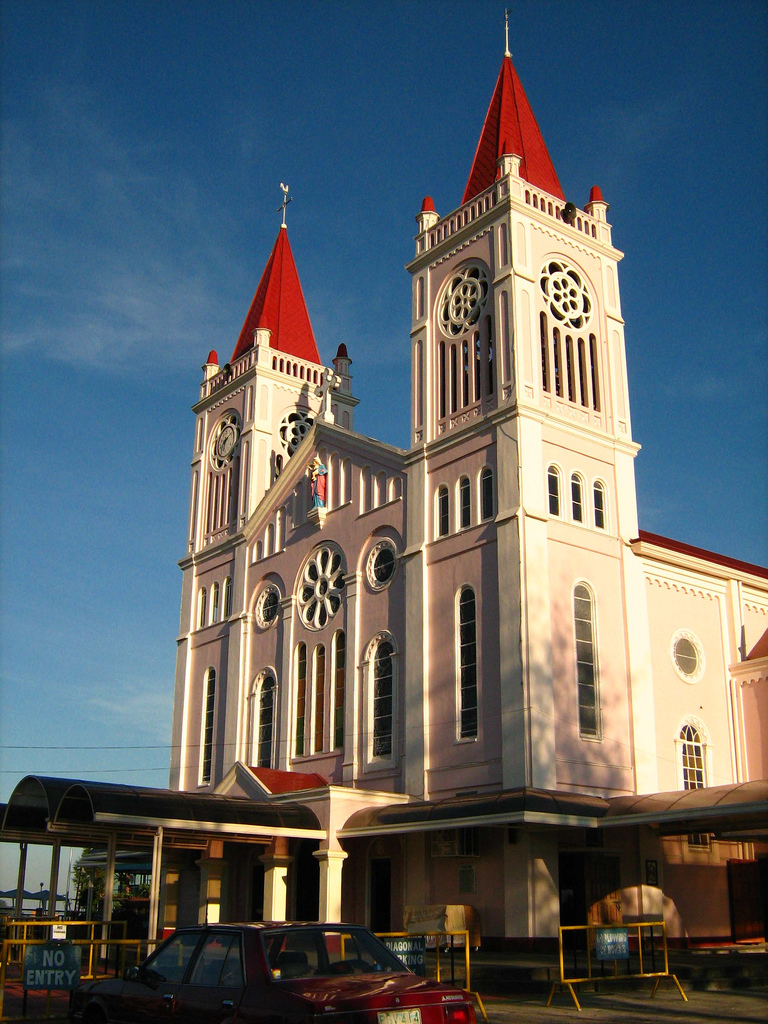
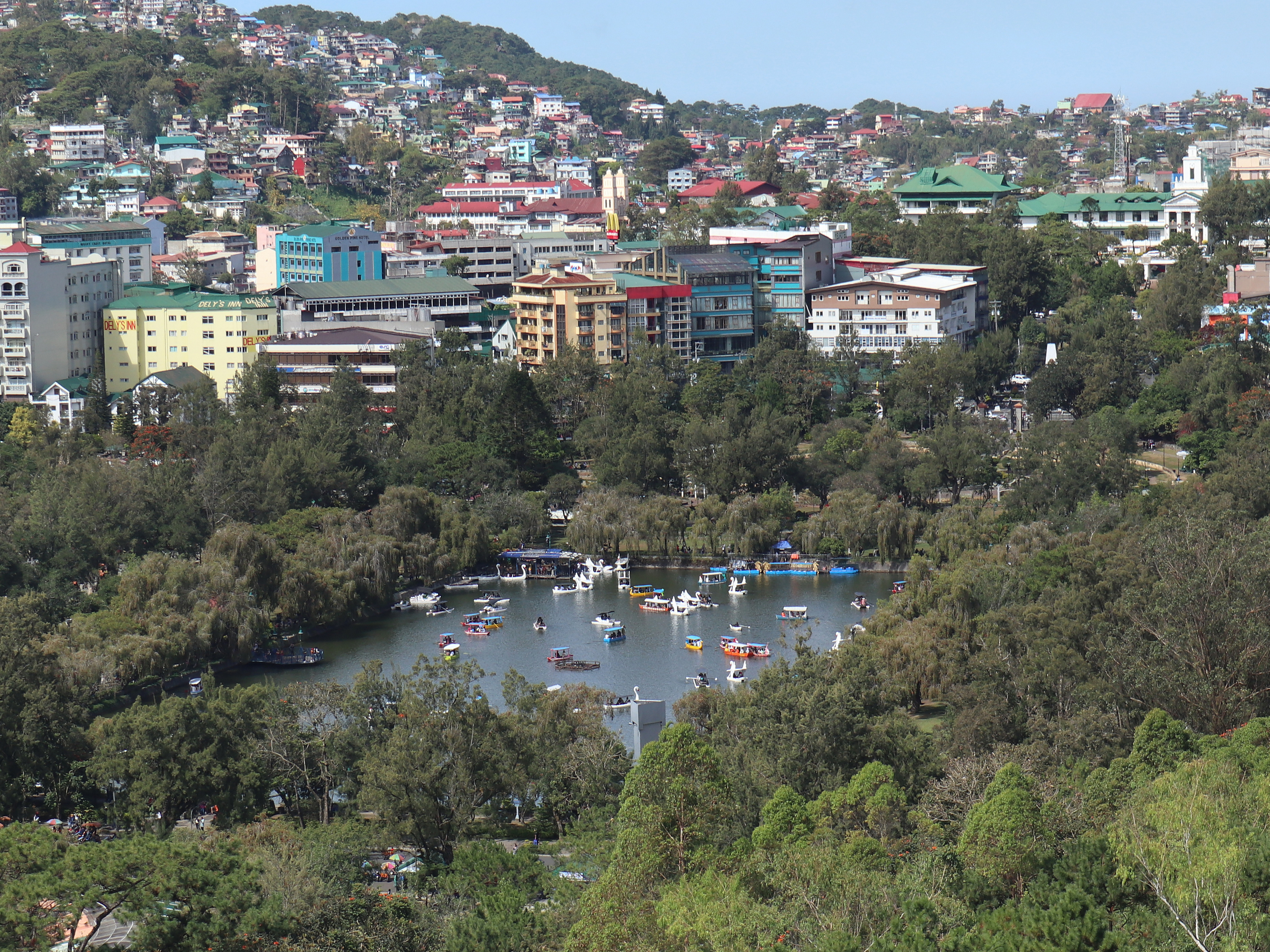
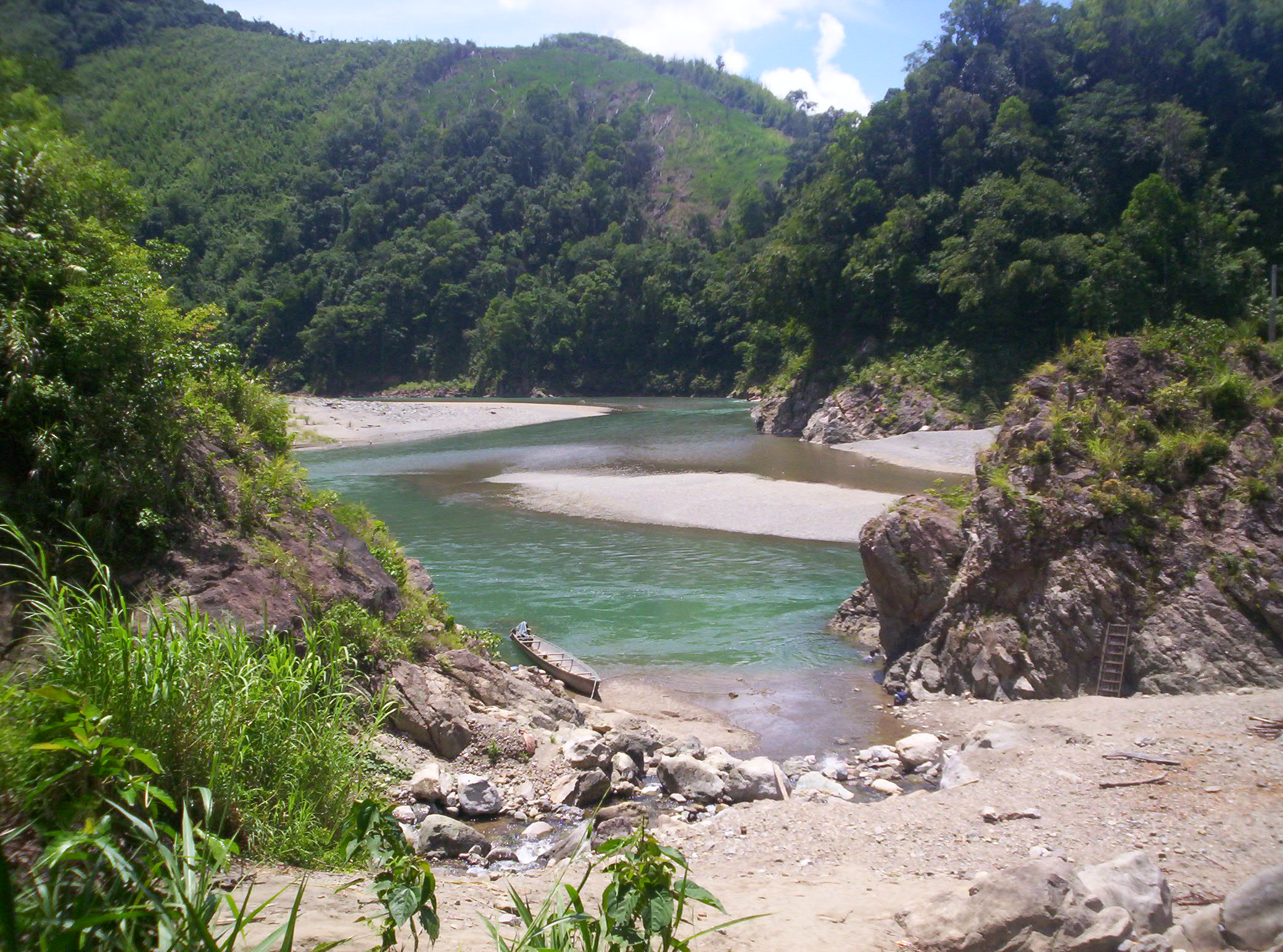
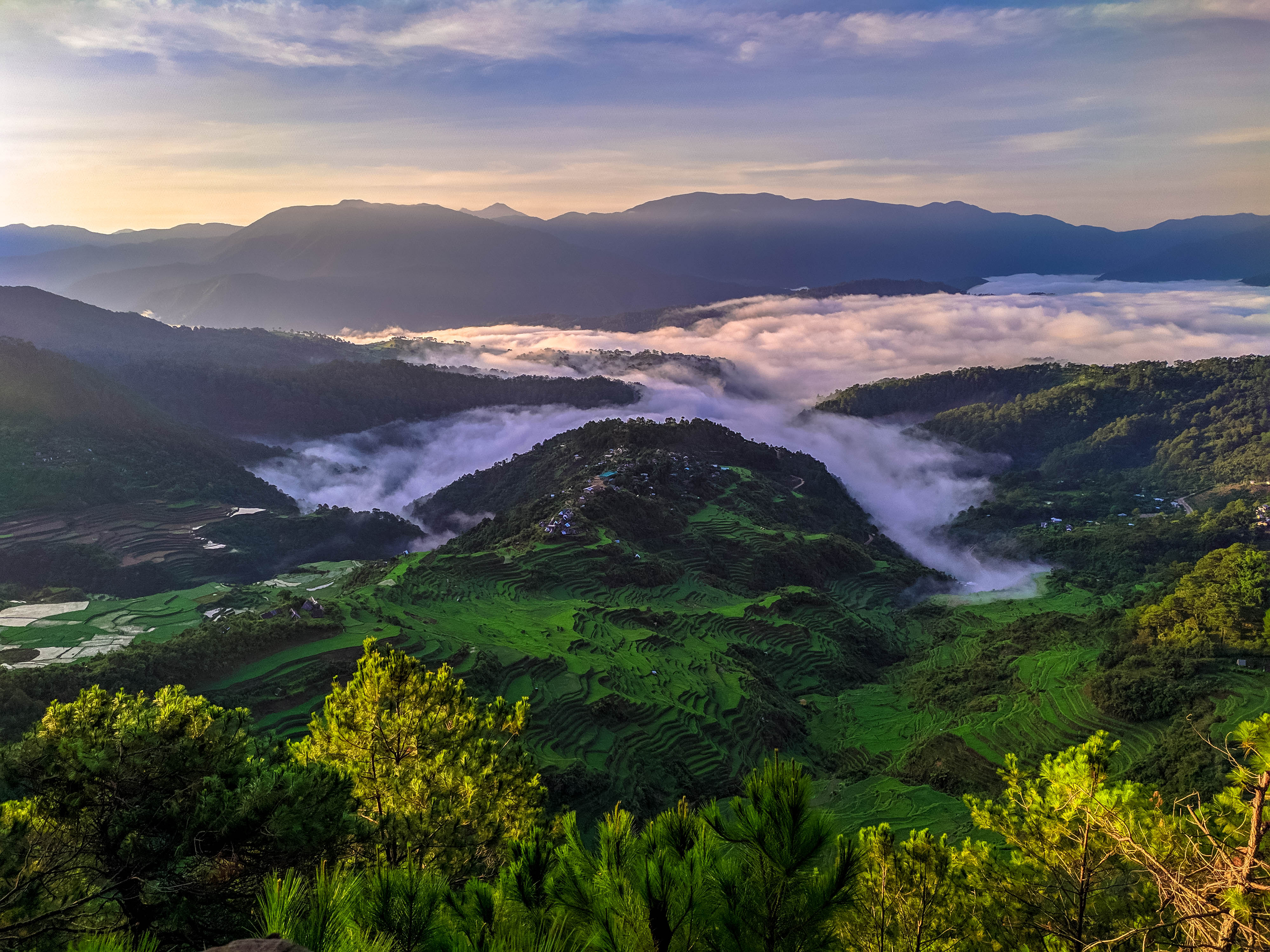
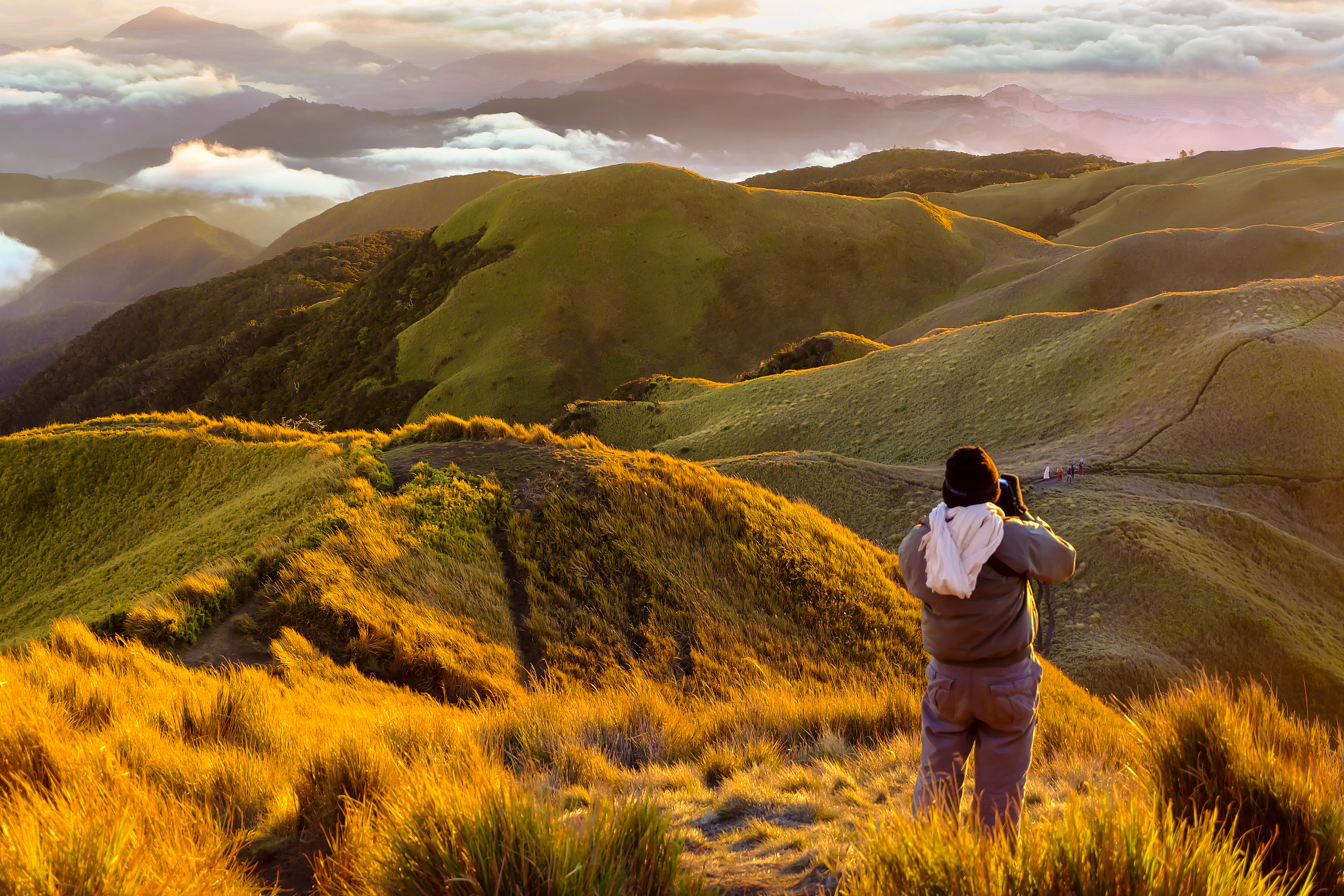
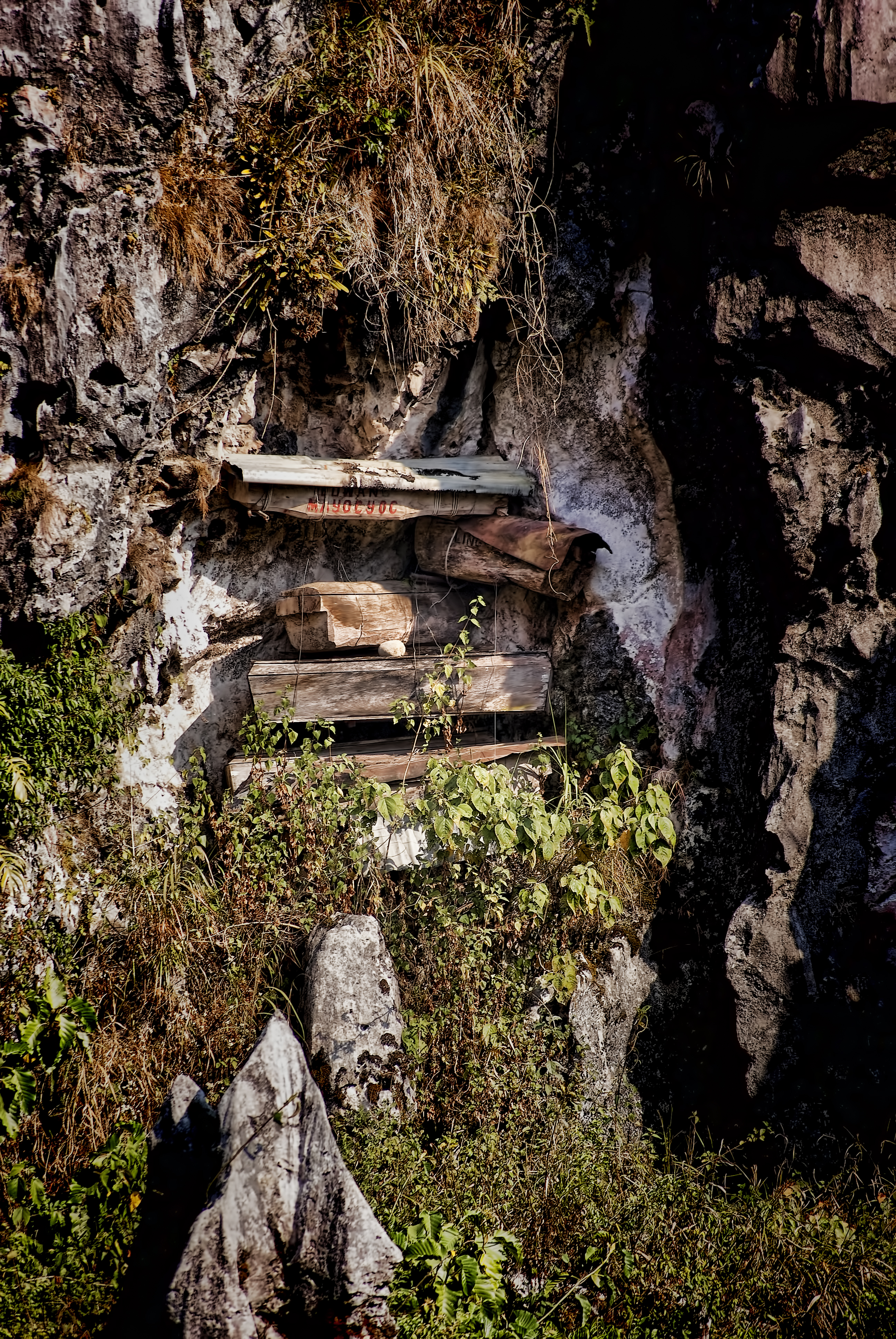
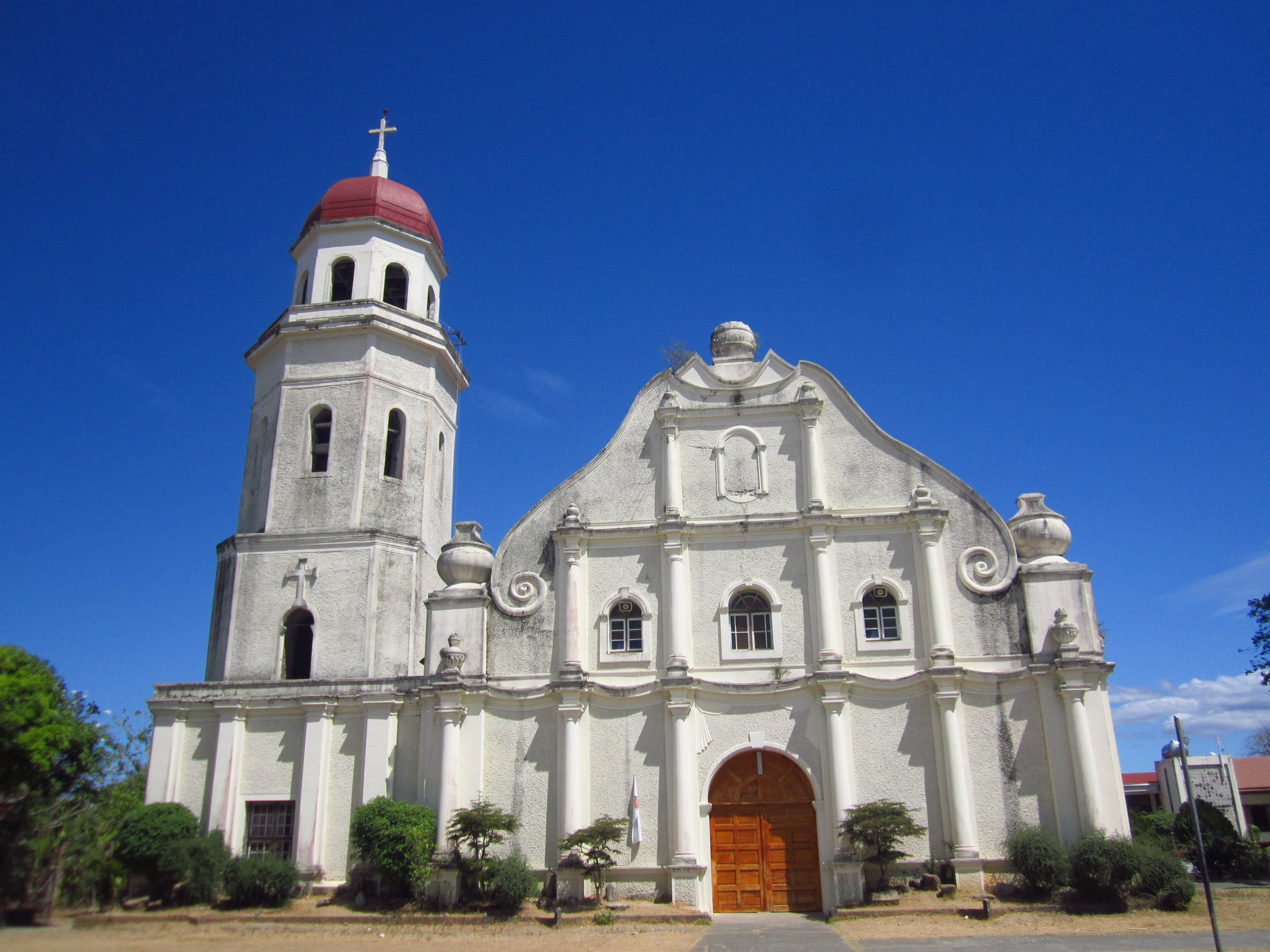
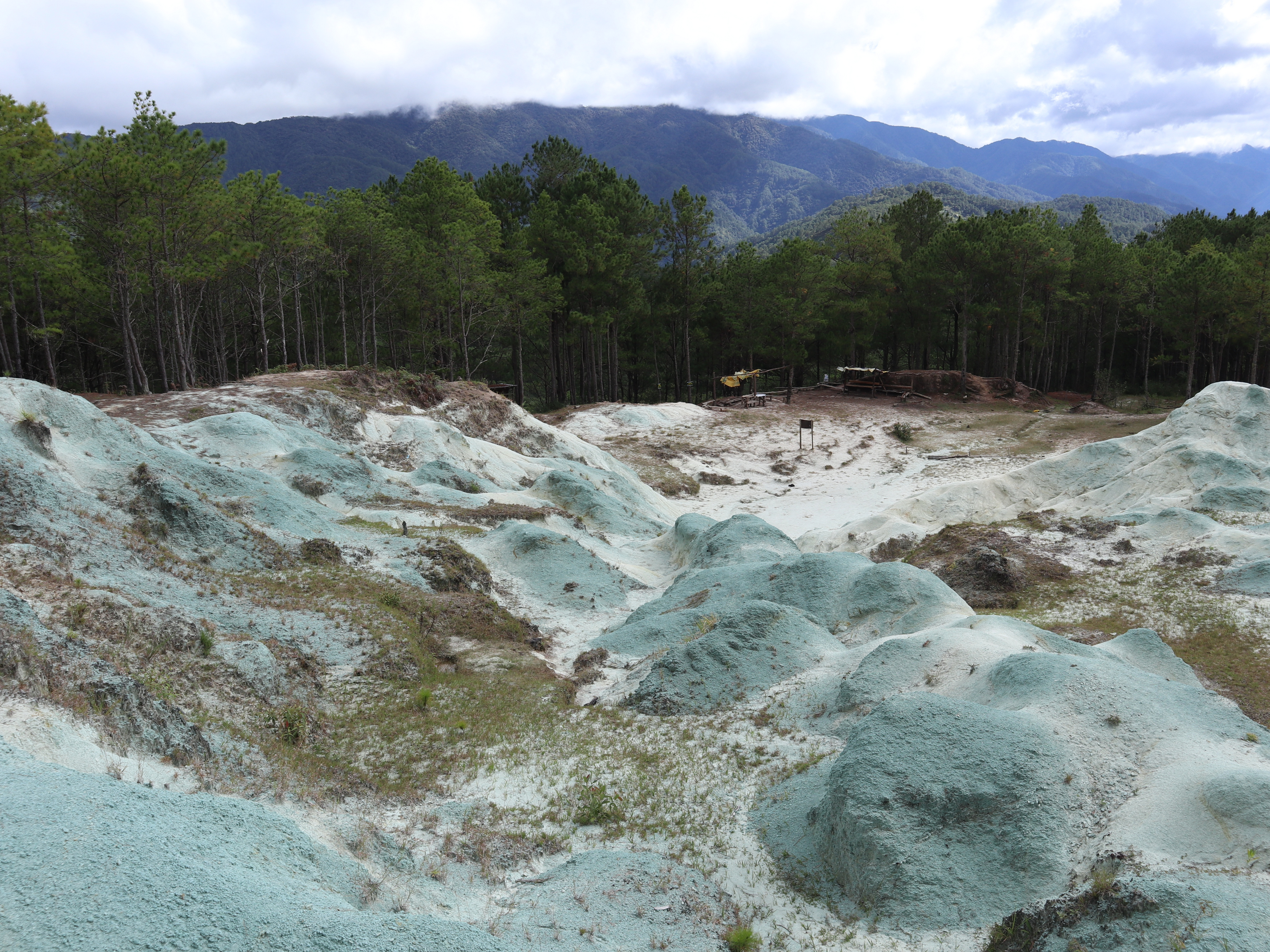
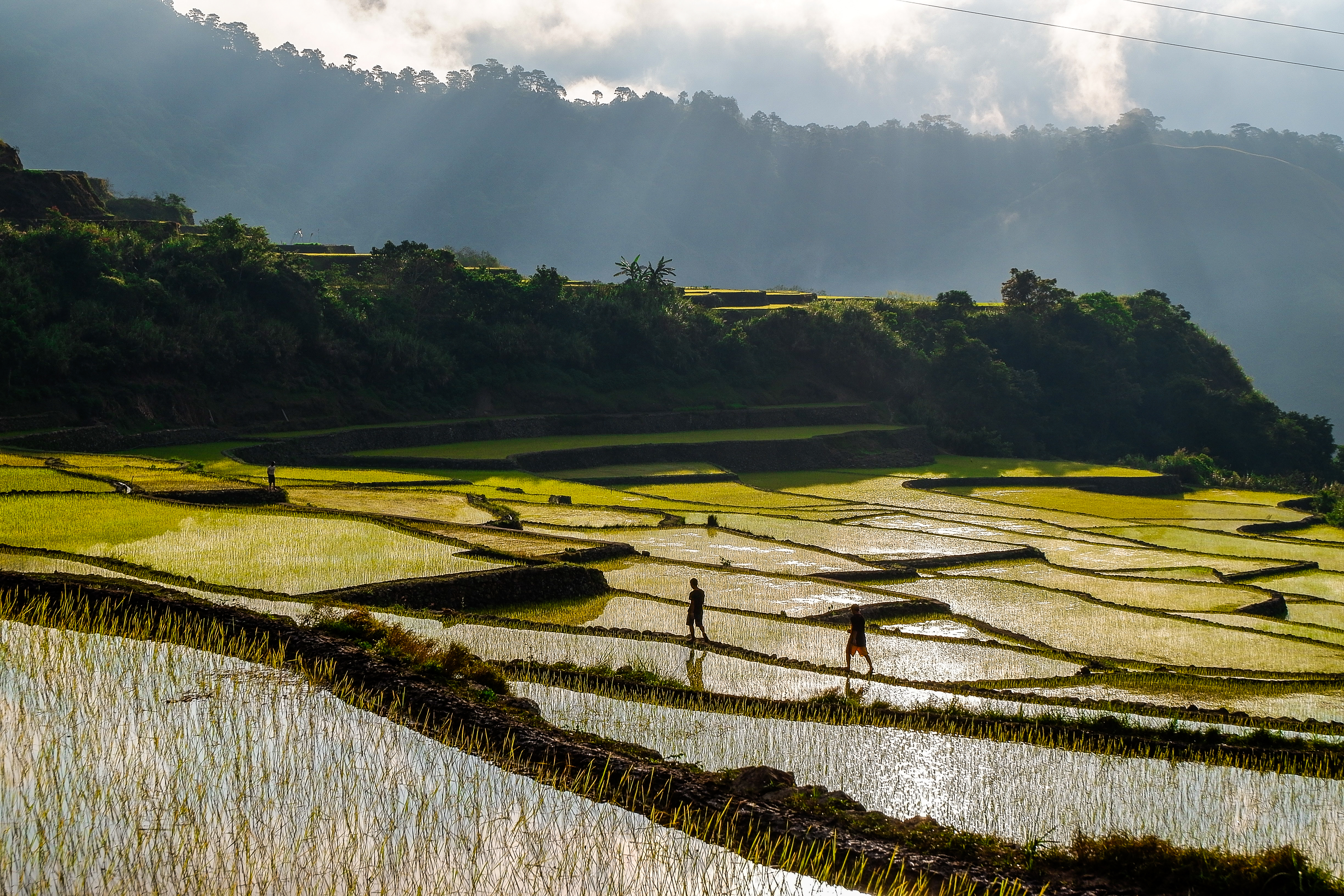
- Clockwise from the top: Banaue Rice Terraces, Burnham Park Lake, Maligcong Rice Terraces, Sagada Hanging Cofins, Sagada Blue Mountain, Buscalan Rice Terraces, Tayum Church, Mount Pulag, Abulog River, and Baguio Cathedral

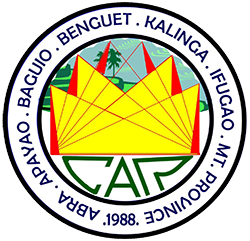
- Seal
- Anthem: Cordillera Hymn
- Location in the Philippines
- Interactive map of Cordillera
- Coordinates: 17°10′N 121°10′E
- Country: Philippines
- Island group: Luzon
- Regional center and largest city: Baguio

Area
  - Total: 19,422.03 km^{2} (7,498.89 sq mi)
- Highest elevation (Mount Pulag): 2,928 m (9,606 ft)

Population (2024 census)
  - Total: 1,808,985
  - Density: 93.14088/km^{2} (241.2338/sq mi)
  - Households: 439,166

Divisions
  - Provinces: 6: Abra; Apayao; Benguet; Ifugao; Kalinga; Mountain Province
  - Independent cities: 1: Baguio
  - Component cities: 1: Tabuk
  - Municipalities: 75
  - Barangays: 1,178
  - Districts: 7

Economy
  - Poverty incidence: 2.7% (2025)
  - GDP total: US$7.8 billion
  - GDP per capita: US$4,145
  - HDI (2023): 0.749 high · 2nd of 17
- Time zone: UTC+8 (PST)
- PSGC: 140000000
- ISO 3166 code: PH-15
- Electorate: 1,105,063 voters (2025)
- Languages: Ilocano; Ibaloi; Kankanaey; Kalanguya; Kalinga; Ifugao; Itneg; Isneg; Pangasinan; Filipino; English; others

The Cordillera Administrative Region (CAR; Ilocano: Rehion/Deppaar Administratibo ti Kordiliera; Filipino: Rehiyong Administratibo ng Cordillera), also known as the Cordillera Region and Cordillera (IPA: [kɔrdiljɛra]), is an administrative region in the Philippines, situated within the island of Luzon. It is the only landlocked region in the archipelago, bordered by the Ilocos Region to the west and southwest, and by the Cagayan Valley Region to the north, east, and southeast.

The region comprises six provinces: Abra, Apayao, Benguet, Ifugao, Kalinga and Mountain Province. The regional center is the highly urbanized city of Baguio, which is the largest city in the region.

The region was officially created on July 15, 1987, covering most of the Cordillera Mountain Range of Luzon that is home to numerous ethnic groups. Nueva Vizcaya province has a majority Igorot population transplanted by the American colonial government in the Cagayan Valley Region instead during the early 20th century, as does Quirino.

According to the 2020 Census of Population and Housing, this region is the least populated region in the Philippines, less than that of the national capital, the City of Manila.

== History ==
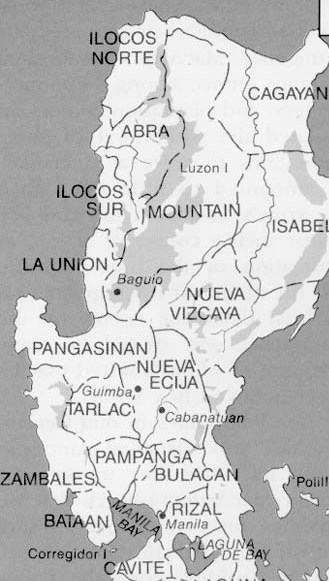
An old U.S. Army map showing Mountain province covering the present areas of Benguet, Ifugao, Kalinga and Apayao.

=== Spanish colonial era ===
During the Spanish occupation of the Philippines, Christianization and eventual subjugation of the mountain region proved difficult for the Spanish colonial government. Several comandancias were established by the Spanish colonial government in strategic areas of the mountain region. Among them were Amburayan, Cabugaoan, Kayapa, Quiangan, Itaves, Apayaos, Lepanto, Benguet, Bontoc, Banaue, and Tiagan.

On August 18, 1908, during the American regime, Mountain Province was established by the Philippine Commission with the enactment of Act No. 1876. Ifugao, which was part of Nueva Vizcaya province, and the former Spanish comandancias of Amburayan, Apayao, Benguet, Bontoc, Kalinga and Lepanto, were annexed to the newly created province as sub-provinces. Amburayan was later abolished in 1920 and its corresponding territories were transferred to the provinces of Ilocos Sur and La Union. Lepanto was also reduced in size and its towns were integrated into the sub-provinces of Bontoc and Benguet, and to the province of Ilocos Sur.

=== Philippine independence ===
On June 18, 1966, Republic Act No. 4695 was enacted to split Mountain Province and create four separate and independent provinces namely Benguet, Ifugao, Kalinga-Apayao, and Mountain Province. Ifugao and Kalinga-Apayao were placed under the jurisdiction of the Cagayan Valley region, with Benguet and Mountain Province placed under the Ilocos Region. From that time on, Ferdinand Marcos imposed a migration policy for Ilocano settlers into those provinces.

=== The Martial Law era ===
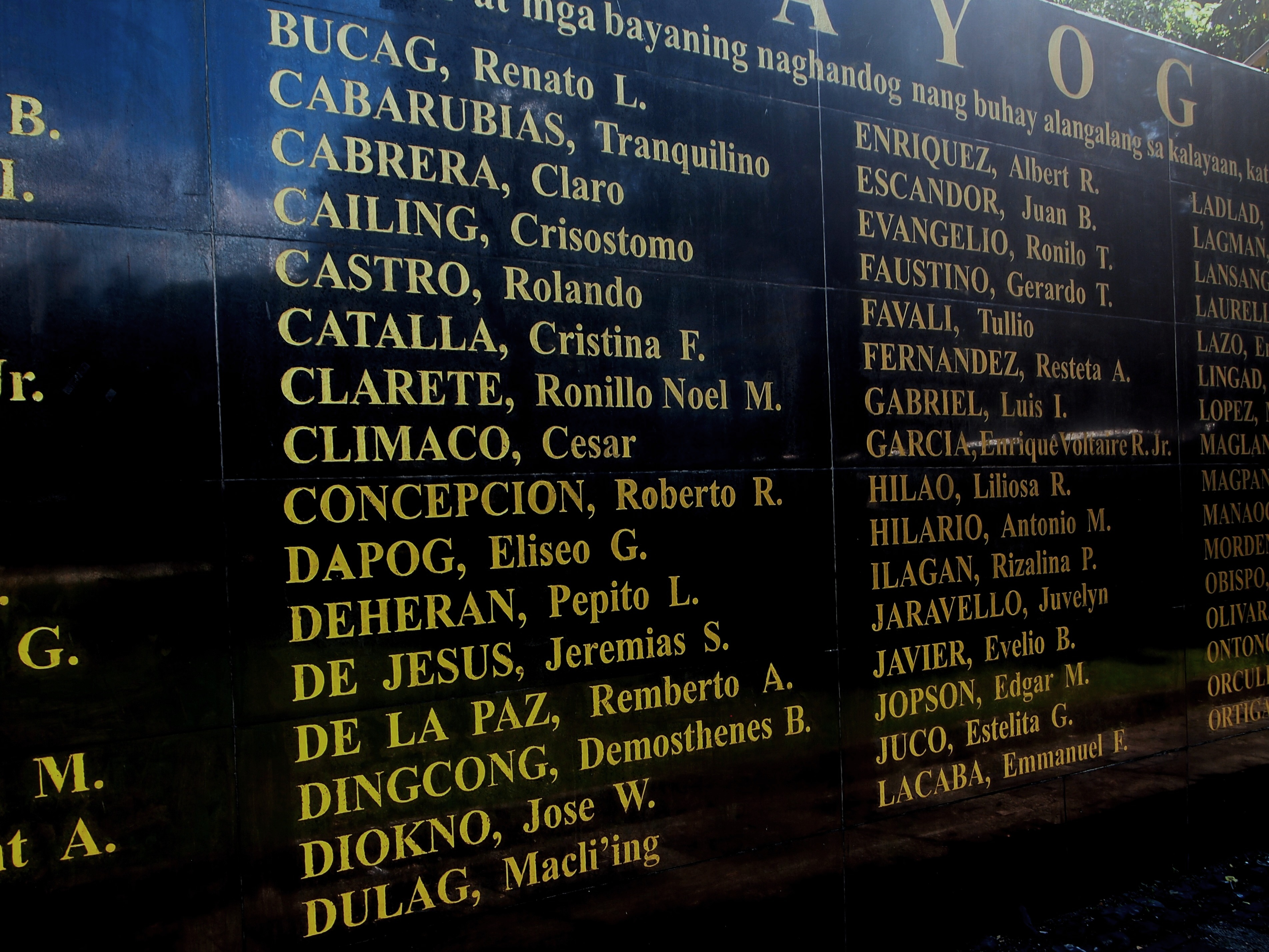
Detail of the Wall of Remembrance at the Bantayog ng mga Bayani in Quezon City, showing names from the first batch of Bantayog Honorees, including that of Macli-ing Dulag.

After the declaration of martial law by Ferdinand Marcos in 1972, the region became the focus of militarization as a result of local objections to the government's push for the Chico River Dam Project near Sadanga, Mountain Province and Tinglayan, Kalinga. Frustrated by the project delays caused by the opposition, Ferdinand Marcos issued Presidential Decree no. 848 in December 1975, constituting the municipalities of Lubuagan, Tinglayan, Tanudan, and Pasil into a "Kalinga Special Development Region" (KSDR), in an effort to neutralize opposition to the Chico IV dam.

Empowered by martial law to conduct warrantless arrests, the 60th PC Brigade had arrested at least 150 locals by April 1977, accusing them of supposed subversion and of obstructing government projects, and various other offenses such as boycotting the October 1976 Constitutional Referendum. Individuals arrested included tribal papangat (leaders/elders), young couples, and in at least one case, a 12-year-old child. By December 1978, parts of the Chico IV area had been declared "free fire zones", no-man's-land areas where the army could freely shoot people and animals without permits.

On April 24, 1980, Marcos-controlled military forces assassinated Macli-ing Dulag a pangat (leader) of the Butbut tribe of Kalinga. The assassination became a watershed moment, marking the first time the mainstream Philippine press could be openly critical against Marcos and the military, and building up a sense of Igorot identity that eventually led to Cordillera autonomy.

After the end of the Marcos administration due to the 1986 People Power Revolution, the succeeding government under President Corazon Aquino secured a ceasefire with the main indigenous armed group in the Cordilleras, the Cordillera People's Liberation Army led by Conrado Balweg. The Aquino government made a sipat or indigenous treaty, which would be known as the Mount Data Peace Accord, with the CPLA on September 13, 1986, ending hostilities.

=== Creation of the region ===
On July 15, 1987, President Corazon Aquino issued Executive Order 220 which created the Cordillera Administrative Region. The provinces of Abra, Benguet and Mountain Province (of the Ilocos Region), and Ifugao and Kalinga-Apayao (of the Cagayan Valley) were annexed as part of the newly created region. Cordillera Administrative Region is the revival of the U.S. political division of Mountain Province, with Abra which was part of Spanish province of Ilocos. Nueva Vizcaya & Quirino were not included in the region despite having an Igorot majority at the time.

On February 14, 1995, Kalinga-Apayao, one of the five provinces of the region was split into two separate and independent provinces of Apayao and Kalinga with the enactment of Republic Act No. 7878.

Several attempts at legalizing autonomy in the Cordillera region have failed in two separate plebiscites. An affirmative vote for the law on regional autonomy is a precondition by the 1987 Philippine Constitution to give the region autonomy in self-governance much like the Autonomous Region in Muslim Mindanao (now the BARMM) in southern Philippines. The first law Republic Act No. 6766, took effect on October 23, 1989 but failed to muster a majority vote in the plebiscite on January 30, 1990. The second law, Republic Act No. 8438 passed by Congress of the Philippines on December 22, 1997, also failed to pass the approval of the Cordillera peoples in a region-wide plebiscite on March 7, 1998.

At present, a third organic act of the Cordillera is in the offing supported by the Cordillera Regional Development Council.

=== Contemporary ===
In September 2000, the municipal council of Itogon, Benguet, withdrew support for the San Roque Dam project. The project had met a lot of resistance, because of the reported failure of its proponents to update its Environmental Certificate of Compliance (ECC) and to submit a watershed management plan required for a project of that magnitude. The San Roque Dam was to become one of the biggest dams in the world and would threaten the living environment of the Igorot.

The Cordillera Peoples Alliance (CPA), an indigenous rights organization in the region, in co-operation with other organizations, had highly resisted this project and thus booked a little victory. In May 2001, however, President Arroyo stated that the San Roque Dam project would proceed regardless due to the fact that it had already been initiated and therefore was difficult to stop. At the same time, she promised not to sacrifice the environment, to rehabilitate the people who will lose their homes, to compensate those who will suffer, and to not initiate any more large-scale irrigation projects in the future.

In December 2000, the Supreme Court of the Philippines dismissed a petition that questioned the constitutional legality of the Indigenous Peoples Rights Act (IPRA), and act which came into existence in 1997 giving the peoples of the Cordillera decisive influence over the establishment of foreign mining companies. In this act, ownership over the lands was regarded as communal, rather than individual and thus coincided more with the view on ownership of the Igorot. The IPRA was totally different in tone than the 1995 Mining Code.

Without consultation from the people of the Cordilleras, the Mining Code gave companies the freedom to devastate tribal lands, allowed 100% foreign ownership, and gave companies the right to displace and resettle people within their concessionary areas. Some influential people filed a lawsuit with the Supreme Court against the IPRA, because it contradicted with the Mining Code and would therefore be unlawful. The petition was dismissed in a 7–7 vote by the Supreme Court.

A bill creating an autonomous Cordillera was filed in Congress in 2014, but it was not backed by strategic politicians in the region due to lack of support from the national government. However, in 2017, all provincial congressmen within the CAR jointly filed a new Bill creating an autonomous Cordillera, the first time in three decades where all provincial district representatives called in unison for autonomy. The move was made due to the election win of President Duterte, who publicly supported the creation of an autonomous Cordillera. However, questions lingered on the issue of Nueva Vizcaya's exclusion from the proposed region, despite being culturally and geographically part of the Cordilleras, leaving Nueva Vizcaya Igorots left out from the proposal.

== Geography ==
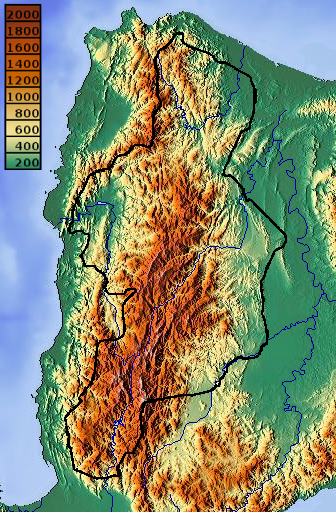
Topographical map

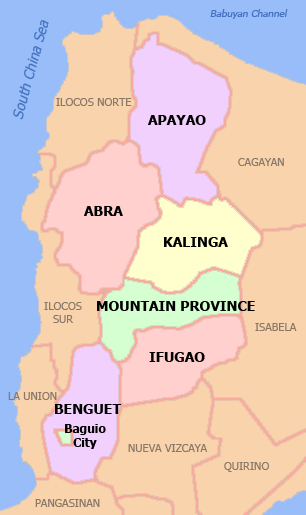
Political map

The region is the only landlocked region in the Philippines, bounded on the northeast and east by the Cagayan Valley, and on the southwest and west by the Ilocos Region.

The region is primarily mountainous, positioned in the Cordillera Central mountain range, which includes Mount Pulag, the highest mountain in Luzon.

Within the region are several streams and rivers including the Chico River, which is a tributary of the Cagayan River. Other major rivers include

- Abra
- Abulog
- Agno
- Ahin
- Amburayan
- Apayao
- Bued
- Siffu

=== Administrative divisions ===
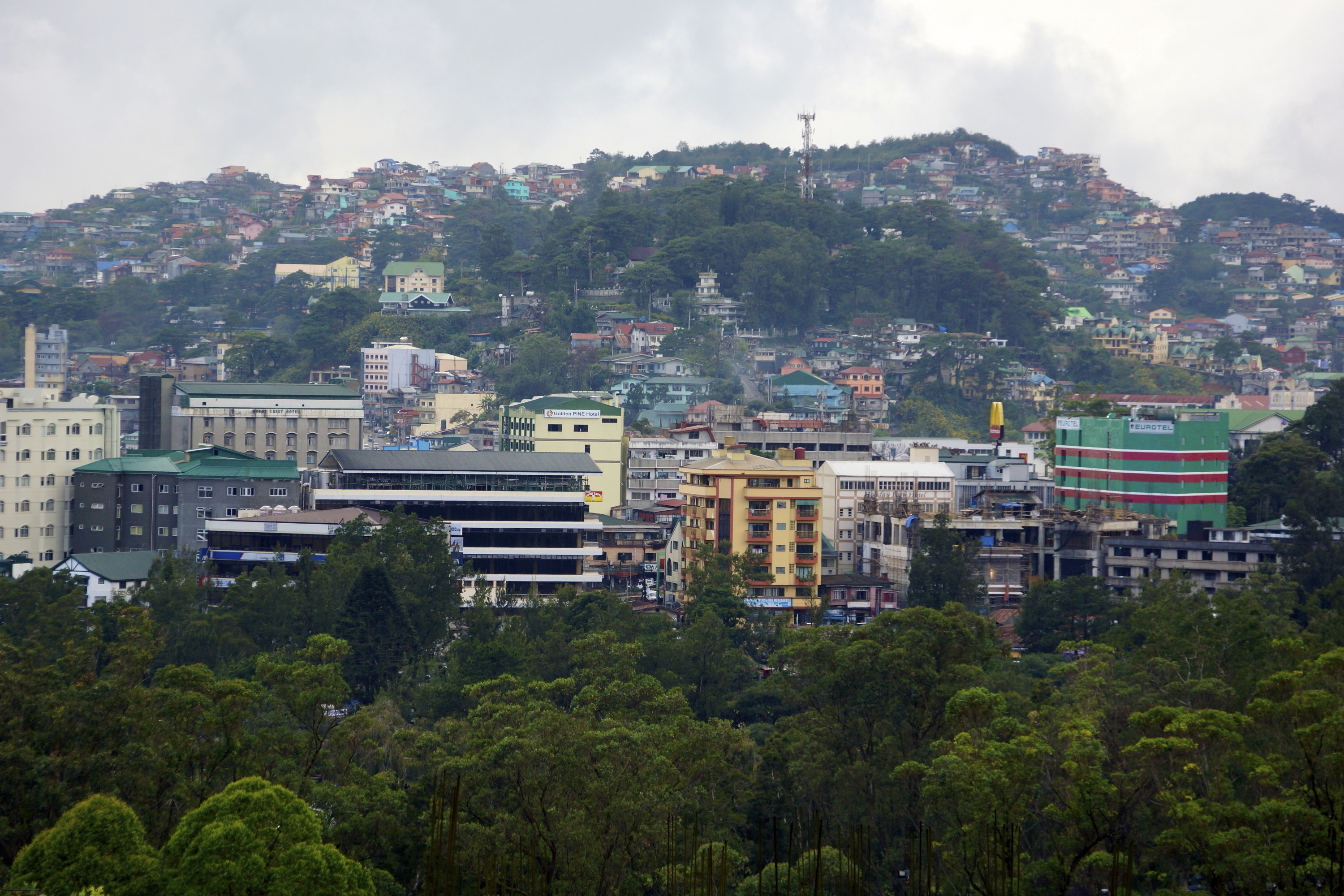
A view of Baguio as seen in November 2012

Cordillera Administrative Region is politically subdivided into 6 provinces. It has 2 cities; the highly urbanized city of Baguio, and the component city of Tabuk. There are 1,178 barangays in the region. Geographically, the western half of Nueva Vizcaya is part of the main Cordilleras, while its eastern half is part of the Caraballos, the meeting point of the Cordilleras and the Sierra Madre. There have been moves to reunify Nueva Vizcaya with the Cordilleras, however, no such legislation has yet been introduced in Congress.

==== Regional divisions ====
| Province or HUC | | Capital | Population (2020) | | Area | | Density | | Cities | Muni. | Barangay |
| | | | | | km^{2} | sq mi | /km^{2} | /sq mi | | | |
|---|---|---|---|---|---|---|---|---|---|---|---|
| Abra | | Bangued | 14.0% | 250,985 | 4,199.72 | 1,621.52 | 60 | 160 | 0 | 27 | 303 |
| Apayao | | Kabugao | 6.9% | 124,366 | 4,502.33 | 1,738.36 | 28 | 73 | 0 | 7 | 133 |
| Benguet | | La Trinidad | 25.6% | 460,683 | 2,769.08 | 1,069.15 | 170 | 440 | 1 | 13 | 140 |
| Ifugao | | Lagawe | 11.5% | 207,498 | 2,618.01 | 1,010.82 | 79 | 200 | 0 | 11 | 176 |
| Kalinga | | Tabuk | 12.8% | 229,570 | 3,282.04 | 1,267.20 | 70 | 180 | 1 | 7 | 153 |
| Mountain Province | | Bontoc | 8.8% | 158,200 | 2,389.43 | 922.56 | 66 | 170 | 0 | 10 | 144 |
| Baguio | † | — | 20.4% | 366,358 | 57.51 | 22.20 | 6,400 | 17,000 | — | — | 129 |
| Total | | | | 1,797,660 | 19,818.12 | 7,651.82 | 91 | 240 | 2 | 75 | 1,178 |
† Baguio is a highly urbanized city; figures are excluded from Benguet.

===== Governors and vice governors =====
| Province | Image | Governor | Political Party | Vice Governor |
|---|---|---|---|---|
| Abra | | Eustaquio P. Bersamin | PFP | Ana Marie F. Bersamin |
| Apayao | | Elias Bulut Jr. | NPC | Kyle Mariah Chelsea S. Bulut-Cunan |
| Benguet | | Melchor Diclas | Lakas | Marie Rose Fongwan-Kepes |
| Ifugao | | Jerry U. Dalipog | Lakas | Martin L. Habawel Jr. |
| Kalinga | | James Edduba | Lakas | Dave Q. Odiem |
| Mountain Province | | Bonifacio C. Lacwasan | PFP | Jose O. Dominguez |

==== Cities and municipalities ====
- † Regional center

| City/Municipality | Population (2020) | Area | | Density | | Class | Income class | Province |
| | | km^{2} | sq mi | /km^{2} | /sq mi | | | |
|---|---|---|---|---|---|---|---|---|
| Aguinaldo | 21,128 | 538.05 | 207.74 | 39 | 100 | Municipality | 2nd | Ifugao |
| Alfonso Lista | 34,061 | 347.46 | 134.16 | 98 | 250 | Municipality | 3rd | Ifugao |
| Asipulo | 15,963 | 182.87 | 70.61 | 87 | 230 | Municipality | 5th | Ifugao |
| Atok | 19,218 | 214.99 | 83.01 | 89 | 230 | Municipality | 4th | Benguet |
| † Baguio | 366,358 | 57.51 | 22.20 | 6,400 | 17,000 | Highly urbanized city | 1st | Benguet |
| Bakun | 14,535 | 286.91 | 110.78 | 51 | 130 | Municipality | 3rd | Benguet |
| Balbalan | 12,914 | 542.69 | 209.53 | 24 | 62 | Municipality | 3rd | Kalinga |
| Banaue | 20,652 | 191.20 | 73.82 | 110 | 280 | Municipality | 4th | Ifugao |
| Bangued | 50,382 | 105.70 | 40.81 | 480 | 1,200 | Municipality | 1st | Abra |
| Barlig | 4,796 | 228.64 | 88.28 | 21 | 54 | Municipality | 5th | Mountain Province |
| Bauko | 32,021 | 153.00 | 59.07 | 210 | 540 | Municipality | 4th | Mountain Province |
| Besao | 6,873 | 173.62 | 67.04 | 40 | 100 | Municipality | 5th | Mountain Province |
| Bokod | 14,435 | 274.96 | 106.16 | 52 | 130 | Municipality | 4th | Benguet |
| Boliney | 4,551 | 216.92 | 83.75 | 21 | 54 | Municipality | 5th | Abra |
| Bontoc | 24,104 | 396.10 | 152.94 | 61 | 160 | Municipality | 2nd | Mountain Province |
| Bucay | 17,953 | 102.16 | 39.44 | 180 | 470 | Municipality | 5th | Abra |
| Bucloc | 2,395 | 63.77 | 24.62 | 38 | 98 | Municipality | 6th | Abra |
| Buguias | 44,877 | 175.88 | 67.91 | 260 | 670 | Municipality | 3rd | Benguet |
| Calanasan | 12,550 | 1,256.15 | 485.00 | 10.0 | 26 | Municipality | 1st | Apayao |
| Conner | 27,552 | 694.30 | 268.07 | 40 | 100 | Municipality | 2nd | Apayao |
| Daguioman | 2,019 | 114.37 | 44.16 | 18 | 47 | Municipality | 5th | Abra |
| Danglas | 4,074 | 156.02 | 60.24 | 26 | 67 | Municipality | 5th | Abra |
| Dolores | 11,512 | 47.45 | 18.32 | 240 | 620 | Municipality | 5th | Abra |
| Flora | 17,944 | 324.40 | 125.25 | 55 | 140 | Municipality | 3rd | Apayao |
| Hingyon | 9,930 | 62.02 | 23.95 | 160 | 410 | Municipality | 5th | Ifugao |
| Hungduan | 8,866 | 260.30 | 100.50 | 34 | 88 | Municipality | 4th | Ifugao |
| Itogon | 61,498 | 449.73 | 173.64 | 140 | 360 | Municipality | 1st | Benguet |
| Kabayan | 15,806 | 242.69 | 93.70 | 65 | 170 | Municipality | 4th | Benguet |
| Kabugao | 16,215 | 935.12 | 361.05 | 17 | 44 | Municipality | 1st | Apayao |
| Kapangan | 19,297 | 164.39 | 63.47 | 120 | 310 | Municipality | 4th | Benguet |
| Kiangan | 17,691 | 200.00 | 77.22 | 88 | 230 | Municipality | 4th | Ifugao |
| Kibungan | 17,051 | 254.86 | 98.40 | 67 | 170 | Municipality | 4th | Benguet |
| La Paz | 16,493 | 51.41 | 19.85 | 320 | 830 | Municipality | 5th | Abra |
| La Trinidad | 137,404 | 70.04 | 27.04 | 2,000 | 5,200 | Municipality | 1st | Benguet |
| Lacub | 3,612 | 295.30 | 114.02 | 12 | 31 | Municipality | 5th | Abra |
| Lagangilang | 14,914 | 101.44 | 39.17 | 150 | 390 | Municipality | 5th | Abra |
| Lagawe | 18,876 | 208.91 | 80.66 | 90 | 230 | Municipality | 4th | Ifugao |
| Lagayan | 4,488 | 215.97 | 83.39 | 21 | 54 | Municipality | 5th | Abra |
| Lamut | 26,235 | 149.45 | 57.70 | 180 | 470 | Municipality | 4th | Ifugao |
| Langiden | 3,576 | 116.29 | 44.90 | 31 | 80 | Municipality | 5th | Abra |
| Licuan-Baay | 4,566 | 256.42 | 99.00 | 18 | 47 | Municipality | 5th | Abra |
| Luba | 6,518 | 148.27 | 57.25 | 44 | 110 | Municipality | 5th | Abra |
| Lubuagan | 9,323 | 234.20 | 90.43 | 40 | 100 | Municipality | 4th | Kalinga |
| Luna | 21,297 | 606.04 | 233.99 | 35 | 91 | Municipality | 2nd | Apayao |
| Malibcong | 4,027 | 283.17 | 109.33 | 14 | 36 | Municipality | 5th | Abra |
| Manabo | 11,611 | 110.95 | 42.84 | 100 | 260 | Municipality | 5th | Abra |
| Mankayan | 37,233 | 130.48 | 50.38 | 290 | 750 | Municipality | 1st | Benguet |
| Mayoyao | 15,621 | 238.05 | 91.91 | 66 | 170 | Municipality | 4th | Ifugao |
| Natonin | 10,339 | 252.00 | 97.30 | 41 | 110 | Municipality | 4th | Mountain Province |
| Paracelis | 31,168 | 570.16 | 220.14 | 55 | 140 | Municipality | 2nd | Mountain Province |
| Pasil | 10,577 | 189.00 | 72.97 | 56 | 150 | Municipality | 5th | Kalinga |
| Peñarrubia | 6,951 | 38.29 | 14.78 | 180 | 470 | Municipality | 6th | Abra |
| Pidigan | 12,475 | 49.15 | 18.98 | 250 | 650 | Municipality | 5th | Abra |
| Pilar | 10,146 | 66.10 | 25.52 | 150 | 390 | Municipality | 5th | Abra |
| Pinukpuk | 34,275 | 743.56 | 287.09 | 46 | 120 | Municipality | 1st | Kalinga |
| Pudtol | 15,491 | 401.02 | 154.83 | 39 | 100 | Municipality | 4th | Apayao |
| Rizal | 19,554 | 231.00 | 89.19 | 85 | 220 | Municipality | 4th | Kalinga |
| Sabangan | 9,621 | 72.04 | 27.81 | 130 | 340 | Municipality | 5th | Mountain Province |
| Sablan | 11,588 | 105.63 | 40.78 | 110 | 280 | Municipality | 5th | Benguet |
| Sadanga | 8,427 | 259.79 | 100.31 | 32 | 83 | Municipality | 5th | Mountain Province |
| Sagada | 11,510 | 109.71 | 42.36 | 100 | 260 | Municipality | 5th | Mountain Province |
| Sallapadan | 6,389 | 128.62 | 49.66 | 50 | 130 | Municipality | 5th | Abra |
| San Isidro | 4,745 | 48.07 | 18.56 | 99 | 260 | Municipality | 5th | Abra |
| San Juan | 10,688 | 64.08 | 24.74 | 170 | 440 | Municipality | 5th | Abra |
| San Quintin | 5,705 | 66.59 | 25.71 | 86 | 220 | Municipality | 5th | Abra |
| Santa Marcela | 13,317 | 196.32 | 75.80 | 68 | 180 | Municipality | 4th | Apayao |
| Tabuk | 121,033 | 700.25 | 270.37 | 190 | 490 | Component city | 5th | Kalinga |
| Tadian | 19,341 | 145.20 | 56.06 | 130 | 340 | Municipality | 4th | Mountain Province |
| Tanudan | 8,746 | 307.55 | 118.75 | 28 | 73 | Municipality | 4th | Kalinga |
| Tayum | 14,869 | 61.14 | 23.61 | 240 | 620 | Municipality | 5th | Abra |
| Tineg | 4,977 | 744.80 | 287.57 | 6.7 | 17 | Municipality | 2nd | Abra |
| Tinglayan | 13,148 | 283.00 | 109.27 | 46 | 120 | Municipality | 4th | Kalinga |
| Tinoc | 18,475 | 239.70 | 92.55 | 77 | 200 | Municipality | 4th | Ifugao |
| Tuba | 48,312 | 295.97 | 114.27 | 160 | 410 | Municipality | 1st | Benguet |
| Tublay | 19,429 | 102.55 | 39.59 | 190 | 490 | Municipality | 5th | Benguet |
| Tubo | 5,674 | 409.87 | 158.25 | 14 | 36 | Municipality | 4th | Abra |
| Villaviciosa | 5,675 | 102.93 | 39.74 | 55 | 140 | Municipality | 5th | Abra |

== Demographics ==
Population census of Cordillera Administrative Region
| Year | Pop. | ±% p.a. |
|---|---|---|
| 1903 | 145,186 | — |
| 1918 | 267,041 | +4.15% |
| 1939 | 384,654 | +1.75% |
| 1948 | 364,720 | −0.59% |
| 1960 | 551,032 | +3.50% |
| 1970 | 730,906 | +2.86% |
| 1975 | 811,103 | +2.11% |
| 1980 | 914,432 | +2.43% |
| 1990 | 1,146,191 | +2.29% |
| 1995 | 1,254,838 | +1.71% |
| 2000 | 1,365,220 | +1.82% |
| 2007 | 1,520,847 | +1.50% |
| 2010 | 1,616,867 | +2.25% |
| 2015 | 1,722,006 | +1.21% |
| 2020 | 1,797,660 | +0.91% |
| 2024 | 1,808,985 | +0.15% |
Source: Philippine Statistics Authority

=== Ethnic groups ===
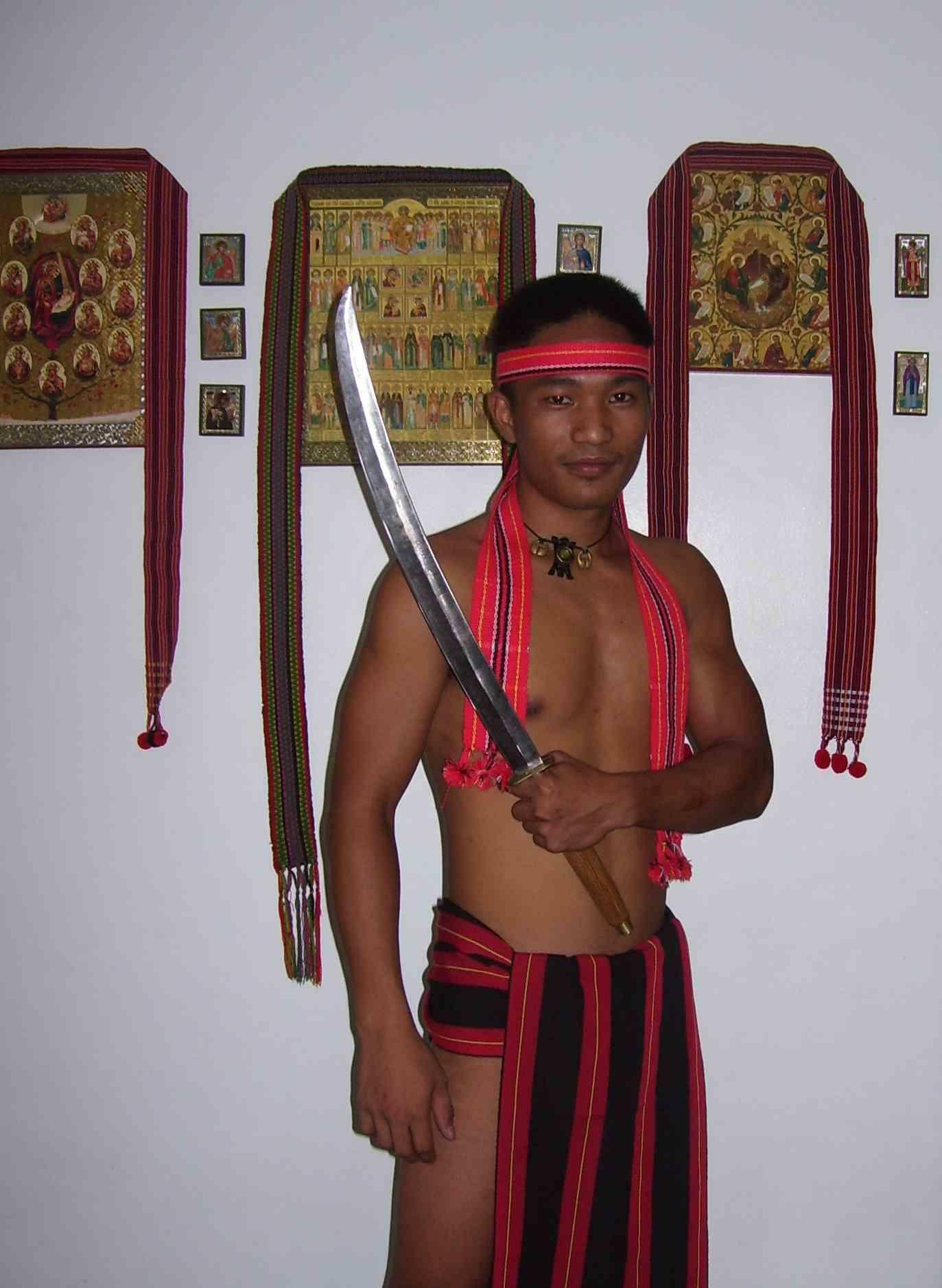
A man from Tinglayan vested in traditional garb holding a handcrafted weapon first produced during the Second World War; traditional Kalinga cloth is draped over Orthodox icons in the manner of Russian nabozhnyks.

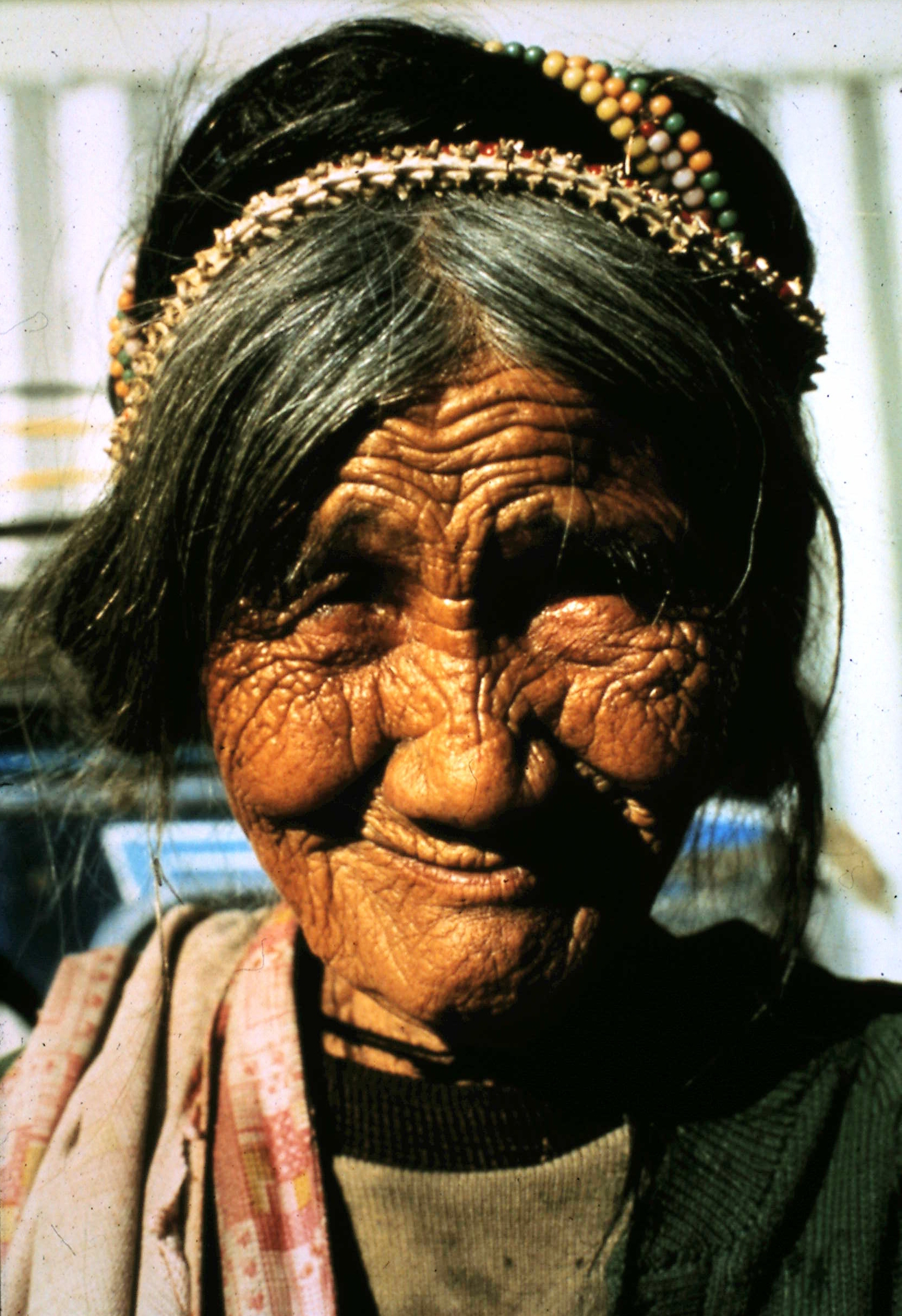
A Bontoc woman with a snake skeleton in her hair. Skeletons serve as a charm against lightning.

Cordillera is home to many ethnic tribes living on the Cordillera mountain range. They are commonly referred to as the Igorot.

==== Ethnic people of Abra ====
The Tingguians are composed of sub-groups known as the Itneg tribes which includes Adasen, Balatok, Banaw, Belwang, Binungan, Gubang, Inlaud, Mabaka, Maeng, Masadiit, and Muyadan or Ammutan.: Their places in Abra are as follows:

1. Adasen – Lagayan, Lagangilang, San Juan and Tineg
2. Banaw – Daguioman, Malibcong, also found in Balbalan, Kalinga
3. Binungan – Baay-Licuan and Lacub
4. Balatok – in the villages of Amti, Kilong-olaw, & Danak, all in Boliney
5. Belwang – in the village of Dao-angan in Boliney
6. Gubang – Malibcong
7. Inlaud – Lagangilang and Peñarrubia, in Lumaba village of Villaviciosa, in the villages of Abang and Patoc in Bucay, in Langiden, San Isidro, San Quintin, Danglas (also found in some parts of Nueva Era)
8. Mabaka – Lacub and Malibcong
9. Maeng – Luba, Tubo and Villaviciosa, (also found in San Emilio, Ilocos Sur, Banayoyo and other towns in Ilocos Sur)
10. Masadiit – Sallapadan, Bucloc and in the village of Sapdaan in Manabo, and in barangays Poblacion, Bawiyan, and Dumagas in Boliney
11. Ammutan a.k.a. Muyadan tribe – in Manabo

==== Ethnic people of Apayao ====
1. Isnag tribe – also known as Isneg comprising the sub-groups known as the Ymandaya and Imallod (Isnag refers to the people, while Isneg refers to the dialect). Isnags are found not only in Apayao but also in the eastern section of Ilocos Norte, northwestern portion of Cagayan, and Tineg, Abra. Their places of abode in Apayao are as follows:
  Ymandaya (Isnag) – Calanasan (Bayag)
  Imallod (Isnag) – Kabugao, Conner, Pudtol, and some parts of Luna (Macatel)
2. Malaweg – Conner
3. Itawis – Conner

==== Ethnic people of Benguet ====
1. Ibaloi
2. Kankanaey
3. Kalanguya
4. Karao Tribe

==== Ethnic people of Ifugao ====
1. Ifugao
2. Tuwali
3. Ayangan
4. Kalanguya
5. Ifannawer – Banaue

==== Ethnic people of Kalinga ====
1. Kalinga
2. Tubog
3. Banao
4. Dakaran, Ga-ang, Lubo, Mangali, Taloctoc, Pangol, Biga
5. Tanudan
6. Tongrayan
7. Ifutfut: Fugnay, Ngifat, Lacnog, Tabuk
8. Iterkaw: Nambaran, Tabuk
9. Ifasao: Isla, Appas Tabuk
10. Ichananaw: Lacnog, Tabuk
11. Itongrayan: Luprupa, Ifunug, Amfato, Damsite, Tabuk
12. Isumacher: Sumacher, Filong, Man-ufer, Mallango, Fangad, Madopdop, Lacnog, Ipil, Bayabat, Tannubong, Bulo. Tabuk
13. Ylubuagen: Lubuagan
14. Ipinukpuk
15. Kankana-ey
16. Bagbag-o
17. Ifontok
18. Ilocano

==== Ethnic people of Mountain Province ====
1. Bontoc – Bontoc
2. Balangao – Natonin
3. Gaddang or Ga'dang/Baliwon – Paracelis
4. Kankanaey: Bauko, Besao, Sabangan, Tadian, and Sagada

=== Languages ===
The region has been called "the most diversified ethno-linguistic region in the Philippines" with the many "sub-dialect variations" of its major languages. This diversity has been attributed to the mountainous topology of the region. However, this did not lead to variations in "cultural development", and the majority of the people share a "similar cultural identity". The region has been using the Ilocano language as a lingua franca across different Igorot groups. The use of Filipino and English as the official languages of the Philippines is also implemented within the Cordillera.

- Balangao, spoken in Natonin and Paracelis, Mountain Province.
- Bontoc, spoken in Bontoc, Mountain Province.
- Ga'dang, spoken in Paracelis, Mountain Province
- Ibaloi, spoken in Benguet.
- Ifugao, spoken in Ifugao.
- Ilocano, spoken in Apayao, Abra, Kalinga, Mountain Province, Benguet, and Ifugao. It is the regional lingua franca.
- Isnag, spoken in Apayao.
- Itawis, spoken in part of Apayao
- Itneg, spoken in Abra.
- Kalinga, spoken in Kalinga, southern area of Apayao, and northern area of Mountain Province.
- Kalanguya, spoken in some parts of Benguet, Nueva Vizcaya, and Ifugao.
- Kankanaey, spoken in western Mountain Province and some parts of Benguet.

=== Religion ===
Like most other regions of the Philippines, Roman Catholicism is the single largest denomination in this region, however, a slightly lower (around 60–70% of the population) adhere to the faith, while Protestants, mostly Anglicans and Evangelicals forming a large minority at about 20–30% of the population. The traditional anitist religions maintain a significant presence in the region and are still practiced by the tribal people. There is a significant increasing members of Iglesia Ni Cristo for the landmarks like kapilyas (chapels) in each town approximately 4-6% .

== Economy ==
Poverty incidence of Cordillera Administrative Region (%)

Source: Philippine Statistics Authority

The Cordillera Administrative Region (CAR) is significant as the strategic "Watershed Cradle of North Luzon," providing the essential water and energy resources that sustain neighboring agricultural and industrial regions.

CAR consistently maintains the second-highest per capita GRDP in the Philippines (₱201,088 in 2024), trailing only the National Capital Region (NCR). The region’s economy is a critical hub for high-value services and industry, with Baguio City and Benguet alone contributing 70.3% of the region's total economic output.

The region houses 13 major river systems that feed into the irrigation networks of the Ilocos Region and Cagayan Valley. It is a primary source of renewable energy, driving major dams like Ambuklao, Binga, and San Roque, which power the entire Luzon energy grid.

CAR produces roughly 80% of the Philippines' temperate vegetables (such as lettuce, carrots, and potatoes) and is a major producer of high-quality Arabica coffee and strawberries.

It is the country’s leading producer of gold and copper, accounting for a significant portion of national mineral wealth.

The Baguio City Economic Zone is a vital center for electronics and semiconductor exports, which grew by 17% in recent years to bolster regional trade.

Home to the UNESCO World Heritage Rice Terraces of the Philippine Cordilleras, the region is a cornerstone of Philippine cultural identity and a major driver of highland tourism.

== Infrastructure ==
=== Roads and bridges ===
Approximately 98% of the region’s 2,323 km of national roads have been paved. Only two of the region's 350 bridges remain temporary. Cordillera Roads Improvement Project (CRIP) serves as the region's economic backbone, aiming to link CAR provinces via a North-South trunkline and lateral roads to Regions I and II. Tourism Road Infrastructure Program is a convergence between the DOT and DPWH that has funded over 376 km of paved roads leading to remote tourist destinations. Under programs like the Philippine Rural Development Project (PRDP), billions are invested in roads that link agricultural areas to trade centers.

- Apayao – Ilocos Norte Road – As a lateral road, the highway is a significant element of the Cordillera Roads Improvement Project (CRIP), connecting Northern Cordillera to the Ilocos Region. It traverses Apayao's Kabugao and Calanasan municipalities and turns west to Ilocos Norte's Solsona. This road project was started on January 7, 2013, and will be completed around December 2020.

=== Digital and social infrastructure ===
Programs like GovNet have established 62 operational sites in the region to provide government agencies with high-speed internet. The Pambansang Pabahay Program (4PH) has initiated groundwork for 10,000 housing units in the region to address informal settler needs.

== Culture ==
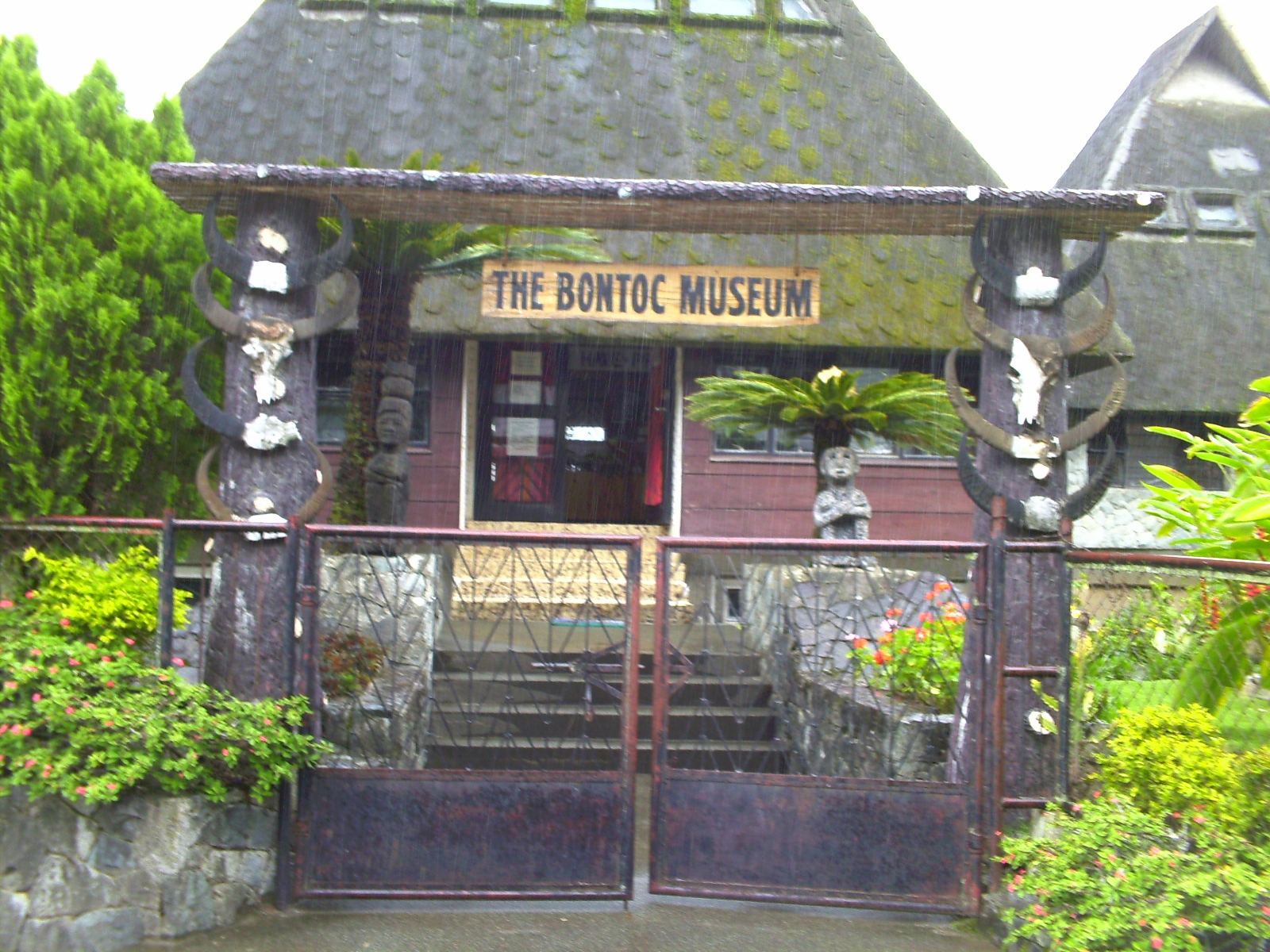
The Bontoc Museum, run by the Sisters of the Immaculate Heart of Mary, hosts many of the materials used by the different tribes of the Mountain Province.

The Cordillera region is known for its unique musical instruments including the gangsa kalinga, nose flute, bamboo flute, buzzer, bangibang, tongatong, diwdiw-as, saggeypo, and bamboo zither. The region is also known for their dance, arts, and crafts like wood-carving, ibaloi basket, loom weaving, tinalik, loinclothes called ikat, amulets, tattoo, akob, bobo, suklang and ikat weaving.

The symbol of the tattoo of the Bontocs is about being brave (because of the pain while inking), a talisman or a good luck charm against evil forces, or a symbol of a status or position (ex. Chief captain, Leader, Mayor). They also use tattoos as a decoration and clothes to their body using arts by drawing or placing inks with a pattern or abstract on their skin.

It has been observed that the people in Cordillera make arts based on their emotions and belief. They use their talents in making arts and crafts as a source of income like wood-carving, basket-weaving, weaving clothes, amulets and ikat weaving. They have different patterns in weaving and they also have their own God that is called "Bulul", it is the God of the rice that is made and worshipped by the Ifugaos. Aside from their tattoo art, the Bontocs are also known for their excellence in making different baskets for storage and rice.

The Cordillera region is popular with vibrant festivals such as the Panagbenga Festival and Lang-ay Festival. The Panagbenga Festival in Baguio highlights flower floats and street dancing while the Lang-ay Festival in Bontoc celebrates the cultural heritage, community development, and tourism of the region.

== Tourism ==
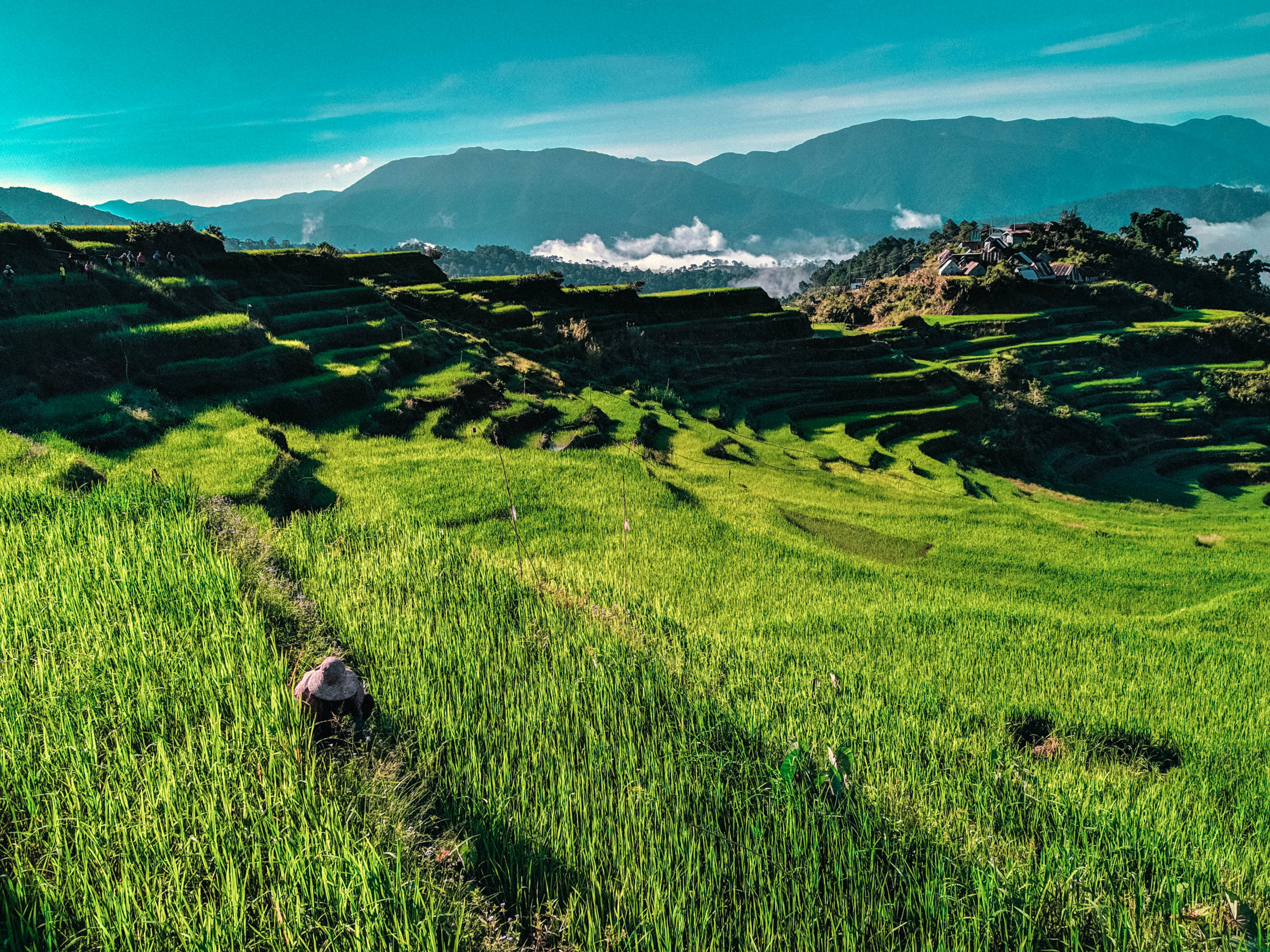
Maligcong rice terraces in Bontoc, Mountain Province

- Banaue Rice Terraces which is part of the Rice Terraces of the Philippine Cordilleras (World Heritage Site)
- Cassamata Hill National Park
- Kabayan Mummies
- Mount Data
- Balbalasang-Balbalan National Park
- Mount Pulag, the highest mountain in Luzon at 2,922 metres (9,587 ft) above sea level
- Baguio Sites which includes Burnham Park, Mines View Park, The Mansion, Lion's Head, Camp John Hay, Philippine Military Academy, Bell Church, Wright Park, Baguio Botanical Garden, and Centermall

== See also ==
- Cordillera Central (Luzon)
- Luzon tropical pine forests
- Cordillera autonomy movement
