= Bucay, Abra =

Municipality in Abra, Philippines

Bucay
- Municipality
- Municipality of Bucay
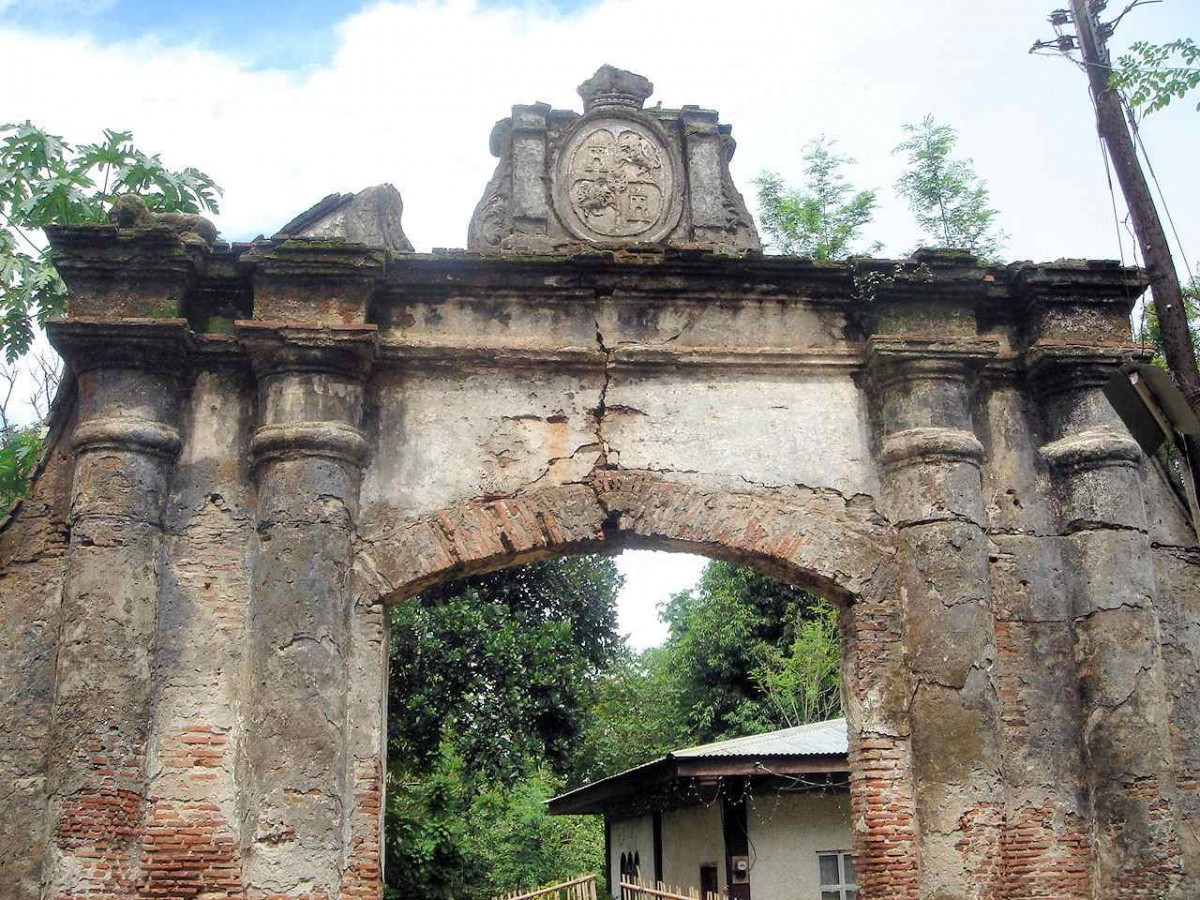
- Casa Real arch

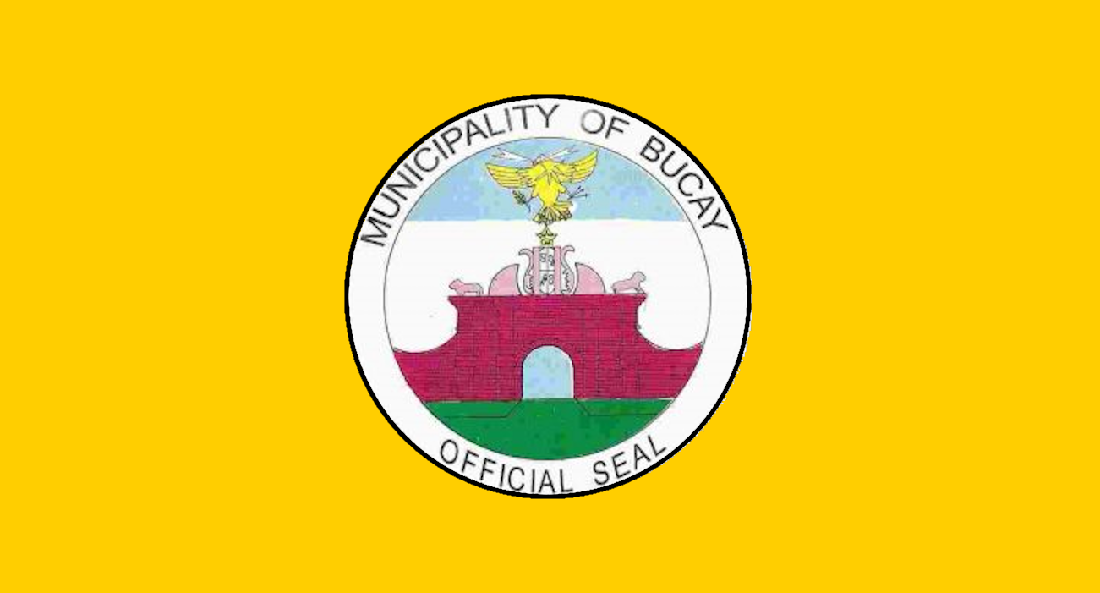
- Flag Seal

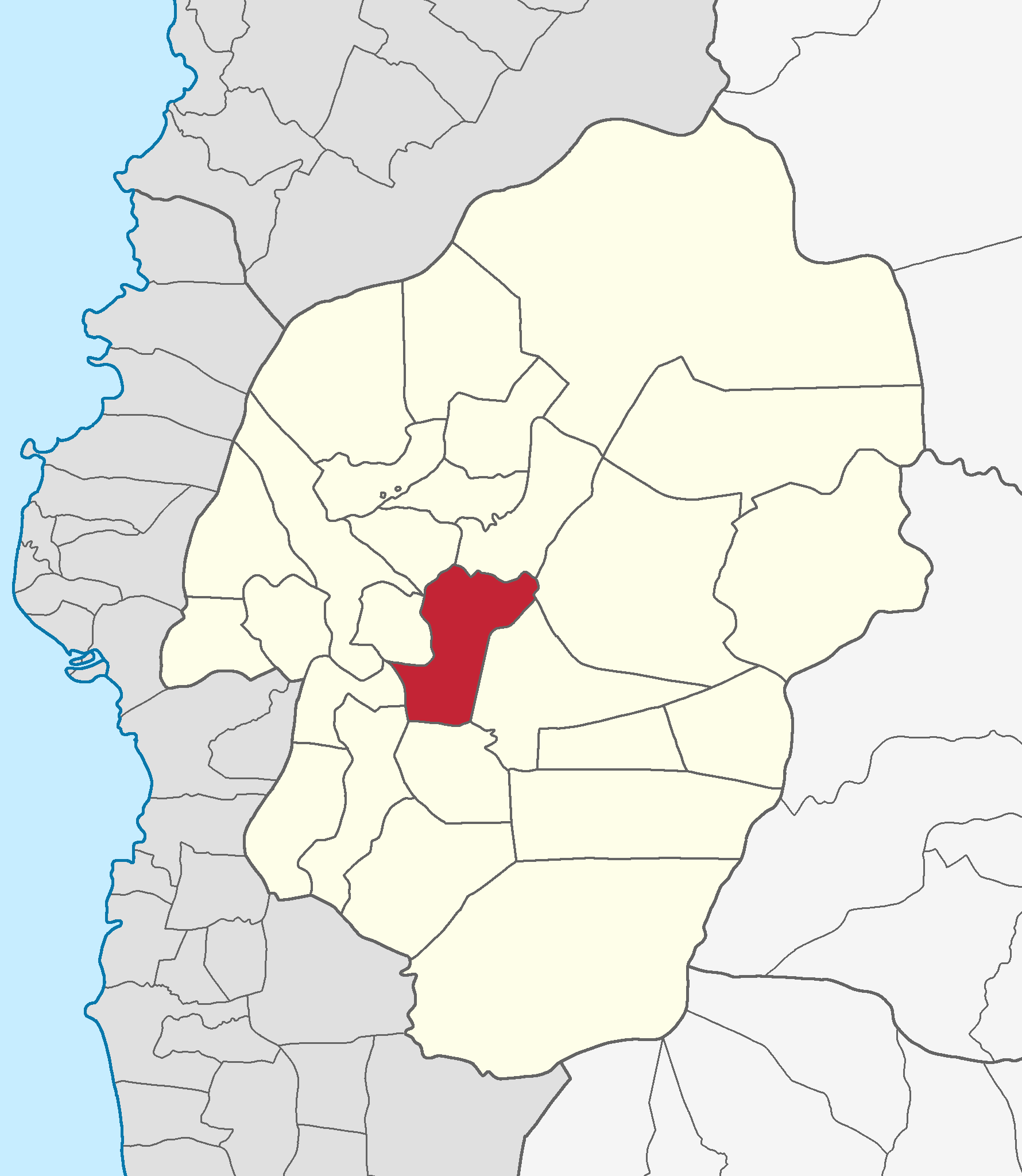
- Map of Abra with Bucay highlighted
- Interactive map of Bucay
- Location within the Philippines
- Coordinates: 17°32′N 120°43′E
- Country: Philippines
- Region: Cordillera Administrative Region
- Province: Abra
- District: Lone district
- Barangays: 21 (see Barangays)

Government
  - Type: Sangguniang Bayan
  - Mayor: Andrea Ma. Francheska B. Bernos (Lakas)
  - Vice Mayor: Judor P. Zales (Lakas)
  - Representative: Joseph Santo Niño B. Bernos
  - Municipal Council: Members: Mikhail C. Baroña; Raplh Gerald P. Bernardez; Nathan C. Bernardez; Juanito P. Zales Jr.; Julius S. Rosales; Jason A. Cantil; George B. Orquilla Jr.; Amado B. Bides
  - Electorate: 14,842 voters (2025)

Area
  - Total: 102.16 km^{2} (39.44 sq mi)
- Elevation: 172 m (564 ft)
- Highest elevation: 567 m (1,860 ft)
- Lowest elevation: 60 m (200 ft)

Population (2024 census)
  - Total: 17,775
  - Density: 173.99/km^{2} (450.64/sq mi)
  - Households: 4,339

Economy
  - Income class: 3rd municipal income class
  - Poverty incidence: 11.24% (2023)
  - Revenue: ₱ 153.1 million (2024)
  - Assets: ₱ 501.7 million (2024)
  - Expenditure: ₱ 93.4 million (2024)
  - Liabilities: ₱ 67.26 million (2024)

Service provider
  - Electricity: Abra Electric Cooperative (ABRECO)
- Time zone: UTC+8 (PST)
- ZIP code: 2805
- PSGC: 1400103000
- IDD : area code: +63 (0)74
- Native languages: Itneg, Ilocano, Filipino

Bucay, officially the Municipality of Bucay (Ilocano: Ili ti Bucay; Filipino: Bayan ng Bucay), is a municipality in the province of Abra, Philippines. According to the 2024 census, it has a population of 17,775 people.

== Etymology ==
There are two accounts regarding how the town of Bucay got its name. According to one version, the town was named after a tribal leader called Bucay. As a young man, while patrolling, he came across a young woman lying along the path and helped her, eventually bringing her home. Over time, he fell in love with her and married her. On several occasions, the woman would mysteriously disappear, and Bucay would sometimes see her sitting alone at the corner of his bamboo hut with her head bowed. Whenever he approached to touch her, she vanished again.

== History ==
=== Early history ===
Before the Spanish Colonization, the place had become the footfalls of invading headhunters from the dense jungles of the Cordillera range.

=== Spanish colonization era ===
Bucay was established on October 29, 1846, and the first settlers were Itnegs. It became the first provincial capital of Abra when the military form of government was set up in May 1847.

At the back of the present municipal hall is the centuries-old façade of the ruined Casa Real (Provincial Capitol Building). Across the town plaza, stand the centuries-old Catholic church, convent and learning school, the Spanish structure house owned by then Don Teodoro Arias who served as Gobernadorcillo of Bucay in 1862 and the old American structure house which was built in 1908 and owned by then US Corporal Ernest D. Smith who served the Spanish–American War and the Filipino-American war from 1896 to 1901.

== Geography ==
Among the twenty-seven (27) towns of Abra, Bucay is the most centrally located, situated at 17°32′N 120°43′E. It is bounded on the north by the towns of Tayum and Lagangilang, on the south by Manabo, on the east by Licuan-Baay and Sallapadan, and on the west by Peñarrubia, Bangued and Villaviciosa.

According to the Philippine Statistics Authority, the municipality has a land area of 102.16 square kilometres (39.44 sq mi) constituting 2.45% of the 4,165.25-square-kilometre- (1,608.21 sq mi) total area of Abra.

Bucay is situated 17.31 kilometres (10.76 mi) from the provincial capital Bangued, and 418.28 kilometres (259.91 mi) from the country's capital city of Manila.

=== Barangays ===
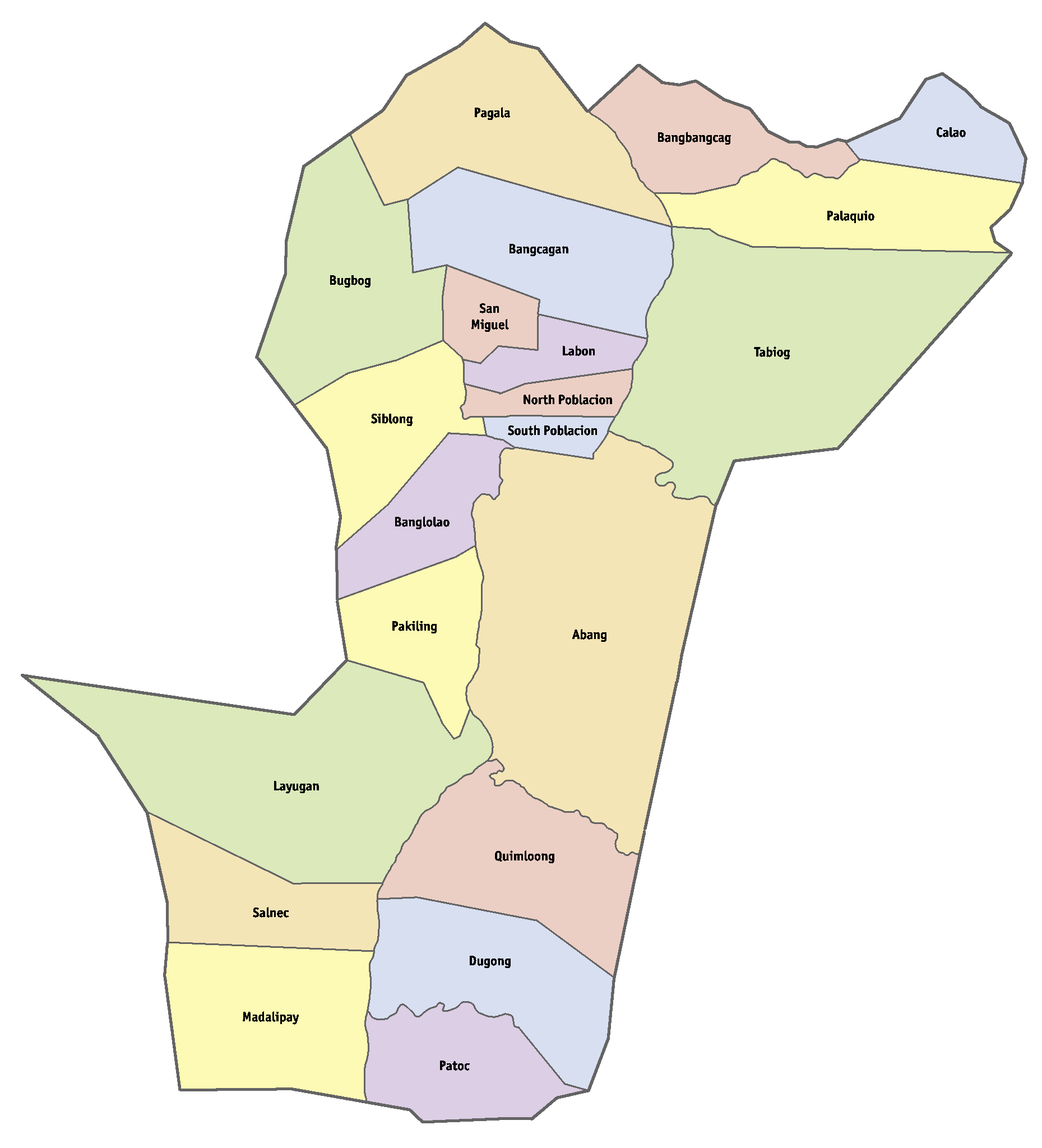
Political map of Bucay

Bucay is politically subdivided into 21 barangays. Each barangay consists of puroks and some have sitios.

PSGC	Barangay	Population			±% p.a.	
		2024		2010		
140103001	Abang	4.3%	766	820	▾	−0.47%
140103002	Bangbangcag	6.5%	1,156	1,088	▴	0.42%
140103003	Bangcagan	3.7%	658	616	▴	0.45%
140103004	Banglolao	3.3%	590	598	▾	−0.09%
140103005	Bugbog	4.2%	754	698	▴	0.53%
140103006	Calao	4.4%	790	721	▴	0.63%
140103007	Dugong	9.2%	1,628	1,532	▴	0.42%
140103008	Labon	4.2%	748	632	▴	1.16%
140103009	Layugan	5.9%	1,053	1,002	▴	0.34%
140103010	Madalipay	2.1%	376	369	▴	0.13%
140103016	North Poblacion	6.6%	1,175	1,123	▴	0.31%
140103011	Pagala	6.7%	1,184	1,262	▾	−0.44%
140103013	Pakiling	4.5%	799	708	▴	0.83%
140103012	Palaquio	6.0%	1,063	994	▴	0.46%
140103014	Patoc	3.8%	671	787	▾	−1.09%
140103018	Quimloong	2.9%	514	526	▾	−0.16%
140103019	Salnec	2.0%	357	370	▾	−0.25%
140103020	San Miguel	4.9%	874	653	▴	2.02%
140103021	Siblong	5.8%	1,036	972	▴	0.44%
140103017	South Poblacion	3.5%	623	579	▴	0.50%
140103022	Tabiog	6.4%	1,138	1,076	▴	0.39%
	Total		17,775	17,953	▾	−0.07%

=== Climate ===
Climate data for Bucay, Abra
Month	Jan	Feb	Mar	Apr	May	Jun	Jul	Aug	Sep	Oct	Nov	Dec	Year
Mean daily maximum °C (°F)	27 (81)	28 (82)	30 (86)	32 (90)	31 (88)	31 (88)	30 (86)	30 (86)	30 (86)	29 (84)	38 (100)	27 (81)	30 (87)
Mean daily minimum °C (°F)	19 (66)	19 (66)	20 (68)	22 (72)	24 (75)	25 (77)	24 (75)	24 (75)	24 (75)	22 (72)	21 (70)	20 (68)	22 (72)
Average precipitation mm (inches)	24 (0.9)	26 (1.0)	25 (1.0)	43 (1.7)	159 (6.3)	180 (7.1)	204 (8.0)	207 (8.1)	183 (7.2)	185 (7.3)	91 (3.6)	67 (2.6)	1,394 (54.8)
Average rainy days	4.6	4.0	6.2	9.1	19.5	23.2	24.0	22.5	21.5	15.2	10.5	6.0	166.3
Source: Meteoblue

== Demographics ==
Population census of Bucay
Year	Pop.	±% p.a.
1903	4,483	—
1918	5,653	+1.56%
1939	5,570	−0.07%
1948	6,215	+1.22%
1960	7,473	+1.55%
1970	9,937	+2.89%
1975	11,337	+2.68%
1980	12,375	+1.77%
1990	13,346	+0.76%
1995	14,499	+1.56%
2000	14,881	+0.56%
2007	16,266	+1.23%
2010	17,126	+1.89%
2015	17,115	−0.01%
2020	17,953	+1.01%
2024	17,775	−0.24%
Source: Philippine Statistics Authority

In the 2024 census, Bucay had a population of 17,775 people. The population density was 170 inhabitants per square kilometre (440/sq mi).

== Economy ==
Poverty incidence of Bucay (%)

Source: Philippine Statistics Authority

Bucay is renowned for its traditional cacao production, which dates back to 1847. The Banglolao Women's Association is a leading producer of native cacao tablea, chocomani, and chocoyema, providing significant livelihood for local families. Beyond cacao, the town produces staple crops including rice, corn, and root crops. It is also part of the province's broader production of tobacco, coffee, and sugarcane. Local artisans engage in traditional crafts such as bamboo and rattan weaving, which are prominent industries across Abra. Farmers raise cattle, swine, and poultry, while river-based fishing in the Abra River and small-scale tilapia farming contribute to the local food supply.

== Government ==
=== Local government ===
Bucay, belonging to the lone congressional district of the province of Abra, is governed by a mayor designated as its local chief executive and by a municipal council as its legislative body in accordance with the Local Government Code. The mayor, vice mayor, and the councilors are elected directly by the people through an election which is being held every three years.

=== Elected officials ===
Members of the Municipal Council (2025–2028)
Position	Name
Congressman	Joseph Santo Niño B. Bernos
Mayor	Andrea Ma. Francheska B. Bernos
Vice-Mayor	Judor P. Zales
Councilors	Juanito P. Zales, Jr.
Councilors	Ralph Gerald P. Bernardez
Councilors	Nathan C. Bernardez
Councilors	Mikhail C. Baroña
Councilors	Julius S. Rosales
Councilors	Jason A. Cantil
Councilors	George B. Orquilla, Jr.
Councilors	Amado B. Bides

== Education ==
The Bucay Schools District Office governs all educational institutions within the municipality. It oversees the management and operations of all private and public, from primary to secondary schools.

=== Primary and elementary schools ===
- Abang Elementary School
- Bangbangcag Primary School
- Bangcagan Primary School
- Bucay Central School
- Bucay North Elementary School
- Bugbog Elementary School
- Calao Elementary School
- Dugong Elementary School
- Lublubnac Primary School
- Madalipay Elementary School
- Pagala East Primary School
- Pagala West Elementary School
- Patoc Elementary School
- Quimloong Elementary School
- Siwasiw Elementary School
- Tabiog Elementary School

=== Secondary schools ===
- Cristina B. Gonzales Memorial High School
- Dugong National High School
- Layugan Integrated School
- Our Lady of Fatima Preschool
- Pangtod National High School
