= Baguio City Economic Zone =

Manufacturing special economic zone in Cordillera Administrative Region, the Philippines

Coordinates: 16°22′47″N 120°37′05″E

Baguio City Economic Zone is a manufacturing special economic zone (MSEZ) located in the city of Baguio in the Cordillera Administrative Region. It is operated by the Philippine Economic Zone Authority (PEZA), an agency in charge of developing and operating special economic zones in the Philippines. It has a total area of 1,162,497 square metres (116.2497 ha) and 31 locators as of February 2024. As of 2021, the zone's biggest exports were radio, television and communication equipment; and transport equipment.

The zone was established in 1979 as the Baguio Export Processing Zone by President Ferdinand Marcos through Proclamation No. 1825. It initially had an area of 530,616 square metres (53.0616 ha). Its first and prime locator is the American semiconductor manufacturer Texas Instruments. In 2006, the plant accounted for 40% of the company's global sales and employed 2,200 people in Baguio.

In 2007, PEZA and the Bases Conversion and Development Authority through its subsidiary, John Hay Management Corporation, signed a 25-year lease agreement wherein the former would develop a 65,253 square metres (6.5253 ha) area of Camp John Hay owned by the latter. By 2010, 4.8 hectares of that were leased to Moog Controls Corporation.

In 2008, President Gloria Macapagal Arroyo signed Proclamation No. 1561 which expanded the zone to include a 48,270 square metres (4.827 ha) portion of Camp John Hay.

As of 2022, there are plants to install a 10-megawatt solar facility within the economic zone.

== See also ==
- Cagayan Special Economic Zone
- Cavite Economic Zone
