= Villaviciosa, Abra =

Municipality in Abra, Philippines

Villaviciosa
- Municipality
- Municipality of Villaviciosa
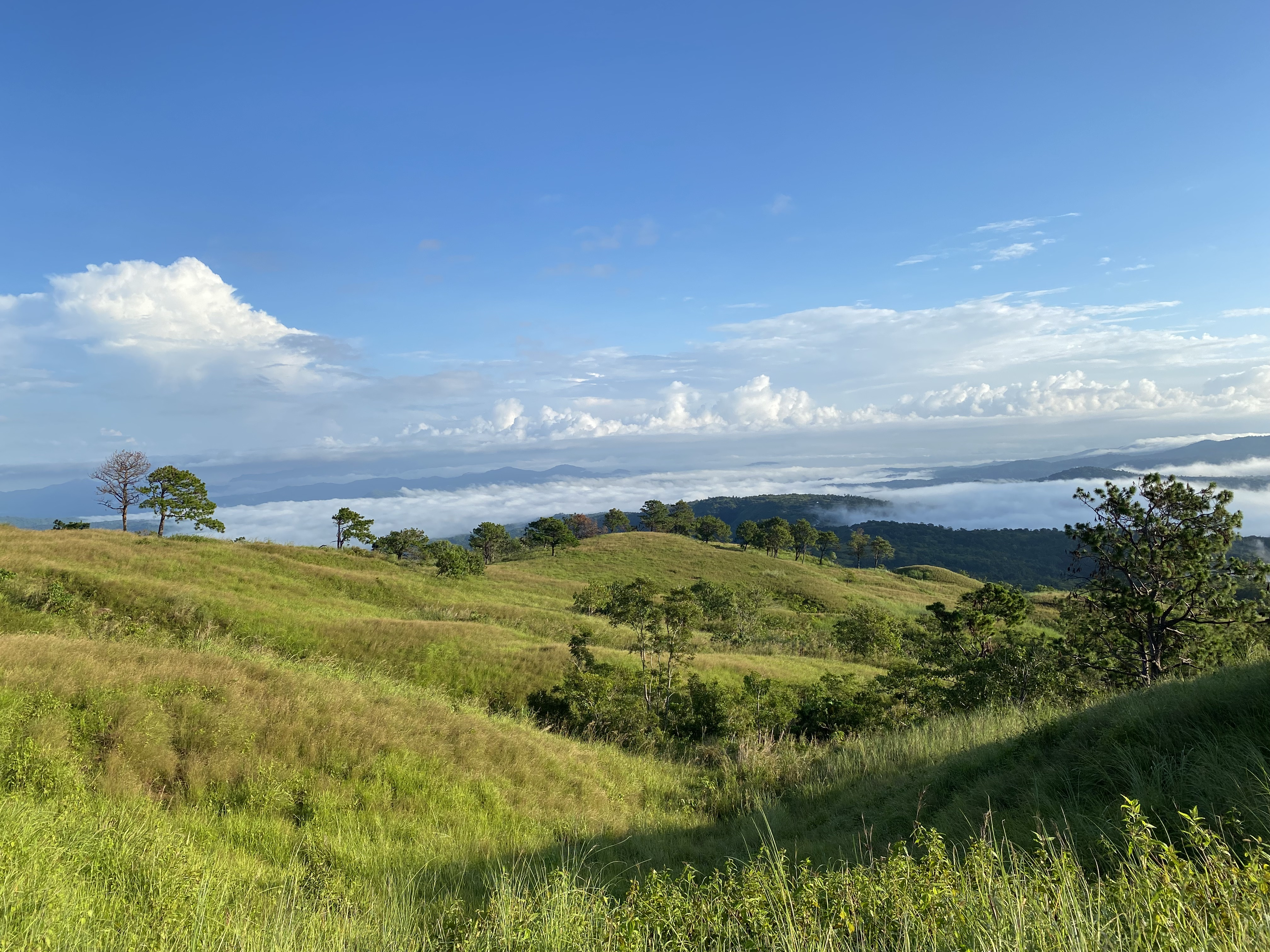
- View from the Palayan View Deck

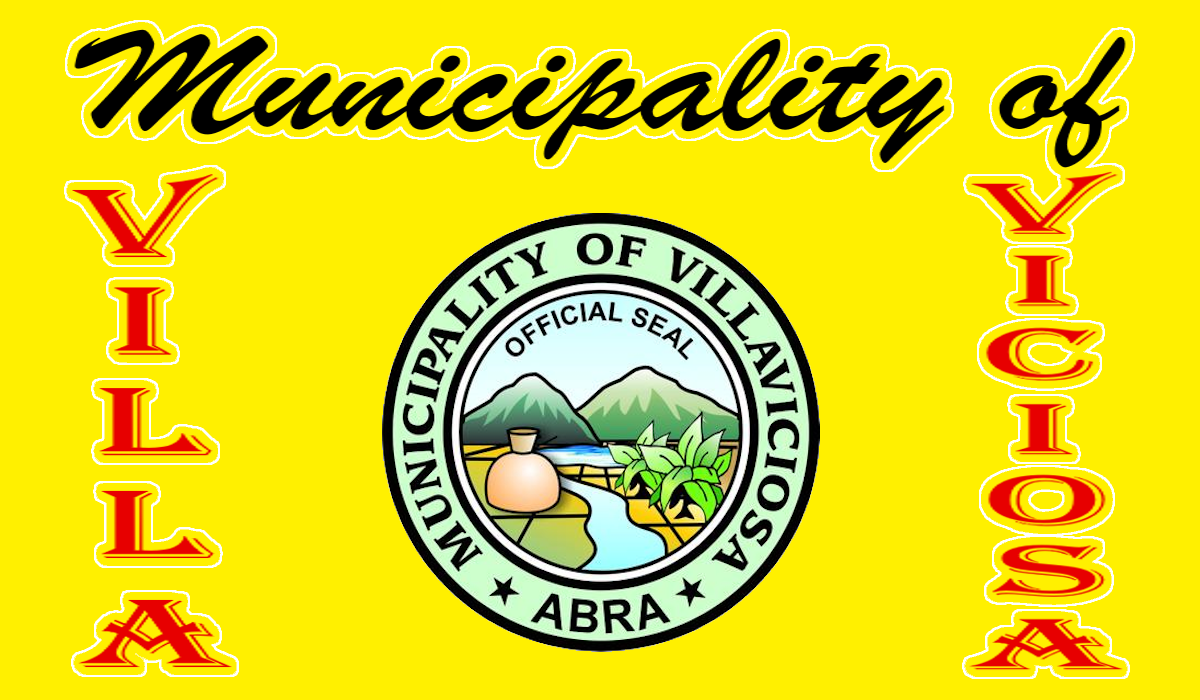
- Flag

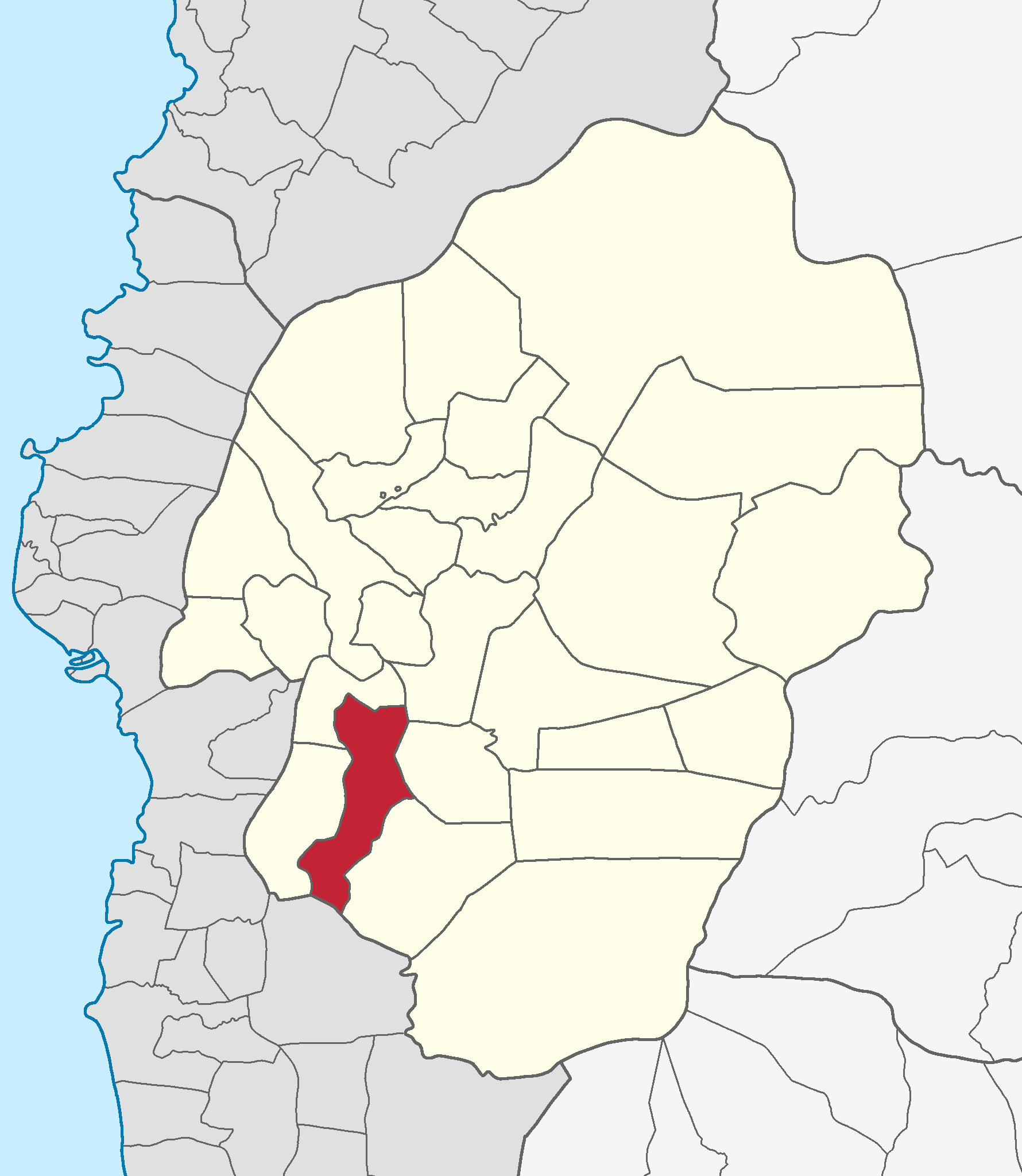
- Map of Abra with Villaviciosa highlighted
- Interactive map of Villaviciosa
- Location within the Philippines
- Coordinates: 17°26′N 120°38′E
- Country: Philippines
- Region: Cordillera Administrative Region
- Province: Abra
- District: Lone district
- Barangays: 8 (see Barangays)

Government
  - Type: Sangguniang Bayan
  - Mayor: Marjorie L. Lagen
  - Vice Mayor: Jose W. Lagen Jr.
  - Representative: Joseph Santo Niño B. Bernos
  - Municipal Council: Members: Leo S. Sabaot; Celia B. Oydoc; Daniel P. Cayabo; Nixon B. Belmes; Felicisimo C. Pescozo; Floro G. Fontanilla Jr.; Benjore Guideon G. Asia; Ernest G. Binnong
  - Electorate: 4,302 voters (2025)

Area
  - Total: 102.93 km^{2} (39.74 sq mi)
- Elevation: 325 m (1,066 ft)
- Highest elevation: 667 m (2,188 ft)
- Lowest elevation: 126 m (413 ft)

Population (2024 census)
  - Total: 5,674
  - Density: 55.12/km^{2} (142.8/sq mi)
  - Households: 1,367

Economy
  - Income class: 1st municipal income class
  - Poverty incidence: 6.44% (2023)
  - Revenue: ₱ 547.3 million (2022)
  - Assets: ₱ 1,028 million (2022)
  - Expenditure: ₱ 422.3 million (2022)
  - Liabilities: ₱ 35.95 million (2022)

Service provider
  - Electricity: Abra Electric Cooperative (ABRECO)
- Time zone: UTC+8 (PST)
- ZIP code: 2811
- PSGC: 1400127000
- IDD : area code: +63 (0)74
- Native languages: Itneg; Atta; Ilocano; Tagalog

Villaviciosa, officially the Municipality of Villaviciosa (Ilocano: Ili ti Villaviciosa; Maeng Itneg: Ili di Villaviciosa; Tagalog: Bayan ng Villaviciosa), is a municipality in the province of Abra, Philippines. According to the 2024 census, it has a population of 5,674 people.

The town is known for the Kimkimay Lake, a reminder of the wrath of the gods against people who have numerous vices.

== History ==
During the Spanish era, Villaviciosa was once called 'Kalaw', which was derived from its first settler, 'Agcalaw', who was from Ananaaw (now Gregorio del Pilar, Ilocos Sur).

In 1904, Villaviciosa was separated from the town of Pilar, and eventually became a municipality in 1917. During World War II, on 8 December 1941, the people of Villaviciosa evacuated from the town towards the hinterlands. Sometime in December 1942, Japanese forces arrived in the town and ordered everyone to return to their homes. However guerrilla activity remained prevalent. By 1944, almost all men had joined the resistance against the Japanese. In one incident, Japanese forces were ambushed at a bridge near the south of the town, which then led to harsh Japanese reprisals against the innocent civilians.

== Geography ==
According to the Philippine Statistics Authority, the municipality has a land area of 102.93 square kilometres (39.74 sq mi) constituting 2.47% of the 4,165.25-square-kilometre- (1,608.21 sq mi) total area of Abra. Villaviciosa is located at 17°26′N 120°38′E.

The municipality is geographically situated at the southern portion of Abra, bounded in the north-west by San Isidro, north by Bucay, east by Manabo and Luba, south by San Emilio, and west by Pilar.

The town is accessible from Benguet by land transportation through the Abra-Ilocos Sur Road, the more frequently used route. From the nearby province of Ilocos Sur, it is also accessible through the Candon via San Emilio to Luba‑Tamac, Villaviciosa Road and the Santa Maria‑Burgos via Pilar‑Villaviciosa Road.

Villavicios is situated 22.42 kilometres (13.93 mi) from the provincial capital Bangued, and 428.27 kilometres (266.11 mi) from the country's capital city of Manila.

=== Climate ===
Climate data for Villaviciosa, Abra
Month	Jan	Feb	Mar	Apr	May	Jun	Jul	Aug	Sep	Oct	Nov	Dec	Year
Mean daily maximum °C (°F)	29 (84)	30 (86)	31 (88)	33 (91)	31 (88)	30 (86)	29 (84)	29 (84)	29 (84)	30 (86)	30 (86)	29 (84)	30 (86)
Mean daily minimum °C (°F)	18 (64)	18 (64)	20 (68)	22 (72)	24 (75)	24 (75)	23 (73)	23 (73)	23 (73)	21 (70)	20 (68)	18 (64)	21 (70)
Average precipitation mm (inches)	10 (0.4)	10 (0.4)	14 (0.6)	23 (0.9)	80 (3.1)	103 (4.1)	121 (4.8)	111 (4.4)	119 (4.7)	114 (4.5)	39 (1.5)	15 (0.6)	759 (30)
Average rainy days	5.2	3.9	6.2	9.1	18.5	21.4	22.9	19.8	19.8	16.2	10.5	6.1	159.6
Source: Meteoblue

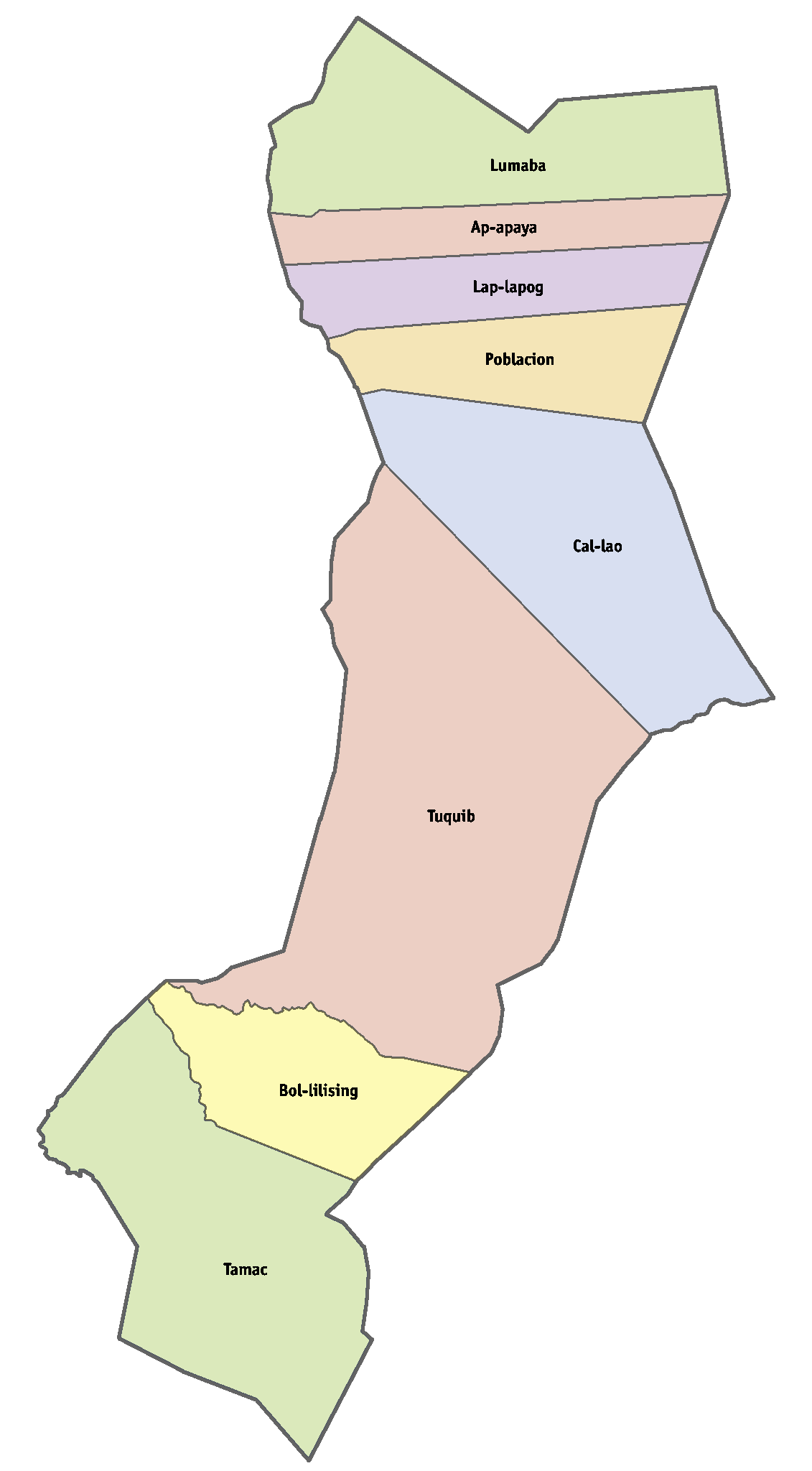
Political map of Villaviciosa

=== Barangays ===
Villaviciosa is politically subdivided into 8 barangays. Each barangay consists of puroks and some have sitios.

PSGC	Barangay	Population			±% p.a.	
		2024		2010		
140127001	Ap-apaya	9.6%	542	531	▴	0.14%
140127002	Bol-lilising	5.0%	283	294	▾	−0.26%
140127003	Cal-lao	16.6%	940	931	▴	0.07%
140127004	Lap-lapog	16.1%	916	766	▴	1.25%
140127005	Lumaba	9.8%	558	552	▴	0.07%
140127006	Poblacion	15.8%	897	836	▴	0.49%
140127007	Tamac	11.9%	678	627	▴	0.54%
140127008	Tuquib	15.2%	861	840	▴	0.17%
	Total		5,674	5,675	▾	0.00%

== Demographics ==
Population census of Villaviciosa
Year	Pop.	±% p.a.
1918	1,621	—
1939	2,574	+2.23%
1948	2,474	−0.44%
1960	3,194	+2.15%
1970	4,006	+2.29%
1975	3,865	−0.72%
1980	3,933	+0.35%
1990	4,612	+1.61%
1995	4,634	+0.09%
2000	4,877	+1.10%
2007	5,147	+0.75%
2010	5,377	+1.60%
2015	5,392	+0.05%
2020	5,675	+1.08%
2024	5,674	−0.00%
Source: Philippine Statistics Authority

In the 2024 census, Villaviciosa had a population of 5,674 people. The population density was 55 inhabitants per square kilometre (140/sq mi).

== Economy ==
Poverty incidence of Villaviciosa (%)

Source: Philippine Statistics Authority

The main source of economy in Villaviciosa is agriculture. The major agricultural staples of Villaviciosa are rice and tobacco cultivation. Another source of economy in the municipality is aquaculture through targeted programs.

== Government ==
=== Local government ===
Villaviciosa, belonging to the lone congressional district of the province of Abra, is governed by a mayor designated as its local chief executive and by a municipal council as its legislative body in accordance with the Local Government Code. The mayor, vice mayor, and the councilors are elected directly by the people through an election which is being held every three years.

=== Elected officials ===
Members of the Municipal Council (2025–2028)
Position	Name
Congressman	Joseph Santo Niño B. Bernos
Mayor	Marjorie L. Lagen
Vice-Mayor	Jose W. Lagen Jr.
Councilors	Leo S. Sabaot
Councilors	Daniel P. Cayabo
Councilors	Celia B. Oydoc
Councilors	Felicisimo C. Pescozo
Councilors	Nixon B. Belmes
Councilors	Floro G. Fontanilla, Jr.
Councilors	Benjore Guideon G. Asia
Councilors	Ernest G. Binnong

== Education ==
The Villaviciosa Schools District Office governs all educational institutions within the municipality. It oversees the management and operations of all private and public, from primary to secondary schools.

=== Primary and elementary schools ===
- Bol-lilising Elementary School
- Cal-lao Elementary School
- Lagaosian Elementary School
- Tamac Elementary School
- Villaviciosa Central School

=== Secondary schools ===
- Lumaba Integrated School
- Tuquib Integrated School
