= Sagada (disambiguation) =

Sagada is a municipality in Mountain Province, Philippines.

Sagada may also refer to:

- Sagada language, a language spoken in Northern Luzon
- Mount Sagada, a mountain in the Philippines 8°12′0″N 124°25′0″E
- Sagada, Russia, several rural localities in Russia
- Sagada, Togo, a place in Togo 7°3′0″N 1°30′0″E
- Sagada orange, a variety of orange grown in the Cordillera region in the Philippines
- Sagada coffee, a variety of coffee beans grown in the Cordillera region in the Philippines
