= Kahawa Sug =

Variety of Philippine coffee plant

- Species: Coffea canephora
- Cultivar: Kahawa Sug
- Origin: Sulu Archipelago, Philippines

Kahawa Sūg, also known as Sulu coffee or Sulu robusta, is a single-origin coffee varietal grown by the Tausug people of the Sulu Archipelago, Philippines. It is a robusta cultivar, belonging to the species Coffea canephora. It originates from robusta plants introduced to Sulu in the 1860s. It is an important part of traditional Tausug culture. It is mostly consumed locally, though it has started being exported more widely in recent years. It is currently endangered by the introduction of modern higher yield coffee varieties.

== History ==
Kahawa Sūg has a unique origin, in comparison to other traditional coffee varieties in the Philippines. Robusta coffee was introduced to the Sulu archipelago in the 1860s by Herman Leopold Schück, a Prussian merchant mariner originally from Upper Silesia. Schück had become a close friend to the ruler of the Sulu Sultanate, Sultan Jamalul Alam. He eventually became a blood brother to the Sultan through blood compact and decided to settle in the Philippines. He established a plantation of robusta coffee in the village of Lukut Lapas (now barangay Anuling, Patikul, Sulu) with 20,000 plants. Cultivation spread to the locals and the coffee became known as kahawa Sūg. It literally means "Sulu coffee", from Arabic قهوة, qahwah ("coffee"), and Sūg ("sea currents"), the native Tausug name for the Sulu archipelago.

== Cultural significance ==
Kahawa Sūg is an important part of Tausug culture in Sulu. It is the traditional accompaniment to bangbang (merienda snacks) or latal (a platter with a variety of native dishes). It is usually served with an extra empty glass, so the hot coffee can be poured back and forth to cool while swirling it at the same time and releasing the aroma. The coffee is described as being non-acidic and not too bitter.

Kahawa Sūg are sold in Muslim communities in the Philippines in kahawahan, the native coffee shops. It is usually taken black.

== Cultivation ==
Kahawa Sūg is widely grown in Sulu, producing around 7,300 metric tons each year because of Sulu's naturally fertile soil. However, it is mostly consumed locally in Mindanao and rarely exported because of the problems brought by the conflict in Muslim Mindanao in recent decades. Most Filipinos outside of Mindanao are unaware that Sulu even has a native coffee variety. Coffee are traditionally harvested by hand, plucking individual ripe red berries, as opposed to the modern methods of harvesting robusta where the branches are stripped entirely. Kahawa Sūg are traditionally soaked in water before being depulped, then washed again and fermented overnight before rinsing and drying.

In recent years, the ARMM branch of the Department of Agrarian Reform has started investing in local coffee farmers through the ARCCESS Project (Agrarian Reform Community Connectivity and Economic Support Services). They provide training, equipment, and funds. In 2017, 10 metric tons of Kahawa Sūg were purchased by the Filipino company, Universal Robina Corporation.

A notable leader in local coffee growers is Kumalah Sug-Elardo, a full-blooded Tausug princess (Putlih) and a descendant of the two Royal houses of Sulu. She is often dubbed as the "Coffee Princess". She founded and leads the People's Alliance for Progress Multipurpose Cooperative (PAP-MPC) in 2009, with the goal of improving the livelihoods of the people in the conflict-torn region.

Kahawa Sūg is also used to make kahawa kubing, a local civet coffee.

== Conservation ==
Kahawa Sūg is listed in the Ark of Taste international catalogue of endangered heritage foods by the Slow Food movement. It is threatened by modern higher yield fast-growing coffee cultivars that are being introduced to Sulu.

== See also ==
- Benguet coffee
- Barako coffee
- Sagada coffee
- Tsokolate
