= Benguet coffee =

Variety of coffee plant

- Type: Coffee
- Origin: Cordillera, Northern Philippines
- Introduced: Mid-19th century
- Related products: Kona coffee and Jamaican Blue Mountain Coffee

Benguet coffee, also known as Benguet arabica, is a single-origin coffee varietal grown in the Cordillera highlands of the northern Philippines since the 19th century. It belongs to the species Coffea arabica, of the Typica variety. It is one of the main crops of farmers in the province of Benguet, which has a climate highly suitable for arabica cultivation. Benguet coffee is listed in the Ark of Taste international catalogue of endangered heritage foods by the Slow Food movement.

== History ==
Arabica coffee is believed to have been introduced to the Cordillera highlands in the mid-19th century. According to William F. Pack, an American governor of Benguet (1909–1912) during the American colonial period, arabica coffee was first introduced to the Cordilleras in 1875 by a Spanish military governor of Benguet, Manuel Scheidnegal y Sera. He initially planted them in government gardens in the lowlands of the province to evaluate their potential as a regional crop. However, frequent rains and the low altitude were not ideal conditions for the plants. The next governor, Enrique Oraa, had greater success when he transplanted them at higher altitudes in 1877 and distributed seedlings among the native Igorot people. In 1881 however, the then governor, a certain Villena, attempted to coerce the natives into growing coffee by ordering them to do so. In protest, native communities destroyed arabica plantations at the advice of village elders.

However, a native chief named Camising from Kabayan purportedly saw the benefits of the crop and introduced arabica coffee to his own people. His successes convinced neighboring communities to take up coffee cultivation on their own. Benguet coffee was part of the booming coffee industry of the Philippines during the 1880s and 1890s, which reached annual coffee exports of up to 16 million pounds. However, coffee rust devastated the plantations in 1899 and coffee production plummeted. By 1917, annual total export of coffee from the Philippines only amounted to around 3,000 pounds.

Pack praised Benguet coffee even then for its flavor and spearheaded a plan to rehabilitate the industry while he was governor. However, his efforts and that of the American colonial government failed.

== Cultivation ==
Benguet coffee cultivation is centered in the province of Benguet, mostly in backyard or small-scale farms. The coffee they produced were both for local consumption and sold as luxury exports to Spain, where they fetched high prices. The coffee industry flourished in the mid-20th century as demand increased. But it faltered in the 1990s due to rapidly rising inflation and government neglect, resulting in farmers shifting to other crops like corn.

In recent years, provincial governments are attempting to bring back coffee production for both local and international markets. Production has steadily increased since 2010. In 2016, the Department of Trade and Industry in Cordillera launched a shared service facility and laboratory for processing and cupping arabica in the Benguet State University, the first in the country. Benguet is regarded as the top producer of quality arabica coffee in the Philippines and is in high demand.

The Philippine coffee roadmap, which is the blue print of the country's coffee industry, aims to put the Philippines' coffee sufficiency level at 161% by the year 2022. To be able to reach this goal, production volume has to increase by 145, 969.79 metric tons, production area has to expand by 99,879 hectares, and productivity will have to increase by 0.50 MT to make it 1 MT per hectare. In the Cordillera region coffee production is pegged to be at 3,735.86 MT of green beans coming from 6,322 hectares production area.

Benguet coffee is characterized as having an acidity comparable to Hawaiian Kona coffee and Jamaican Blue Mountain coffee. Benguet coffee is listed in the Ark of Taste international catalogue of endangered heritage foods by the Slow Food movement.

== See also ==
- Barako coffee
- Sagada coffee
- Sulu coffee
- Tsokolate
