= Bede Frost =

Anglican priest, monk and spiritual writer

Albert Ernest Frost (name in religion Brother Bede Frost OSB ) (13 November 1875 – 29 April 1961) was an English Anglican priest who was persecuted for Anglo-Catholic practices in Australia. He subsequently returned to England and became an Anglican Benedictine and a noted spiritual writer.

== Early life ==
Frost was born in 1875 in Long Ditton, Surrey, to Thomas Frost and his wife Elizabeth (née Luckin). He was educated at Barnsley Modern School.

== Early clerical career ==
By 1898 Frost was working at St John the Baptist in Spalding, and the following year he was appointed lay reader. He was ordained deacon in 1900 and priest in 1901, both times by the saintly Anglo-Catholic Edward King.

He served his title at St Paul's, Eastville with St Peter's, Midville (1901-1902) and St Mary and All Saints, Palfrey (1903-1910). He then travelled to Fiji and was Vicar of Holy Redeemer, Levuka (1911-1913), during which time he installed the high altar (carved by a Canadian sculptor named Le Francoeur) as a memorial to his predecessor, the Rev William Floyd. At the same time, the Chief Justice of Fiji, Sir Charles Major presented an altar-cross and candlesticks. After his wife died in 1913, Frost then moved to Australia and was Priest-in-Charge of the Broken Hill Railway Town and the Gaol (1913-1914) and then Vicar of Broken Hill itself (1914-1915). During this time he established and was the Superior of the Brotherhood of the Holy Redeemer.

== Persecution and trial for heresy ==
On 6 August 1915 he was cited to appear before Dr Anderson, the Bishop of Riverina, on charges of false doctrine, having taught his confirmation candidates to make confession to a priest before taking communion, invocation of the Blessed Virgin Mary and the Saints, and other 'Romish' practices such as describing the main Sunday service as High Mass. This was reputedly the only Anglican heresy trial to take place in Australia. Although acquitted of heresy, under pressure from the Bishop, Frost felt obliged to resign.

== Later career and life in religion ==
After resigning as Vicar of Broken Hill, Frost was summoned to serve in the Episcopal Church in the Philippines by Bishop Charles Brent Initially Frost was a missionary at Bontoc (1915-1917) and then as the assistant priest to the Rev John Staunton at St Mary the Virgin, Sagada. St Mary's, Sagada was notoriously Anglo-Catholic under Fr Staunton's leadership, but Frost introduced a number of additional new devotions: the proper observance of Candlemas and Corpus Christi, May devotions to the Blessed Virgin Mary, June devotions in honour of the Sacred Heart, November intercessions for the Holy Souls, and Benediction of the Blessed Sacrament as a regular feature of Sunday worship. In 1918 Bishop Brent was translated to a diocese in New York, and jurisdiction of the Philippines was transferred to Bishop Graves of Shanghai. Graves undertook a visitation in November 1918, and held the singing of hymns before the Reserved Sacrament and the statue of the Virgin to be illegal. He issued a directive, prohibiting such veneration. Despite threats to resign, Staunton and Frost remained in post, and the practices of Sagada continued. However, the appointment of Brent's successor, Frank Mosher, led to a final row: in September 1924 the Bishop invited the Chaplain of Brent School to open the communion rail to non-Episcopalians. Staunton declared this to be a "Pan-Protestant virus", and both he and Frost resigned at the end of 1924.

On Frost's return to England, he was appointed an assistant priest under Fr Henry Ross at St Alban's, Holborn (1925-1926), before going to India where he was Chaplain at Dibrugarh (1926-1927) and Chittagong (1927-1928). Some time after 1928 (but by at least 1931) he was professed as an Anglican Benedictine at Nashdom Abbey, taking the name Bede as his name in religion. In 1933 he was the preacher at an early pilgrimage to the Shrine of Our Lady of Walsingham. In the late 1930s he lived in the clergy house at St Saviour's Church, Ealing; the church itself (but not the clergy house) was bombed in 1940, and after that his final post was as Chaplain to the Society of St Margaret in East Grinstead (1940-1957).

== Published works ==
Frost wrote widely, under the name Bede Frost.

- The Art of Mental Prayer (1931: Philip Allen)
- A Retreat for Layfolk (1931: Philip Allan)
- Priesthood and Prayer (1933: A. R. Mowbray & Co)
- The Rational Faith (1932: Philip Allan)
- The Riches of Christ: Readings for Lent (1934: Centenary Press)
- The Meaning of Mass: Dogmatic and devotional considerations upon the divine liturgy (1934: A. R. Mowbray & Co)
- Founded upon a Rock: An introduction to the Sermon on the Mount (1935: Centenary Press)
- The Faith and the Age (1935: Church Literature Association)
- The Place of Understanding (1936: Hodder & Stoughton)
- St John of the Cross 1542-1591: doctor of divine love (1937: Hodder & Stoughton)
- The Love of God (1938: Hodder & Stoughton)
- The Mystery of Mary (1938: A. R. Mowbray & Co)
- Prayer for All Christians (1939: A. R. Mowbray & Co)
- You: Your Nature; Your State; Your Need (1939: A. R. Mowbray & Co)
- Who? A book about God (1940: A. R. Mowbray & Co)
- In His image: a study of man's relation to God (1941: A. R. Mowbray & Co)
- Lent with St Benedict: Readings in the Holy Rules (1942: A. R. Mowbray & Co)
- Some Modern Substitutes for Christianity (1942: A. R. Mowbray & Co)
- Lent and Eastertide with the Liturgy (1944: A. R. Mowbray & Co)
- Ephesians – Colossians: A dogmatic and devotional commentary (1946: A. R. Mowbray & Co)
- The Christian Mysteries (1950: A. R. Mowbray & Co)

== Personal life ==
Frost died in 1961, aged 85, in a nursing home in Derby.

In 1896 he married Cecily Foxcroft (1874-1913), who died when they were living in Fiji. He had a son, who later became a Roman Catholic Benedictine at Belmont Abbey.
