= Sagada coffee =

Variety of Philippine coffee plant

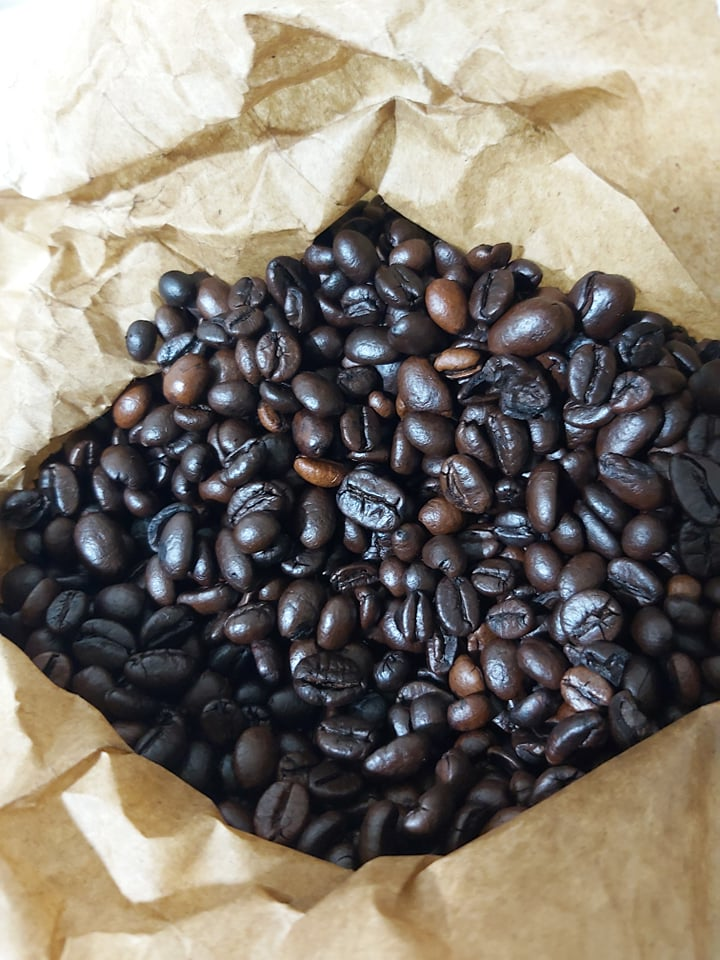
- Coffee beans from Sagada province
- Species: Coffea arabica
- Origin: Sagada, Cordillera, the Philippines

Sagada coffee, also known as Sagada arabica, is a single-origin coffee varietal grown in Sagada in the Cordillera highlands of the northern Philippines. It belongs to the species Coffea arabica, of the Typica variety.

== History ==
Arabica coffee was introduced to Sagada in the late 19th century. Relatively later in comparison to lowland coffee varietals which were introduced to the Philippines earlier during the Spanish colonial period. This was because Sagada only became recognized as a political unit by the Spanish colonial government in 1847 and didn't have much contact with the Spanish prior to that.

There are multiple conflicting accounts of when and how arabica coffee was introduced to Sagada. Most accounts credit Jaime P. Masferré, a retired Spanish soldier originally from Catalonia. He was a former detachment commander of the Guardia Civil. He married Mercedes Cunyap Langkew, a Sagada native, and established a plantation in the late 1890s in the town of Batalao after the Spanish Empire surrendered the Philippines to the United States colonial government. He grew citrus trees, mabolo persimmon, chayote, and arabica coffee (probably from Benguet) which supposedly later became part of the crops of the local communities. His son, Eduardo Masferré also became notable in his own right and is regarded as the "father of Philippine photography."

The coffee trees were also said to have been spread to the northern areas of Sagada by Okoi, a Japanese immigrant and a carpenter who worked for the American missionaries in the village of Fidelisan. He acquired coffee seedlings through his friendship with Masferré and planted them in Fidelisan.

== Cultivation ==
Sagada coffee production is centered in the municipalities of Sagada and Besao in Mountain Province, northern Luzon. Like Benguet, the climate of the Cordillera highlands of Sagada is highly suitable for arabica cultivation. Production is mostly in backyard and small-scale farms of the Sagada natives since the early 1900s. In Fidelisan, there are century-old coffee trees that still produce beans.

Most were for local consumption, though they bartered surplus beans to traveling traders from the lowlands. They also used coffee beans to barter for goods from local merchants. Cultivating and harvesting Sagada coffee were traditionally women's activities, often involving the entire community. Sagada coffee is characterized by its bittersweet taste with fruity or floral overtones.

Sagada coffee is rare, even in local markets, because there have never been large-scale plantations of Sagada coffee until recently. There are increasing government initiatives to encourage its production in recent years, including providing training and equipment. In Sagada, there is a municipal ordinance that requires every household to plant at least five Sagada coffee trees. Before granting a marriage license, the local Sagada government also requires couples to plant the same number of trees. However the industry still struggles because of lack of awareness and low local demand.

Sagada coffee farmers has won on Philippine Coffee Quality Competition (PCQC) increasing awareness of quality arabica coffee to coffee drinkers. Mr. Gareth Likigan has won the 6th place on 2025 PCQC.

== See also ==
- Benguet coffee
- Barako coffee
- Sulu coffee
- Tsokolate
