= Food literacy =

Food literacy is a term that that describes the collective knowledge, skill, and behaviours needed to plan and manage one's relationship with food, select food that meets dietary needs while minimising drawbacks of food choices on environmental and social issues, and prepare and consume food that meets one's nutritional requirements and well-being. There are multiple definitions of food literacy depending on the context or setting, and definitions can include the knowledge of sustainable diet and food practices.

Food literacy allows people to make adequate and informed food choices within their specific environmental and social context, and is linked to healthier dietary practices. Social, economic, political, cultural, and environmental factors can influence food literacy. Inadequate or low food literacy is also termed food illiteracy, and is associated with a higher likelihood of nutritional disparities, chronic health conditions and poor health outcomes.

Studies have shown that the ability of people to understand, appreciate, and manage their relationship with food is declining due to multiple factors, including decreased food security, the loss of food heritage and the globalization of food systems. Various interventions and efforts to improve food literacy include educational programs and government initiatives aimed at both children and adults.

== Definition and history ==
While the term is sometimes used interchangeably with nutrition, the two concepts are not synonymous with each other. Multiple academic papers have discussed the scope of the term, which has shifted and changed over time. Many academic studies use a 2012 definition of food literacy, which defines the concept as "a collection of interrelated knowledge, skills and behaviours required to plan, manage, select, prepare and eat foods to meet needs and determine food intake." However, academics have argued that food literacy encompasses and goes beyond this definition, and a 2017 paper defined food literacy as the collection of three sets of interdependent competencies: 1. the ability to plan and manage one's relationship with food; 2. the ability to select and choose food that meet personal dietary needs and minimize the drawbacks of food choices on environmental and social issues; and 3. the ability to prepare and consume food, avoiding pitfalls and mistakes in dietary intakes."

Food literacy was originally described as the ability to avoid mistakes and pitfalls during the buying, preparation, and consumption of food, defined in 2001 as "the capacity of an individual to obtain, process and understand basic information about food and nutrition as well as the competence to use that information in order to make appropriate health decisions", which was similar to the conventional usage of health literacy to describe an individual's ability to understand health information and access health services.

The term gained popularity in the 2010s alongside the increasing usage of the word "literacy" to describe the knowledge and skills required to navigate specific areas, as seen in the terms health literacy, digital literacy, and financial literacy. The now widespread use of this term in both academic study and governmental policy may be due to the inadequacy of an existing term to cover the complex range of knowledge, skills, and behaviours needed to meet daily food needs, including cooking, nutrition knowledge, and food preparation.

== Effects ==
Academic studies have shown that the ability of people to understand, appreciate, and manage their relationship with food is declining due to multiple factors. Reasons include the globalization of food systems leading to decreased food security, the deterioration of public knowledge about food, and the loss of local food heritage and culture.

Food is essential for healthy development and is important to improving quality of life. Food plays an important role in the prevention and management of chronic disease prevention, which requires selection of appropriate food and the regular, long-term practice of healthy habits such as exercise. Poor eating habits and perceived decreased understanding around food and skills related to food preparation have been linked to the rise in diet-related diseases and obesity worldwide. Due to changes in the food supply chain and the rise of food industrialization, individuals must navigate the food system as it changes and grows in complexity, in order to ensure regular and healthy food intake. Diet availability, choice, and consumption are influenced by health, social, environmental, political, cultural, and economic factors.

At the individual level, low food literacy is linked to the decreased capability of a person's ability to assess and meet their nutritional needs, leading to poor dietary intake, as well as poor psychological and physical well-being. At a collective level, low food literacy hinders the ability to participate in systemic interventions intended to increase behaviour and social changes with the goal of improving community food well-being.

== Improving food literacy ==
Academics and policymakers have proposed various large-scale public interventions aimed to improve food literacy, ranging from educational programmes targeted at children and adolescents to government initiatives promoting healthy and sustainable behaviours in adult consumers.

== See also ==
- Human nutrition
- Healthy diet
- Food pyramid
- Healthy eating pyramid
- 5 A Day
- Food heritage
- Food security
