= Church of Saint Mary the Virgin (Sagada) =

Anglican church in Mountain Province, Philippines

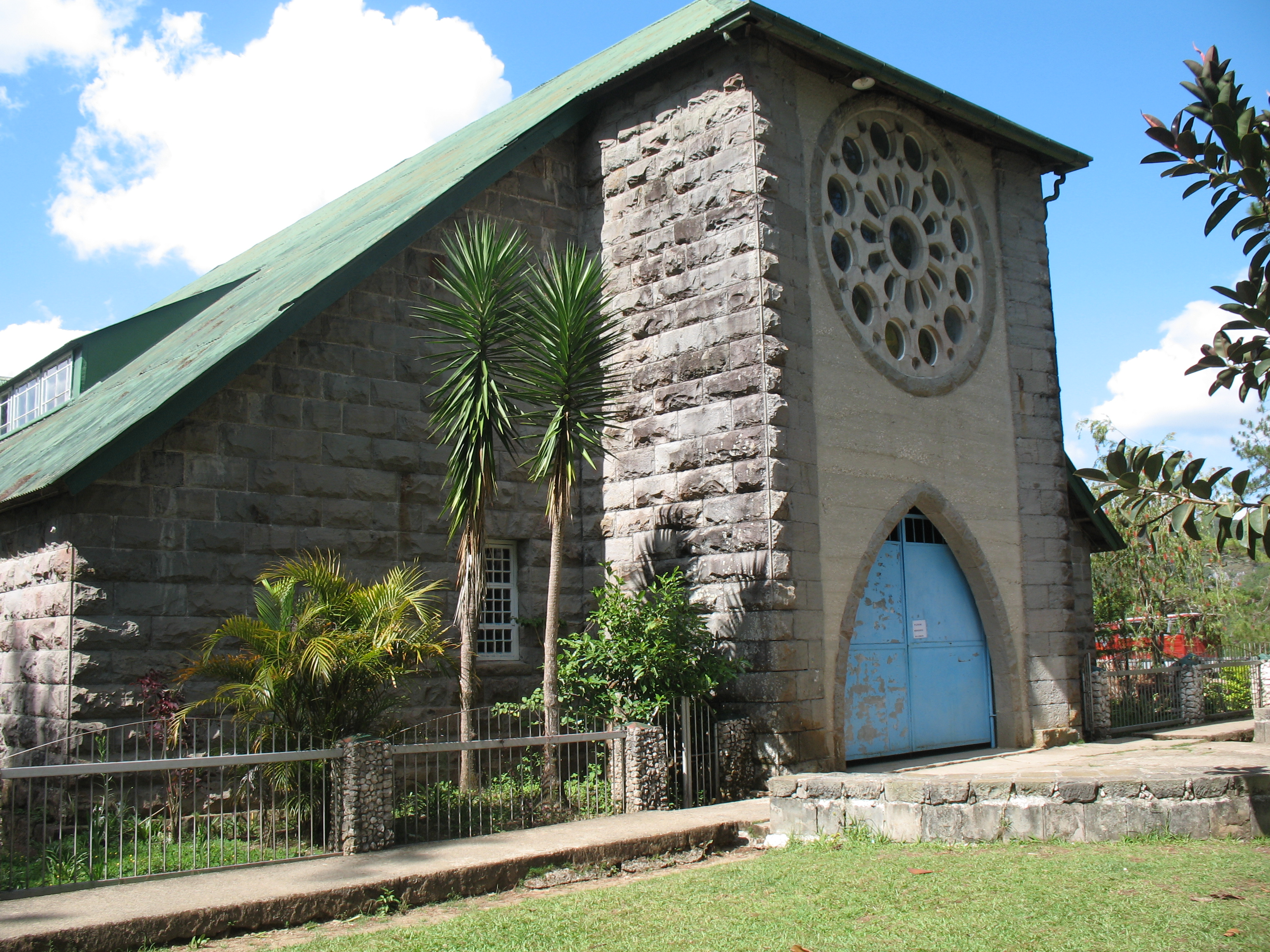

- Location in Luzon Location in the Philippines
- 17°05′01″N 120°54′08″E
- Location: Sagada, Mountain Province
- Country: Philippines
- Denomination: Anglican

History
- Dedication: Mary, mother of Jesus

Architecture
- Architectural type: Gothic Revival
- Years built: 1904

Administration
- Diocese: Northern Philippines

Clergy
- Rector: Fr. Constancio Na-oy

The Church of St. Mary the Virgin is the main Episcopal church in Sagada, Mountain Province, Philippines.

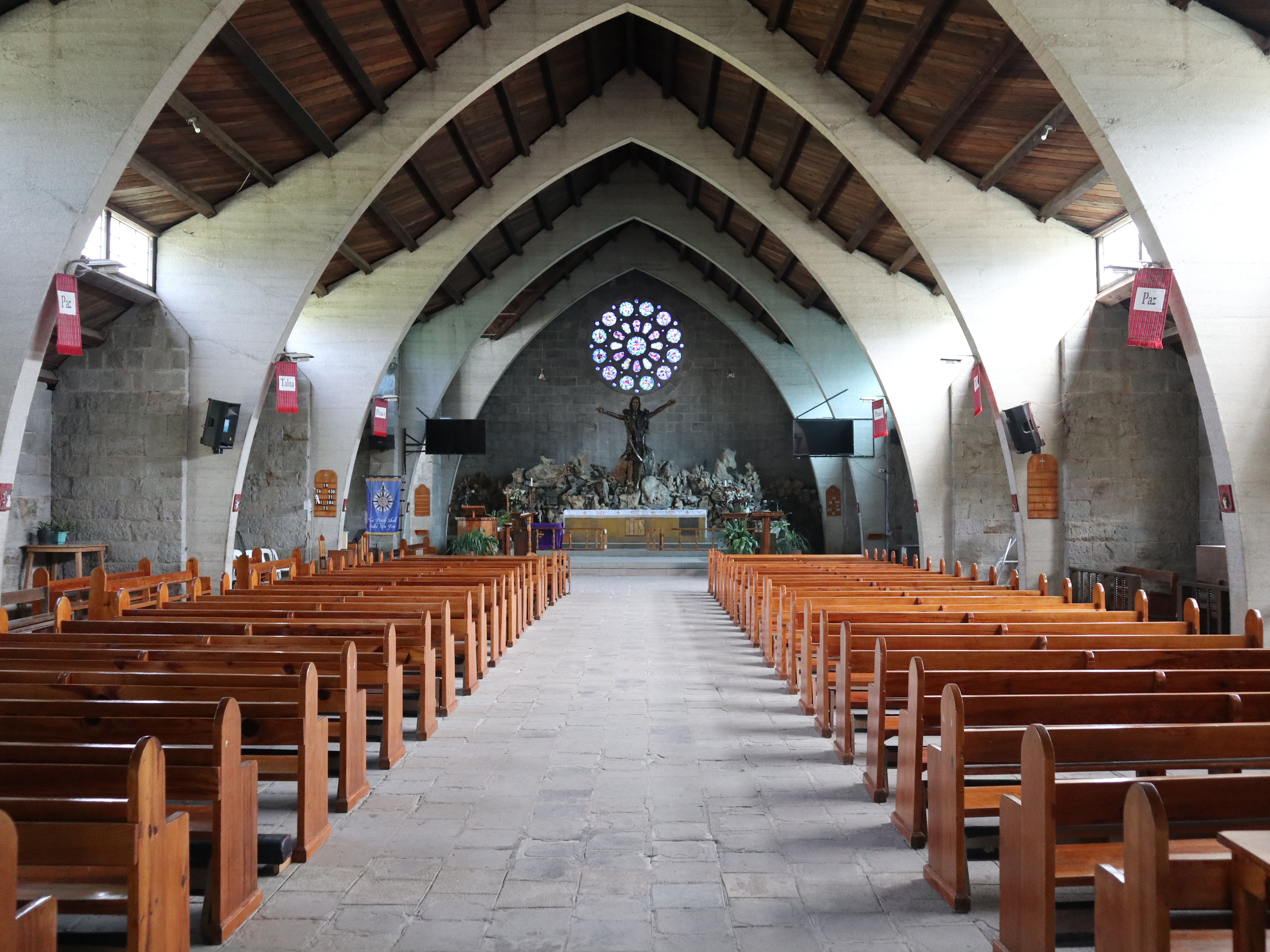
Nave

It was built in 1904 by American missionaries under the auspices of the Episcopal Church in the United States (Protestant Episcopal Church in the United States of America) led by Rev. John Staunton when the Philippines was opened to American Protestant missions after the country was ceded to the United States from Spain in 1898. In 1918 the Rev Albert Frost was appointed as Staunton's assistant.

St Mary's, Sagada was notoriously Anglo-Catholic under Fr Staunton's leadership, but Frost introduced a number of new devotions: the proper observance of Candlemas and Corpus Christi, May devotions to the Blessed Virgin Mary, June devotions in honour of the Sacred Heart, November intercessions for the Holy Souls, and Benediction of the Blessed Sacrament as a regular feature of Sunday worship.

In 1918 Bishop Charles Brent was translated to a diocese in New York, and jurisdiction of the Philippines was transferred to Bishop Graves of Shanghai. Graves undertook a visitation in November 1918, and held that the singing of hymns before the Reserved Sacrament and the statue of the Virgin were illegal. He issued a directive, prohibiting such veneration. Despite threats to resign, Staunton and Frost remained in post, and the practices of Sagada continued. However, the appointment of Brent's successor, Frank Mosher, led to a final row: in September 1924 the Bishop invited the Chaplain of Brent School to open the communion rail to non-Episcopalians. Staunton declared this to be a "Pan-Protestant virus", and both he and Frost resigned at the end of 1924.

In 1983 during the Marcos dictatorship, refugees fleeing the Beew massacre (in which the 623rd Philippine Constabulary burned down Sitio Beew in Tuba, Abra, claiming that they were "rebel sympathizers") were forced to take refuge in the Church of the St. Mary, where they were given succor by Fr. Paul Sagayo Jr. until they could finally be aided by Atty Pablo Sanidad of the Free Legal Assistance Group and journalist Isidoro Chammag of the Bulletin Today.

American historian William Henry Scott was buried in its grounds on October 10, 1993.

The church is subsequently a member of the Episcopal Church in the Philippines.
