= Champorado =

Chocolate rice porridge

- A plate of champorado with tuyo and milk on the side
- Alternative names: Tsampurado
- Type: Porridge
- Place of origin: Philippines
- Region or state: Manila
- Serving temperature: Hot or cold
- Main ingredients: Glutinous rice, tabliya, milk or coconut milk, sugar
- Ingredients generally used: Daing or Tuyô and roasted cocoa beans
- Variations: Tinughong
- Food energy (per serving): 244.30 kcal (1,022.2 kJ)
Nutritional value
(per serving)
- Protein: 7.60 g
- Fat: 10 g
- Carbohydrate: 54.50 g
- Similar dishes: Champurrado

Champorado or tsampurado is a sweet chocolate rice porridge in Filipino cuisine.

== Etymology ==
The name of the dish originates from the Spanish word champurrado, derived from champurrar, meaning 'to mix'.

== Ingredients ==
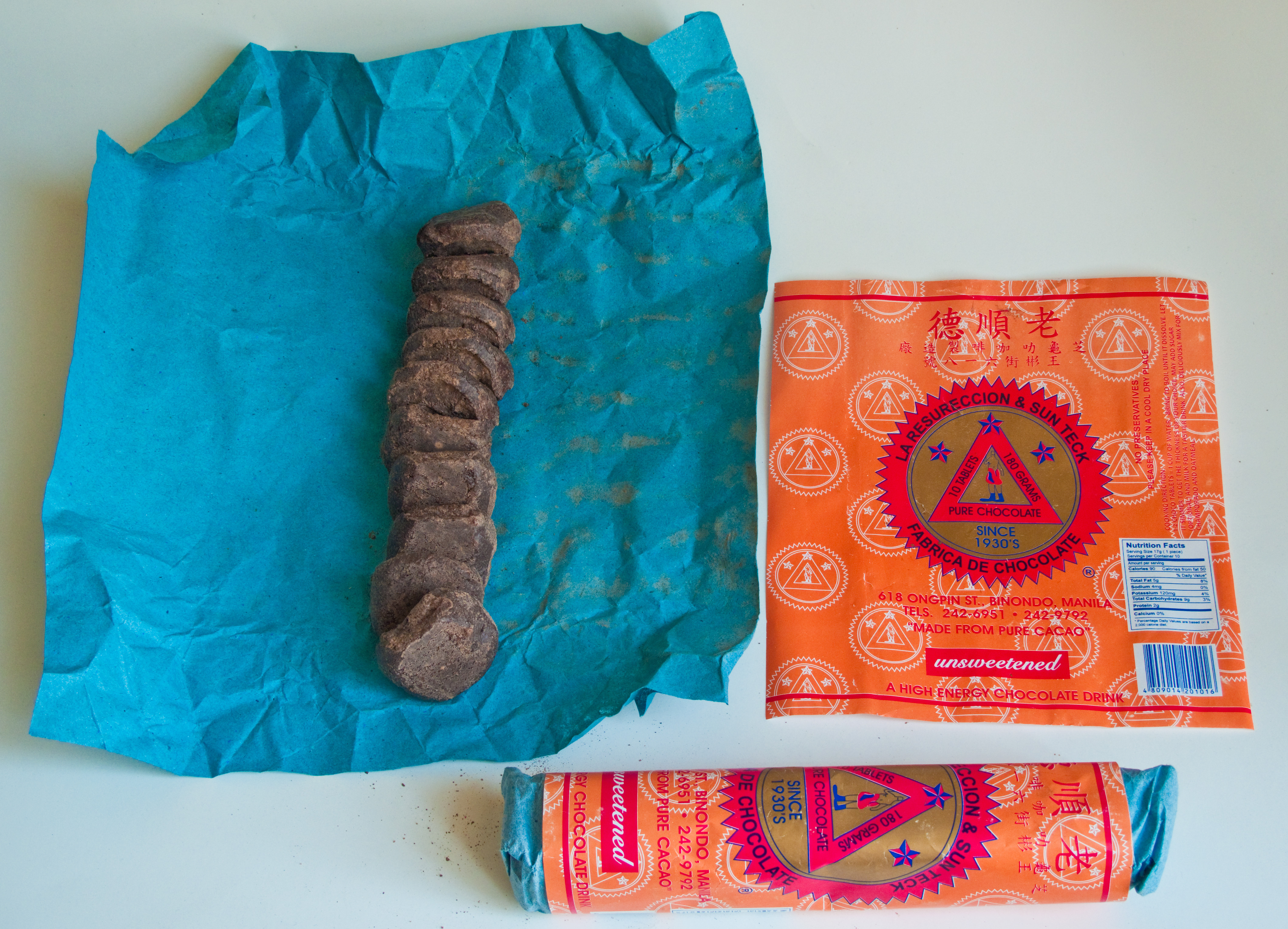
Packet of chocolate tablets (tablea) for making champorado

It is traditionally made by boiling sticky rice with tablea (traditional tablets of pure ground roasted cocoa beans). It can be served hot or cold, usually for breakfast or merienda, with a drizzle of milk (or coconut milk) and sugar to taste. It is usually eaten as is, but a common pairing is with salted dried fish (daing or tuyo).

Tinughong is a variant of champorado in the Visayan-speaking regions of the Philippines. It is usually made by boiling sticky rice with sugar instead of tablea. Coffee or milk are sometimes added to it.

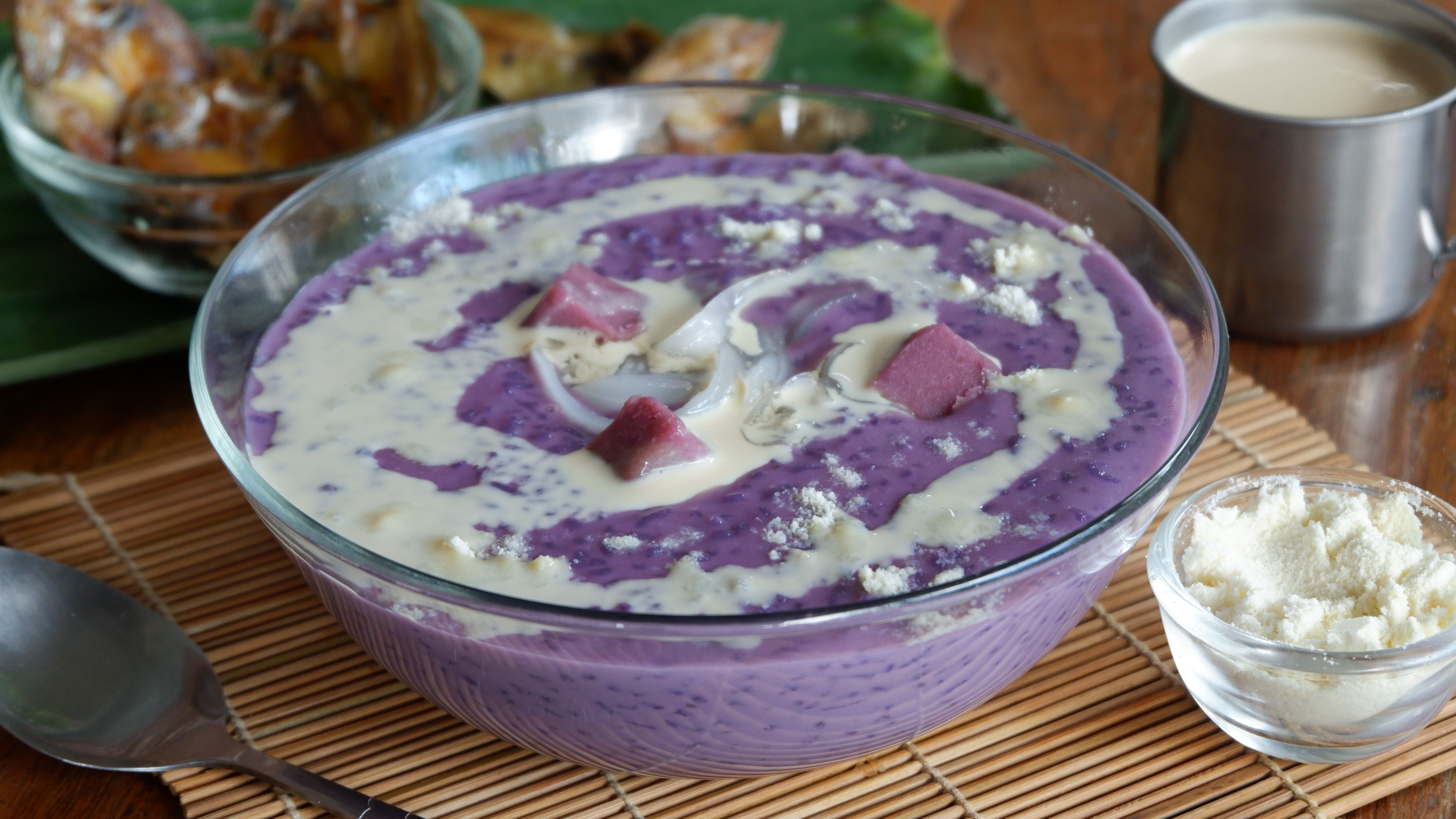
Ube champorado

A popular new variant of champorado is ube champorado, which has a purple yam (ube) flavoring and ube halaya. It is characteristically purple like all ube-based dishes. Other contemporary variants include white, pandan and strawberry flavors.

== History ==
Its history can be traced back from the Spanish colonial period of the Philippines. During the galleon trade between Mexico and the Philippines, Mexican traders brought not just the native crop of cocoa and the chocolate product itself but also the knowledge of making champurrado to the Philippines, while tuba was introduced back in Mexico. Through the years, the recipe changed; Filipinos eventually found ways to make the Mexican champurrado a Philippine champorado by replacing masa with sticky rice.

== See also ==
- List of porridges
- Tsokolate
- Chocolate industry in the Philippines
