= Sunshine Plata Alimagno =

Filipina coffee painter

Sunshina Plata Alimagno
- Education: University of Santo Tomas
- Known for: Coffee painting

Sunshine Plata Alimagno (née Plata; January 12, 1980) is a Filipina coffee painter.

== Early and personal life ==
Plata was born on January 12, 1980. She is the 2nd among 4 siblings. She has always been interested in art and was active in art clubs at school wherein she learned techniques in painting. Plata's parents, however, wanted her to pursue the medical field.

Despite being known for coffee paintings, Plata says she is rather a tea connoisseur.

== Education ==
Plata obtained a bachelor’s degree in Psychology from the University of Santo Tomas, in 2002. She tried to shift to fine arts, but she did not pass the exam.

== Work ==
Plata worked as a pre-school teacher at PAREF Rosehill School after graduating. In 2007, she decided to quit to work full-time as an artist.

Plata had her first solo exhibit in 2008 named “L.S.D. Trip by Caffeine” at Instituto Cervantes’ Casino Espanol de Manila. She was surprised that 24 of 33 painting were sold overnight. Plata was featured at Ripley's Believe It or Not!. Her works Fairy of Sorrows and Reina dela Luna were purchased and displayed at Ripley’s New York Museum in Times Square.

== Art ==
Plata got into coffee painting after looking for cheaper alternatives to oil paints. She mostly uses kapeng barako and at seldom it would be instant coffee. Plata renders her dreams, which is her main source of inspiration. She later realized that she is restricted to varying tones of brown, so she incorporated patterns to her works to add complexity and detail. The patterns are spontaneously made as she paints along on watercolor papers.

Plata eventually began adding dashes of watercolor to create other hues of brown, such as pinkish brown, bluish brown etc. She limits it to a small scale so as not to outshine the coffee. Lastly, she puts a fixative to ensure that the paintings will last longer.

Plata likes to paint women, children, farmers and animals like butterflies and fishes. She also likes to explore religious images.
