= Sagada orange =

Variety of fruit

- Species: Citrus × sinensis
- Cultivar: 'Sagada'
- Origin: Kalinga (province), Philippines

The Sagada orange is a variety of orange grown in the Cordillera region of the Philippines. The variety was first developed by the Department of Agriculture and was first propagated in Kalinga. The fruit due to being larger than an average orange became popular in Sagada, Mountain Province and gained reputation as a "giant orange" variety hence the name of the orange variety. The Sagada orange skin is color orange with green patches.

It was reported that local merchants from tourist destinations in the Cordilleras such as Baguio and even as far as in Divisoria marketplace in Manila, were labeling larger oranges from China as "Sagada oranges". The Sagada orange was named “Mislabeled of the Year" by Baguio newspaper Midland Courier. The oranges from China were cheaper and larger but less sweet than the Sagada variety. The Chinese oranges sold has a brighter orange color than the Sagada orange. Midland Courier criticized as unethical the practice of merchants deliberately mislabeling oranges from China as "Sagada oranges".
