= Kinutil =

Filipino alcoholic drink

- Origin: Philippines, Visayas, Mindanao
- Ingredients: Palm wine, chocolate and/or egg yolks

Kinutil, also known as kinutir or kutir, is a Filipino alcoholic drink from the Visayas Islands and Mindanao. It is made from palm wine (tubâ) with raw egg yolks and/or homemade chocolate (tabliya). Some versions also add condensed milk, sugar, and carbonated softdrinks. A version made with chocolate and sugar in the island of Samar is known as dubado. It is typically paired with Filipino rice cakes (kakanin). The name means "stirred", from Visayan kutil ("to stir"). It is sometimes characterized as the "Filipino eggnog" or the "Filipino mudslide".
