= Kapeng barako =

Variety of Philippine coffee plant

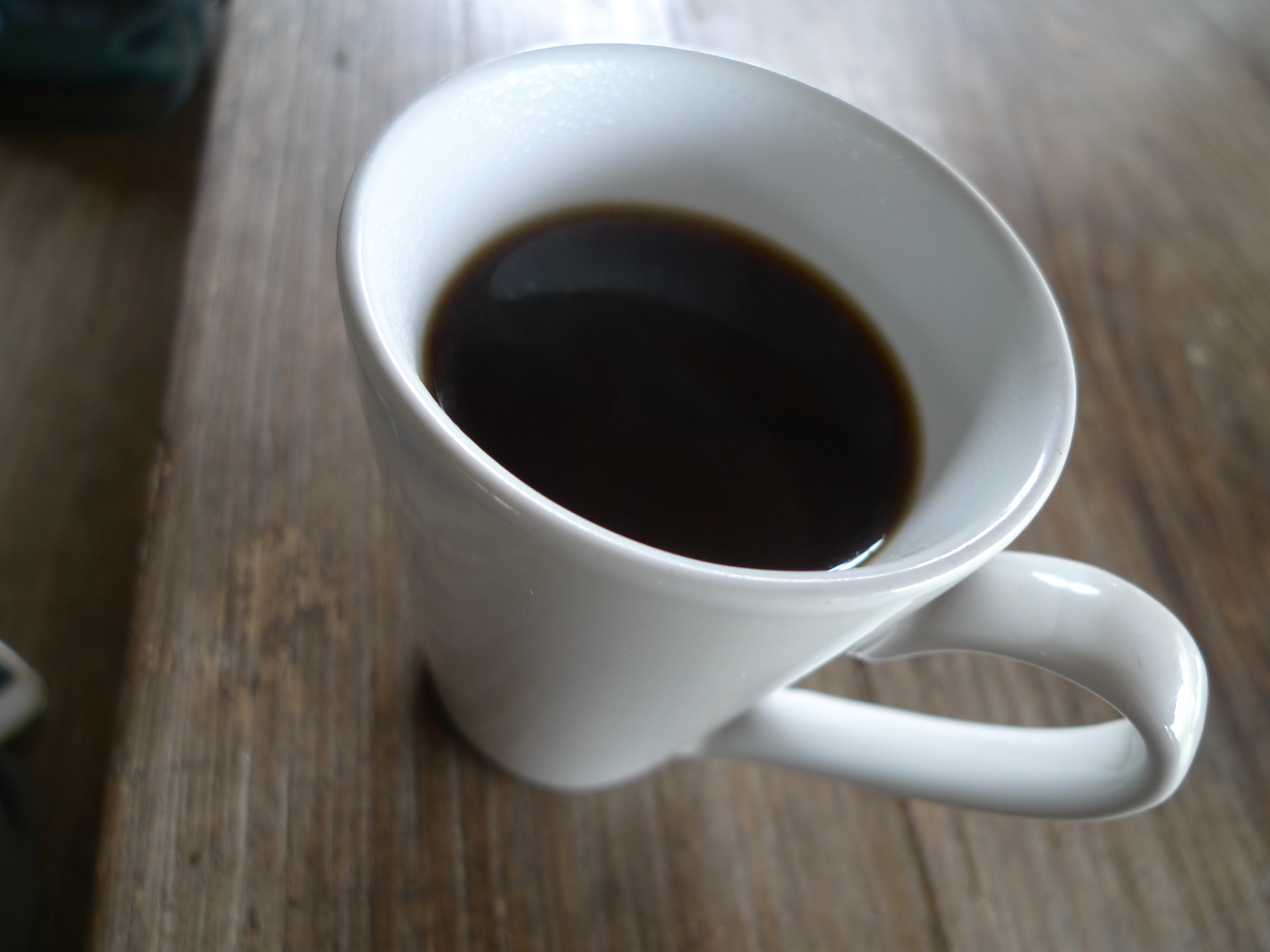
Kapeng barako in Tagaytay, Cavite

Kapeng barako (Spanish: café varraco or café verraco), also known as Barako coffee or Batangas coffee, is a coffee varietal grown in the Philippines, particularly in the provinces of Batangas and Cavite. It belongs to the species Coffea liberica. The term is also used to refer to all coffee coming from those provinces. Barako in the languages of the Philippines means "stud" and is associated with the image of masculinity. Barako has a strong flavor and fragrance reminiscent of aniseed.

Barako trees are some of the largest commercially cultivated coffee trees, which make them more difficult to grow. They are considered endangered due to low production and demand. It is listed in the Ark of Taste international catalogue of endangered heritage foods by the Slow Food movement.

== Etymology ==
Barako in Philippine languages is equivalent to the English term "stud" (both literally and figuratively), from Spanish verraco, "wild boar" (baboy ramo in Tagalog). The word is associated with connotations of masculinity and machismo in Filipino culture.

== History ==
Barako coffee was introduced to the Philippines in the 1740s by Spanish friars. It was originally planted in the lowlands of Lipa, Batangas. From there it spread to other areas in the province, and Batangas became known for its coffee locally. Barako was also historically exported from the 1860s onwards to San Francisco in the United States and to parts of Europe, commanding prices of five times the prices of other Asian coffee beans. In 1876, barako cultivation spread to the neighboring province of Cavite.

The Philippines became one of the top four producers of coffee in the world in the 1880s, after coffee rust devastated plantations worldwide. However, in 1889, the coffee industry in the Philippines also collapsed after coffee rust spread to the islands. This caused most farmers to shift to other crops. Only a few barako seedlings survived, most of which were now in Cavite. In the mid-20th century, coffee demand once again surged, but barako didn't make a comeback because of the difficulty of cultivating it in comparison to other coffee varieties. Instead the new surge in coffee production focused on coffee rust-resistant cultivars imported from the United States.

== Description ==
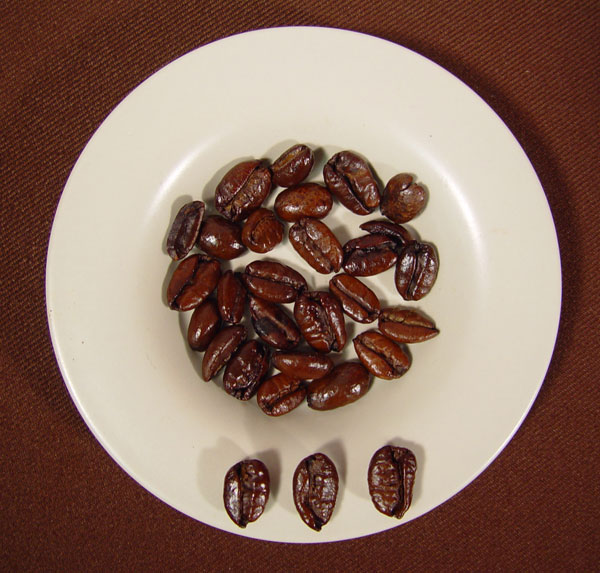
Liberica beans from Mindoro, Philippines

The shape of the liberica beans is unique among other commercial species (arabica, robusta, and excelsa). It is asymmetric, with one side shorter than the other side, creating a characteristic "hook" at the tip. The central furrow is also more jagged in comparison to other coffee beans.

Barako trees are very tall, reaching up to 20 m (66 ft) high. They are harvested using ladders. The size of the cherries, the beans, and the leaves of barako are also among the largest of all coffee varieties.

Its taste is said to be superior to Robusta, and most Philippine coffee drinkers prefer barako to Arabica. Arabica–varraco and excelsa–varraco blends are popular and create a cup with a broader flavor range. It has a distinctive flavor and a strong fragrance reminiscent of aniseed.

== Cultivation and conservation ==
Barako only accounts for less than 2% of commercial coffee grown. It is abundant in the Philippines. It is rarely exported, as most production comes from small farms. It is sold to the local and tourist market. It is also produced in Malaysia. Beyond its culinary use, the C. liberica species has gained global ecological importance due to its unique resilience in waterlogged, acidic peat soils. In regions like Sumatra and Borneo, it is increasingly utilized as a key crop for peatland restoration (paludiculture), providing a sustainable economic alternative to drainage-based agriculture and helping to prevent peat fires.

The large sizes of barako trees make it less efficient for production and harvesting than other coffee varieties, causing most modern farmers to shy away from it and grow robusta cultivars instead. However, there is recent interest in reviving and conserving barako, including increasing preference for it in local coffee shops in the Philippines.

Barako coffee is listed in the Ark of Taste international catalogue of endangered heritage foods by the Slow Food movement.

== Preparation ==
Barako coffee is prepared as you would other coffee strains, using a drip brewing device, French press, or by simply pouring hot water unto the grounds and filtering the mixture using a piece of cloth. Barako is traditionally prepared black or sweetened with muscovado sugar. Barako can be used to make espresso and other espresso-based drinks.

== Cocktails ==
Barako coffee or Liberica Coffee has recently been seen imported and sold in Canada and incorporated into various common espresso based cocktails such as a liberica espresso martinis.

== Other uses ==
Aside from being a beverage, kapeng barako is also used as a body scrub in spa treatment. Batangueños use kapeng barako as an alternative to soup as part of the rice dish. It is usually used when eating tapa or any dry/fried dish. Kapeng barako from Batangas is now gaining popularity among consumers, mainly for its unique, authentic and traditional appeal.

== See also ==
- Benguet coffee
- Sagada coffee
- Sulu coffee
- Tsokolate
