= Eduardo Masferré =

- Born: April 18, 1909; Sagada, Mountain Province, Philippine Islands
- Died: June 24, 1995 (aged 86); Sagada, Mountain Province, Philippines
- Occupation: Photographer
- Spouse: Nena Ogues
- Children: 6

Eduardo Masferré (April 18, 1909 – June 24, 1995) was a Filipino-Catalan photographer who made important documentary reports about the lifestyle of native people in the region of the Cordillera in the Philippines at the middle of 20th century. He is regarded as the Father of Philippine photography.

Born in Sagada in Mountain Province in northern Luzon, his father was a Spanish soldier who had emigrated from Spain in the late nineteenth century. Eduardo's marriage to Nena Ogues blessed him with six children.

In 1914, his father took their family to Sant Feliu de Guíxols so that their children could study in Catalonia. But in 1921, they returned to the Philippines. Eduardo finished his studies on the islands. His father eventually became a farmer and an Episcopalian priest.

In his early years, he became interested in photography. He was a self-taught photographer. When he returned to his hometown, he was devoted to take pictures of his surroundings among which were the native Igorots. His photos are mostly pictures of people rather than landscapes. At the same time, he began working with his father on the farm and in Episcopalian evangelism.

When World War II ended, he opened a photographic studio in Bontoc. His portraits are a visual documentary of the life stories of indigenous peoples in the Cordillera Central. His subjects included ceremonies, rituals, and everyday life. There are estimates that place have some seven million photographs on this subject in the fifties made in Bontoc, Kalinga, and Ifugao. His photographs are intended to show the life of the natives from the point of view of someone who lives with them and with which it identifies, so it has a type emic ethnographic value.

His photographs have been exhibited since the late eighties. Their first two exhibitions were held in Manila in 1982 and 1983, then in Copenhagen in 1984, and Tokyo in 1986. But his most prominent international recognition came from the International Photography Encounters in Arles in 1989. The following year, Smithsonian Institution bought 120 prints of his works for the National Museum of Natural History. The Museum of Yale University was also interested in his works. Since then, there have been many exhibitions of his work. Their study in the Philippines has become a museum and art center.

His book is titled meaning People of the Philippine Cordillera. Photographs 1934-1956 and was published in 1988.
