= Sagada, Russia =

Sagada (Russian: Сагада) is the name of several rural localities in Russia.

Modern localities

- Sagada, Republic of Dagestan, a rural locality (a selo) in Tlyatsudinsky Selsoviet of Tsuntinsky District in the Republic of Dagestan; 42°24′N 45°56′E

Renamed localities

- Sagada, in 1944–1957, name of Belty, a rural locality (a selo) in Yalkhoy-Mokhkskaya Rural Administration of Kurchaloyevsky District in the Chechen Republic
