= Merienda =

Afternoon light meal from southern Europe

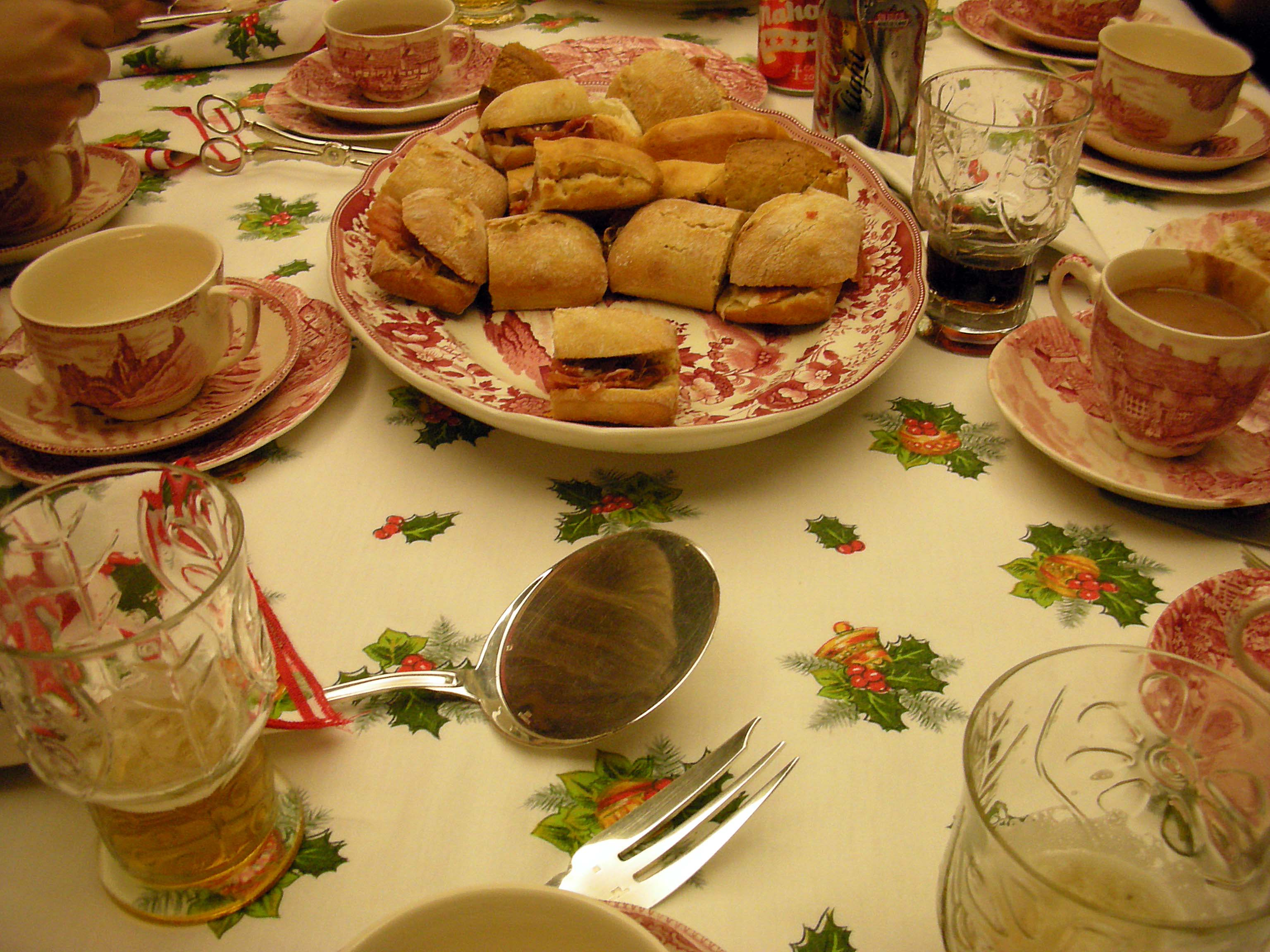
Typical merienda fare

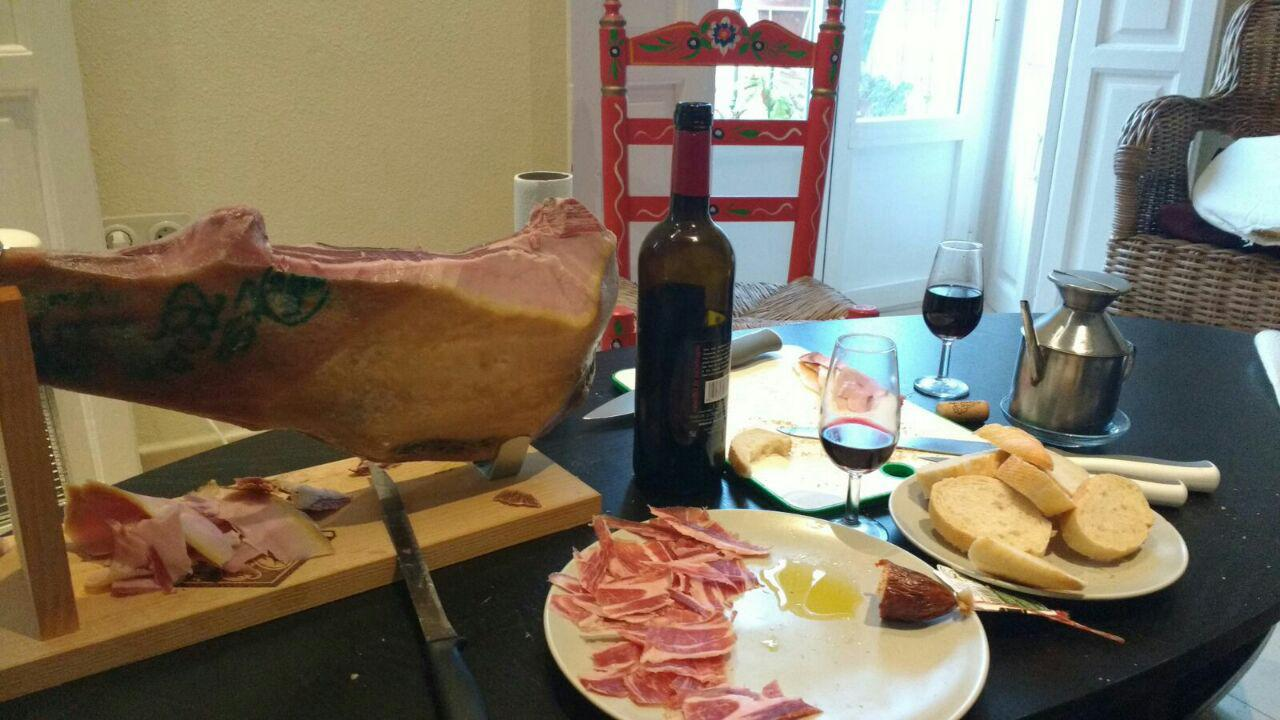
Typical vespertine merienda in the South of Spain

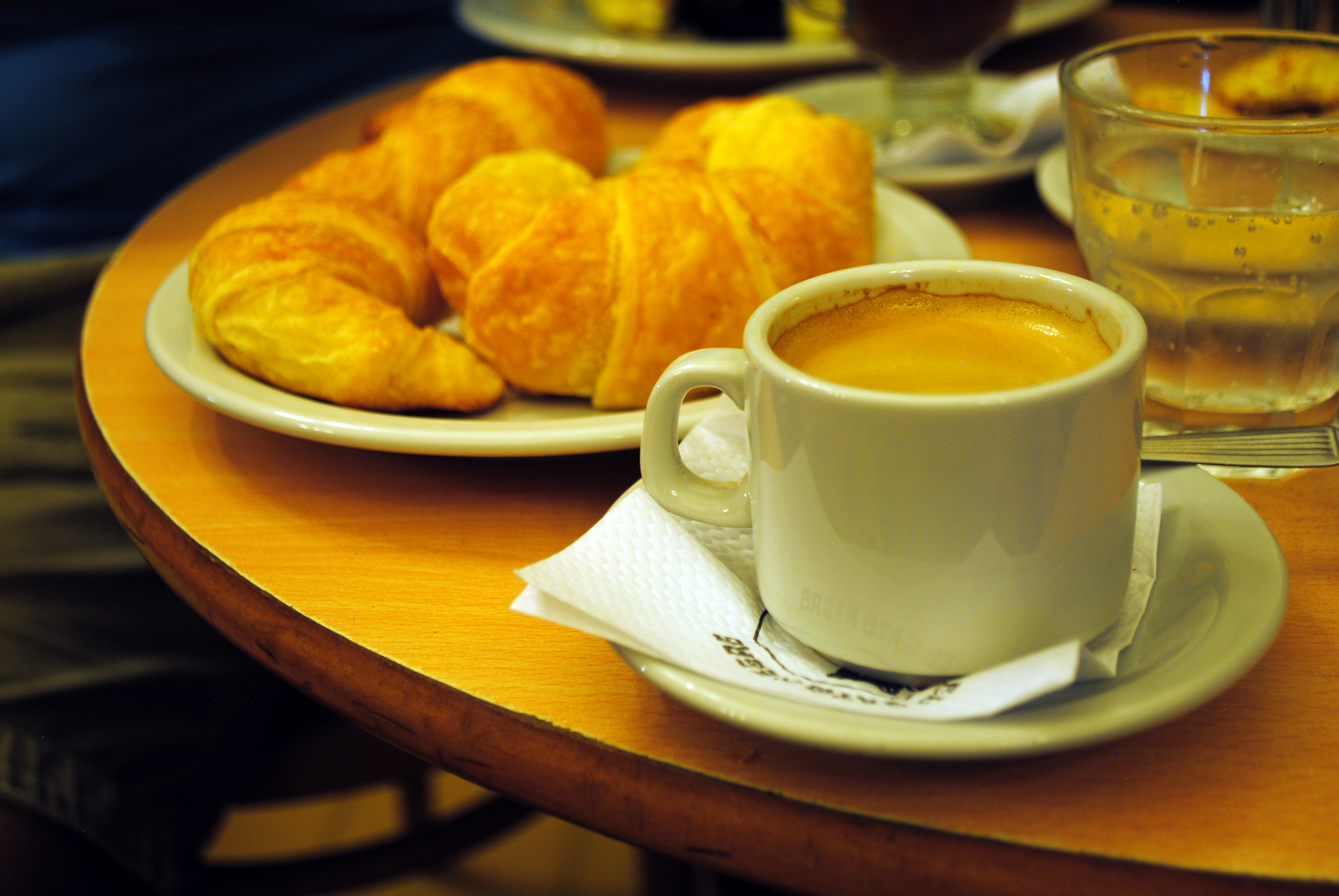
Traditional serving of merienda in Café El Gato Negro, Buenos Aires: medialunas (croissants), café en jarrito (a double espresso coffee) and a little glass of sparkling water

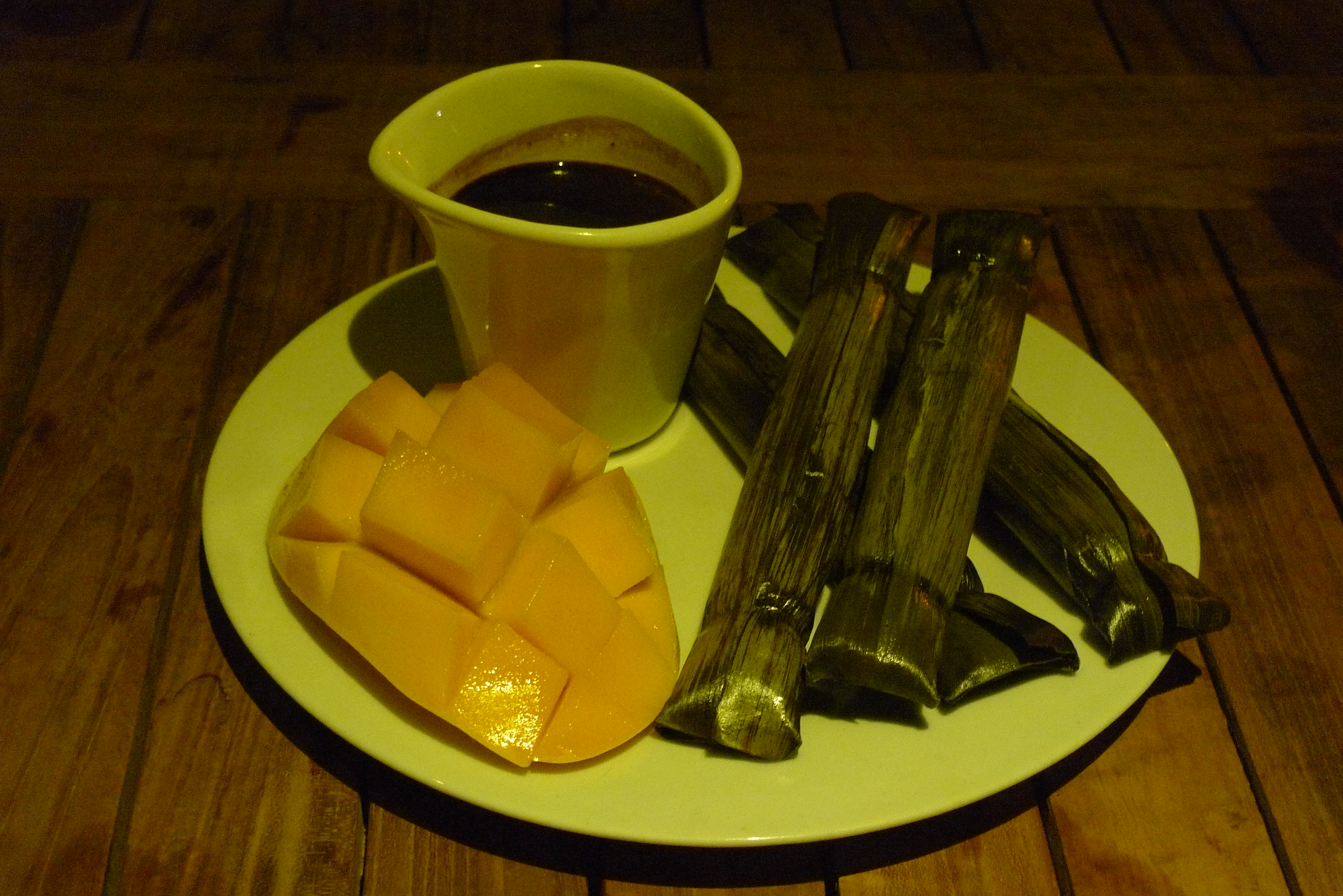
A typical meryenda in the Philippines, tsokolate with suman rice cakes and ripe carabao mangoes

Merienda is a light meal in southern Europe, particularly Spain (merenda in Galician, berenar in Catalan), Portugal (lanche, merenda) and Italy (merenda), whence the word spread to Serbo-Croatian (marenda), and former Yugoslavia as well as France (goûter), Hispanic America, the Philippines (meryenda/merienda), North Africa, and Brazil (lanche, merenda or café da tarde). Usually taken in the afternoon or for brunch, it fills in the meal gap between the noontime meal and the evening meal, being the equivalent of afternoon tea in the English-speaking world, or between breakfast and lunch. It is a simple meal that often consists of a piece of fruit, bread, biscuits, yogurt, and other snacks accompanied by fruit juice, milk, hot chocolate, coffee, spirits, or other beverages.

It is typical for Argentines, Paraguayans, and Uruguayans to have merienda around 5:00 pm, between the midday meal and supper. It generally consists of an infusion such as tea, mate, coffee or mate cocido, and a baked snack such as scones, bread, toast, cake or facturas, etc.), usually accompanied with dulce de leche, honey, butter or jam.

In the Philippines, merienda (Filipino: meryenda) is a generic term encompassing two light meals: the first is a morning snack that may correspond to either brunch, elevenses, or second breakfast; the second one is the equivalent of afternoon tea. Merienda taken in the early evening around sunset just before or in place of dinner is meanwhile distinctly referred to as merienda cena. Generally speaking, merienda refers to any kind of dish or snack in a portion smaller than the traditional "full meal" consisting of rice and a complementary viand (unless the merienda is taken as brunch or merienda cena), coupled with either a cool or hot drink (usually coffee). Common fare may be sweet or savoury, ranging from breads and pastries (notably pandesal), desserts and sweets, street food, to noodle dishes.

In coastal parts of Croatia, Slovenia, Montenegro, Bosnia and Herzegovina and on the Greek island of Corfu, it is referred to marenda, a meal eaten between breakfast and lunch. Usually it is a light snack, like sandwiches or toast, eaten during a work break.

== Goûter ==
In France, the merienda is called goûter or quatre-heures; the latter name refers to its timing at around four in the afternoon. The modern goûter is lighter than a full meal and is more often consumed by children than by adults. It was a full cold meal until the 18th century, before which the goûter was taken at around 5:00 pm, but began to decline in popularity thereafter, since the evening meal was consumed at about 6:00 pm.

== See also ==
- Snack
