= Frank Mosher =

American Episcopal/Anglican bishop

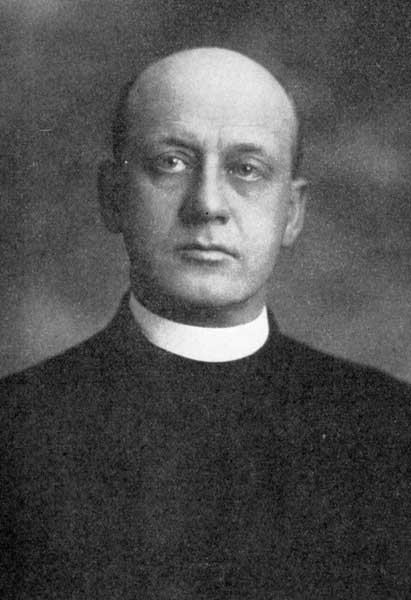
Reverend Gouverneur Frank Mosher in 1923

Gouverneur Frank Mosher (1871 – July 19, 1941) was an Episcopal Missionary Bishop of the Philippine Islands. He was born at Stapleton, New York (Staten Island) and studied at Union College, Schenectady and Berkeley Divinity School in Middletown, Connecticut. He served as a missionary priest in China from 1896 to 1920, and was consecrated Missionary Bishop of the Philippine Islands on February 25, 1920, in the Church of Our Saviour, Shanghai. He was a member of the Psi Upsilon fraternity.

He died in New York City.
