= Sagada =

Municipality in Mountain Province, Philippines

Sagada Ganduyan
- Municipality
- Municipality of Sagada
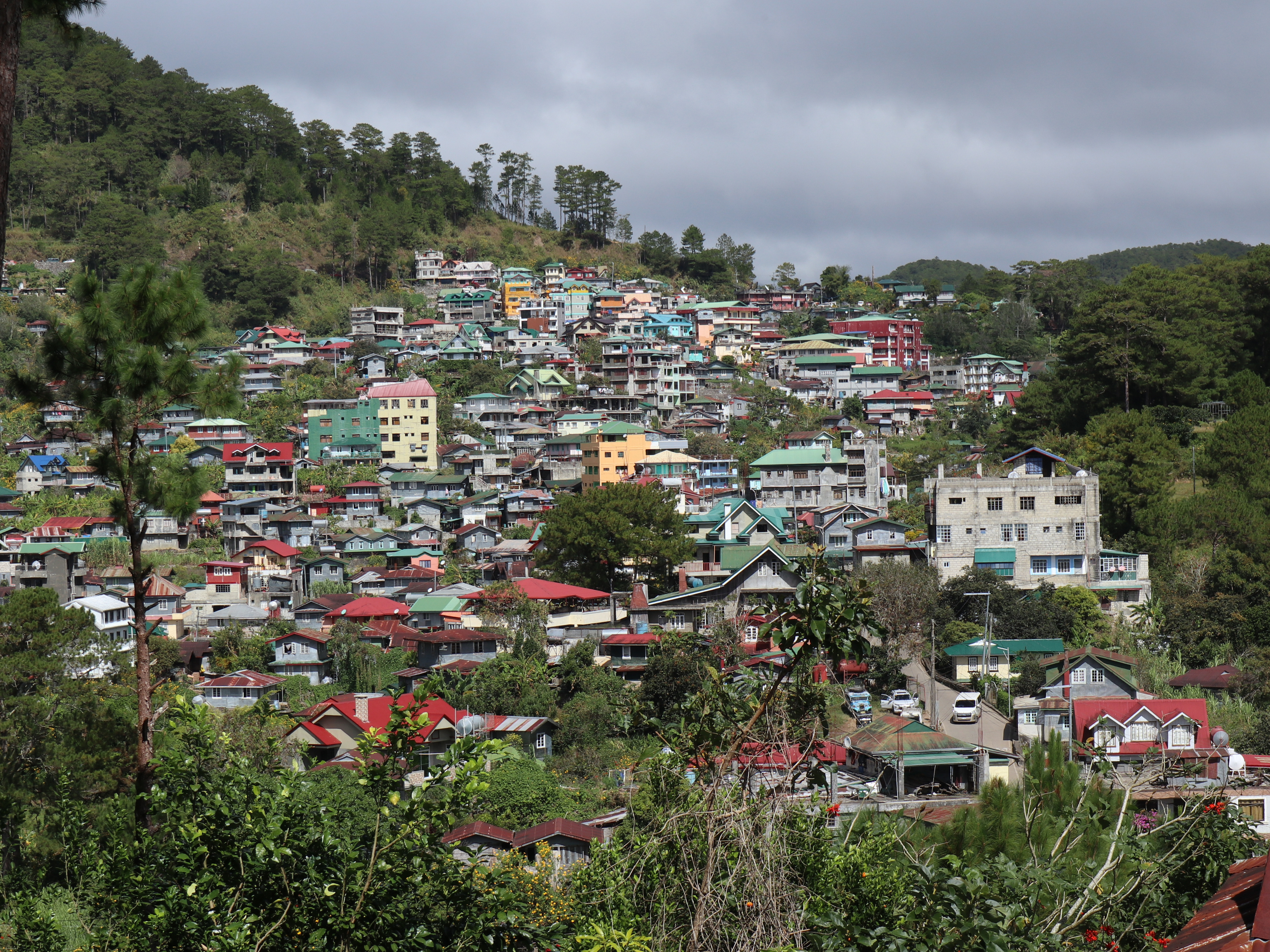
- Sagada in 2022

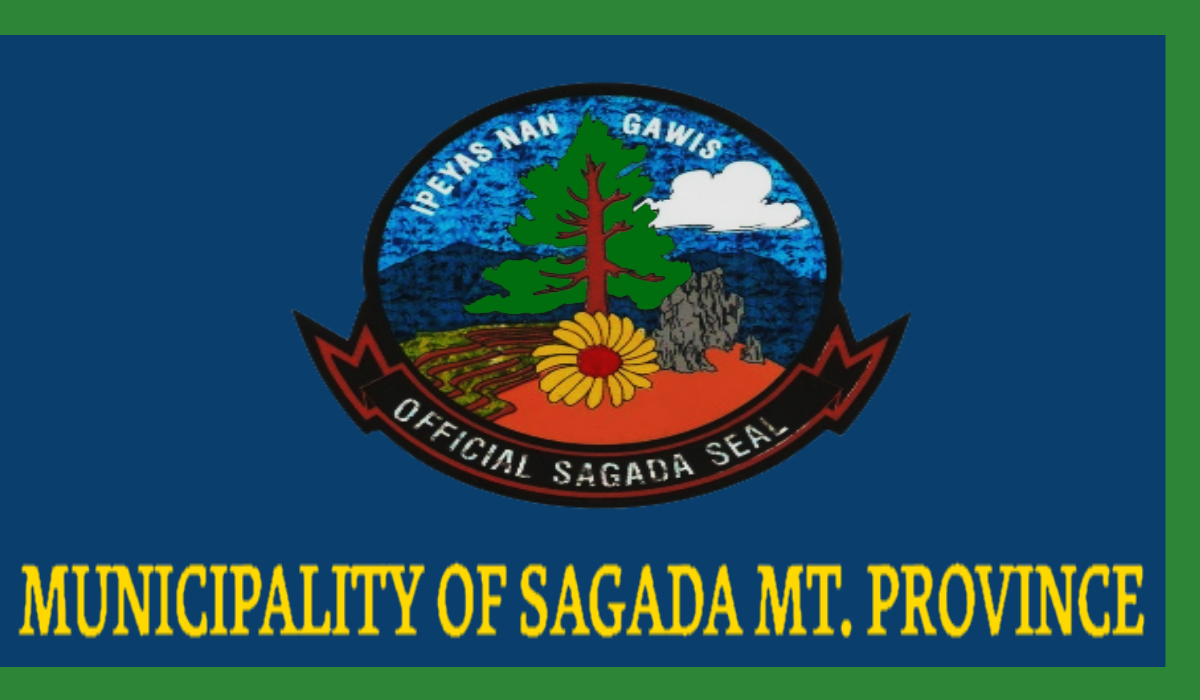
- Flag Seal
- Motto: Ipeyas Nan Gawis
- Anthem: Sagada Hymn
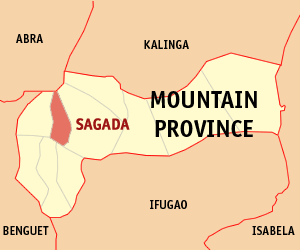
- Map of Mountain Province with Sagada highlighted
- Interactive map of Sagada
- Location within the Philippines
- Coordinates: 17°05′03″N 120°54′03″E
- Country: Philippines
- Region: Cordillera Administrative Region
- Province: Mountain Province
- District: Lone district
- Barangays: 19 (see Barangays)

Government
  - Type: Sangguniang Bayan
  - Mayor: Felicito O. Dula
  - Vice Mayor: David T. Buyagan
  - Representative: Maximo Y. Dalog Jr.
  - Electorate: 9,030 voters (2025)

Area
  - Total: 83.32 km^{2} (32.17 sq mi)
- Elevation: 1,472 m (4,829 ft)
- Highest elevation: 2,374 m (7,789 ft)
- Lowest elevation: 835 m (2,740 ft)

Population (2024 census)
  - Total: 10,702
  - Density: 128.4/km^{2} (332.7/sq mi)
  - Households: 2,798

Economy
  - Income class: 4th municipal income class
  - Poverty incidence: 12.18% (2023)
  - Revenue: ₱ 119.4 million (2024)
  - Assets: ₱ 383.5 million (2024)
  - Expenditure: ₱ 108.6 million (2024)
  - Liabilities: ₱ 148.1 million (2024)

Service provider
  - Electricity: Mountain Province Electric Cooperative (MOPRECO)
- Time zone: UTC+8 (PST)
- ZIP code: 2619
- PSGC: 1404409000
- IDD : area code: +63 (0)74
- Native languages: Bontoc; Balangao; Ilocano; Tagalog; Applai Kankanaey
- Major religions: Episcopal Church of the Philippines
- Website: sagada.gov.ph

Sagada, officially the Municipality of Sagada (Bontok: Ili nan Sagada; Balangao: Babley hen Sagada; Kankanaey: Ili di Sagada; Ilocano: Ili ti Sagada; Tagalog: Bayan ng Sagada; Spanish: Municipio de Sagada) is a municipality in Mountain Province, Philippines. According to the 2024 census, it has a population of 10,702 people.

The town is famous for its hanging coffins. This is a traditional way of burying people that is still utilized. The elderly carve their own coffins out of hollowed logs. If they are too weak or ill, their families prepare their coffins instead. The dead are placed inside their coffins (sometimes breaking their bones in the process of fitting them in), and the coffins are brought to a cave for burial. The Sagada people have been practicing such burials for over 2,000 years, however, not everyone is qualified to be buried this way; among other things, one has to have been married and had grandchildren.

Popular activities include trekking, exploring both caves and waterfalls, spelunking, bonfires, picnics, rappelling, visiting historical sites, nature hikes, and participating in tribal celebrations. Guides can be found upon registration at the tourist-office in Sagada Proper (the main town) for a small fee. Most of the guides are natives, also known as Kankanaey.

== History ==
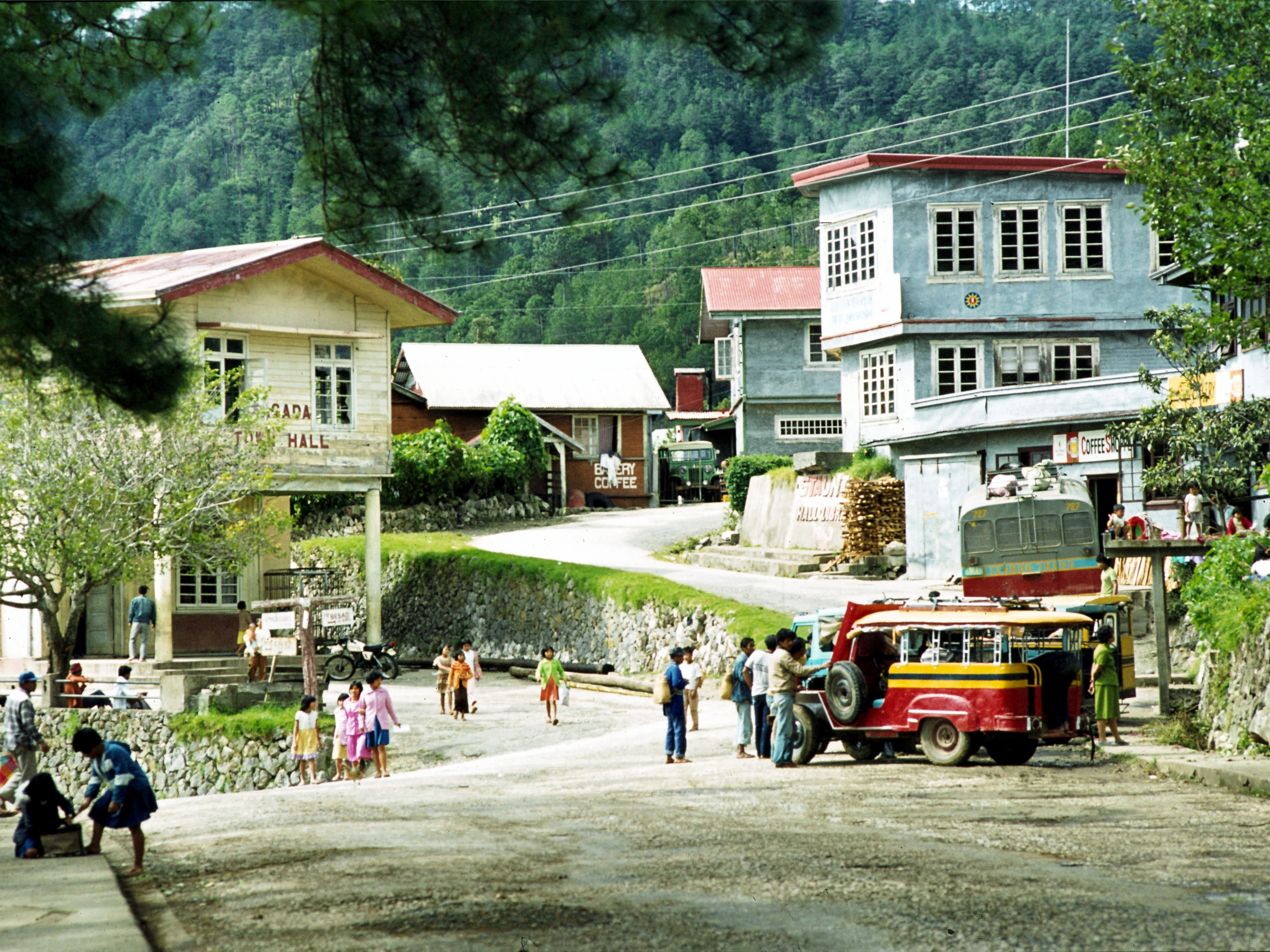
Sagada in 1980

=== Origin legend ===
According to legend, Sagada was founded as an ili or village by Biag, a man from Bika in eastern Abra. The people from Bika were forced out of their ili by raiding headhunters. Biag's family resettled in Candon, Ilocos but when baptism or the giving of names was enforced, Biag's family chose to move back toward the mountains in search for a settlement. Along the way, he and his siblings decided to part ways. A brother, Balay, chose to return to Candon, a sister to Abra. Another brother settled along the upper Abra River. Biag pushed further to the east until he came to what is now Sagada.

=== Arrival of Anglican missionaries ===
Perhaps for lack of transportation and willing guides, few conquistadors set foot in Sagada during the Spanish Era, and a Spanish Mission was not founded until 1882. As a result, it is one of a few places in the Philippines that has preserved its indigenous culture with little Spanish influence.

Anglican missionaries led by Rev. Fr. John Staunton built the Church of Saint Mary the Virgin and founded St. Mary's School, Sagada in 1904.

=== Chico River Dam Project ===
Sagada was one of several municipalities in Mountain Province which would have been flooded by the Chico River Dam Project during the Marcos dictatorship, alongside Bauko, Bontoc, Sabangan, Sadanga, and parts of Barlig. However, the indigenous peoples of Kalinga Province and Mountain Province resisted the project and when hostilities resulted in the murder of Macli-ing Dulag, the project became unpopular and was abandoned before Marcos was ousted by the 1986 People Power Revolution.

In 1983, refugees fleeing the Beew massacre (in which the 623rd Philippine Constabulary burned down Sitio Beew in Tubo, Abra, claiming that they were "rebel sympathizers") were forced to take refuge in the Church of the St. Mary, where they were given succor by Fr. Paul Sagayo Jr. until they could finally be aided by Atty Pablo Sanidad of the Free Legal Assistance Group and journalist Isidoro Chammag of the Bulletin Today (now Manila Bulletin).

== Geography ==
Sagada is nestled in a valley at the upper end of the Malitep tributary of the Chico River some one and a half kilometers above sea level in the Central Cordillera Mountains, enveloped between the main Cordillera Ranges and the Ilocos Range. Mount Data in the south and Mount Kalawitan in the southeast pierce the horizon. Mount Polis, Bessang and Mount Tirad in the east, and Mount Sisipitan in the north mark the Mountain Province–Abra boundary. There are limestone mountains throughout Sagada. This part of Luzon used to be submerged in the ocean tens of millions of years ago, and fossilized seashells can be found in the walls of Sumaguing Cave.

Sagada is situated 18.43 kilometres (11.45 mi) from the provincial capital Bontoc, and 387.56 kilometres (240.82 mi) from the country's capital city of Manila.

=== Barangays ===
Sagada is politically subdivided into 19 barangays. Each barangay consists of puroks and some have sitios.

- Aguid
- Ambasing
- Angkeling
- Antadao
- Balugan
- Bangaan
- Dagdag
- Demang
- Fidelisan
- Kilong
- Madongo
- Nacagang
- Pide
- Poblacion
- Suyo
- Taccong
- Tanulong
- Tetepan Norte
- Tetepan Sur

=== Climate ===
Climate data for Sagada, Mountain Province
| Month | Jan | Feb | Mar | Apr | May | Jun | Jul | Aug | Sep | Oct | Nov | Dec | Year |
|---|---|---|---|---|---|---|---|---|---|---|---|---|---|
| Mean daily maximum °C (°F) | 21 (70) | 20 (68) | 21 (70) | 23 (73) | 24 (75) | 25 (77) | 28 (82) | 24 (75) | 22 (72) | 21 (70) | 20 (68) | 19 (66) | 22 (72) |
| Daily mean °C (°F) | 16 (61) | 14.5 (58.1) | 16 (61) | 17.5 (63.5) | 19 (66) | 20.5 (68.9) | 22 (72) | 19.5 (67.1) | 18 (64) | 17 (63) | 16 (61) | 15 (59) | 17.6 (63.7) |
| Mean daily minimum °C (°F) | 11 (52) | 9 (48) | 11 (52) | 12 (54) | 14 (57) | 16 (61) | 16 (61) | 15 (59) | 14 (57) | 13 (55) | 12 (54) | 11 (52) | 13 (55) |
| Average precipitation mm (inches) | 35 (1.4) | 46 (1.8) | 63 (2.5) | 117 (4.6) | 402 (15.8) | 400 (15.7) | 441 (17.4) | 471 (18.5) | 440 (17.3) | 258 (10.2) | 94 (3.7) | 68 (2.7) | 2,835 (111.6) |
| Average rainy days | 9.9 | 19.5 | 13.9 | 18.9 | 26.0 | 27.3 | 28.9 | 28.5 | 26.1 | 19.7 | 14.5 | 12.8 | 246 |
Source: Meteoblue (modeled/calculated data, not measured locally)

Under the Köppen climate classification, Sagada features a subtropical highland climate (‘’Cwb’’). The area averages 2,835 mm of precipitation annually, the bulk of which falls between the months of May and October. Temperatures are relatively consistent throughout the course with average daily temperatures ranging from around 17 to 20 degrees Celsius.

== Demographics ==
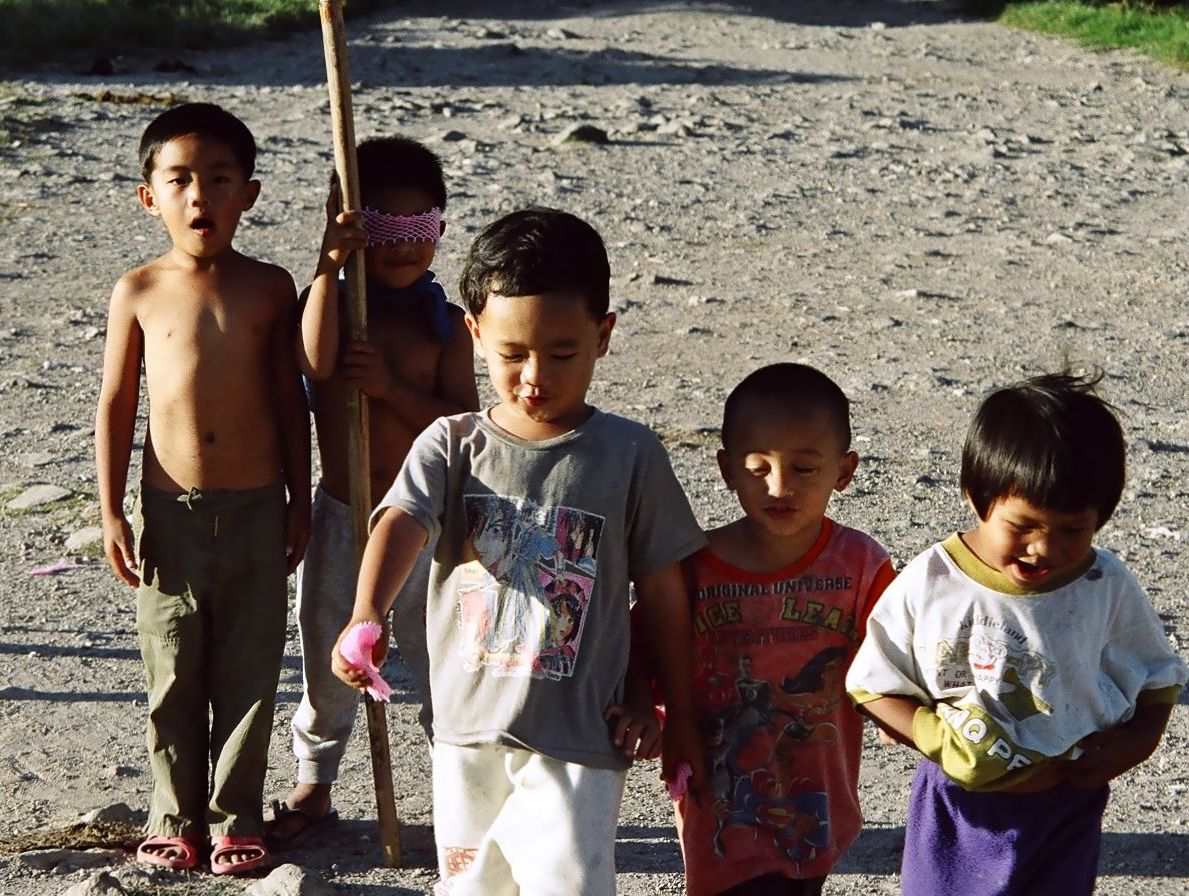
Children in Sagada

Population census of Sagada

| Year | Pop. | ±% p.a. |
|---|---|---|
| 1918 | 6,189 | — |
| 1939 | 7,851 | +1.14% |
| 1948 | 8,472 | +0.85% |
| 1960 | 11,548 | +2.61% |
| 1970 | 12,947 | +1.15% |

| Year | Pop. | ±% p.a. |
|---|---|---|
| 1975 | 8,968 | −7.10% |
| 1980 | 9,460 | +1.07% |
| 1990 | 10,353 | +0.91% |
| 1995 | 10,354 | +0.00% |
| 2000 | 10,575 | +0.45% |

| Year | Pop. | ±% p.a. |
|---|---|---|
| 2007 | 10,930 | +0.46% |
| 2010 | 11,244 | +1.04% |
| 2015 | 11,127 | −0.20% |
| 2020 | 11,510 | +0.71% |
| 2024 | 10,702 | −1.73% |

Source: Philippine Statistics Authority

In the 2024 census, the population of Sagada was 10,702 people, with a density of 130 inhabitants per square kilometer or 340 inhabitants per square mile.

=== Languages ===
Bontoc and Kankanaey are the main languages of Sagada. Ilocano is used as a lingua franca in the municipality.

=== Religion ===
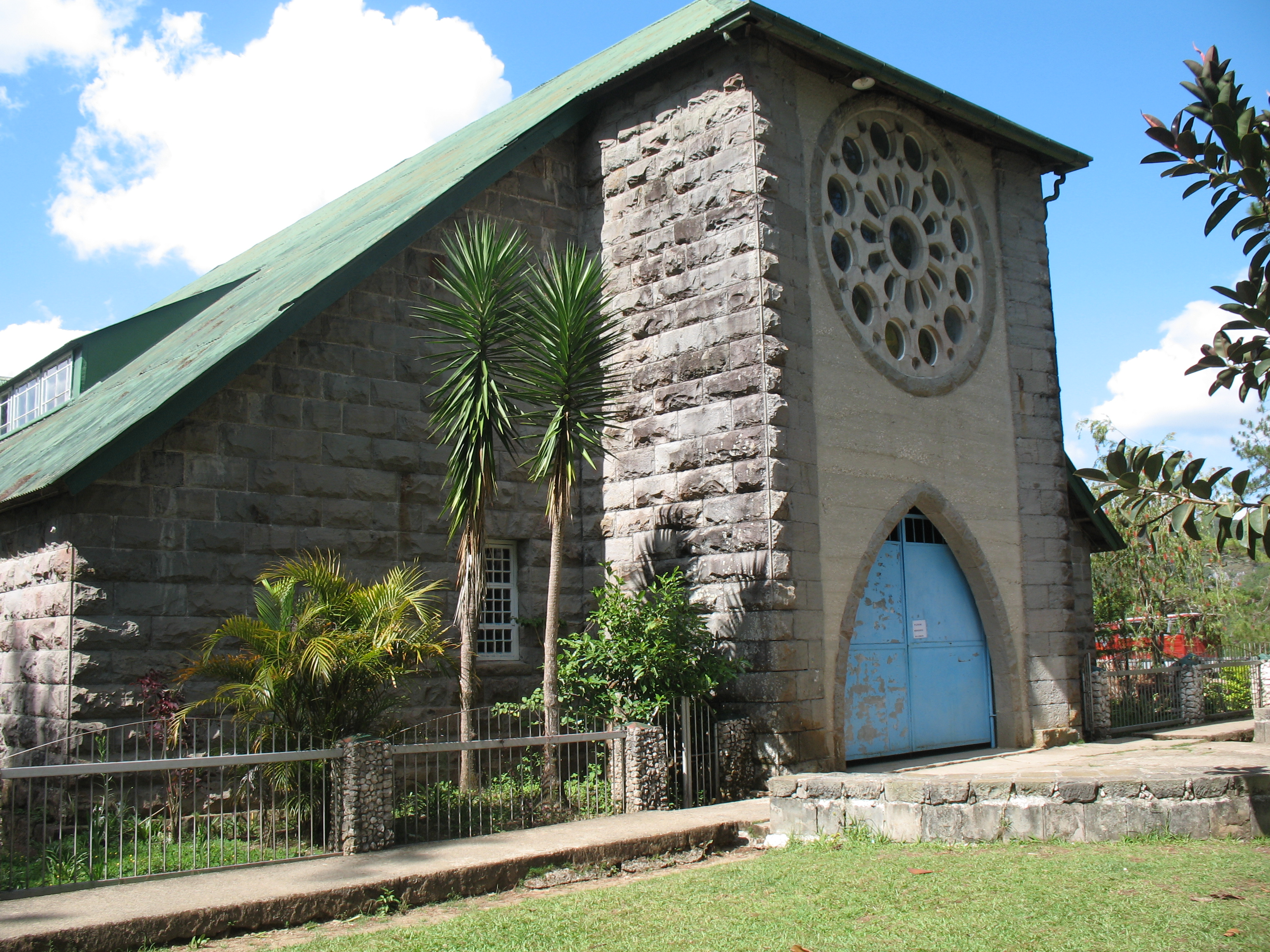
Church of St. Mary the Virgin

Seeing that the Catholic Church in the Philippines has long been established, missionary Charles Henry Brent mentioned that "we are not building an altar over and against another altar," thus focusing Episcopal missionary activity among the Filipino-Chinese in Manila, the tribes in Mindanao and the tribes of northern Luzon. Since the coming of missionaries from the Protestant Episcopal Church in the United States, the municipality of Sagada has become the only Philippine town that is predominantly Anglican with almost 95% baptised into the Episcopal Church of the Philippines (ECP). A known landmark at the centre of town is the Church of St. Mary the Virgin, a vibrant Episcopal parish. In 2004, the ECP celebrated its centennial with much of the festivities centered on the town of Sagada.

== Economy ==
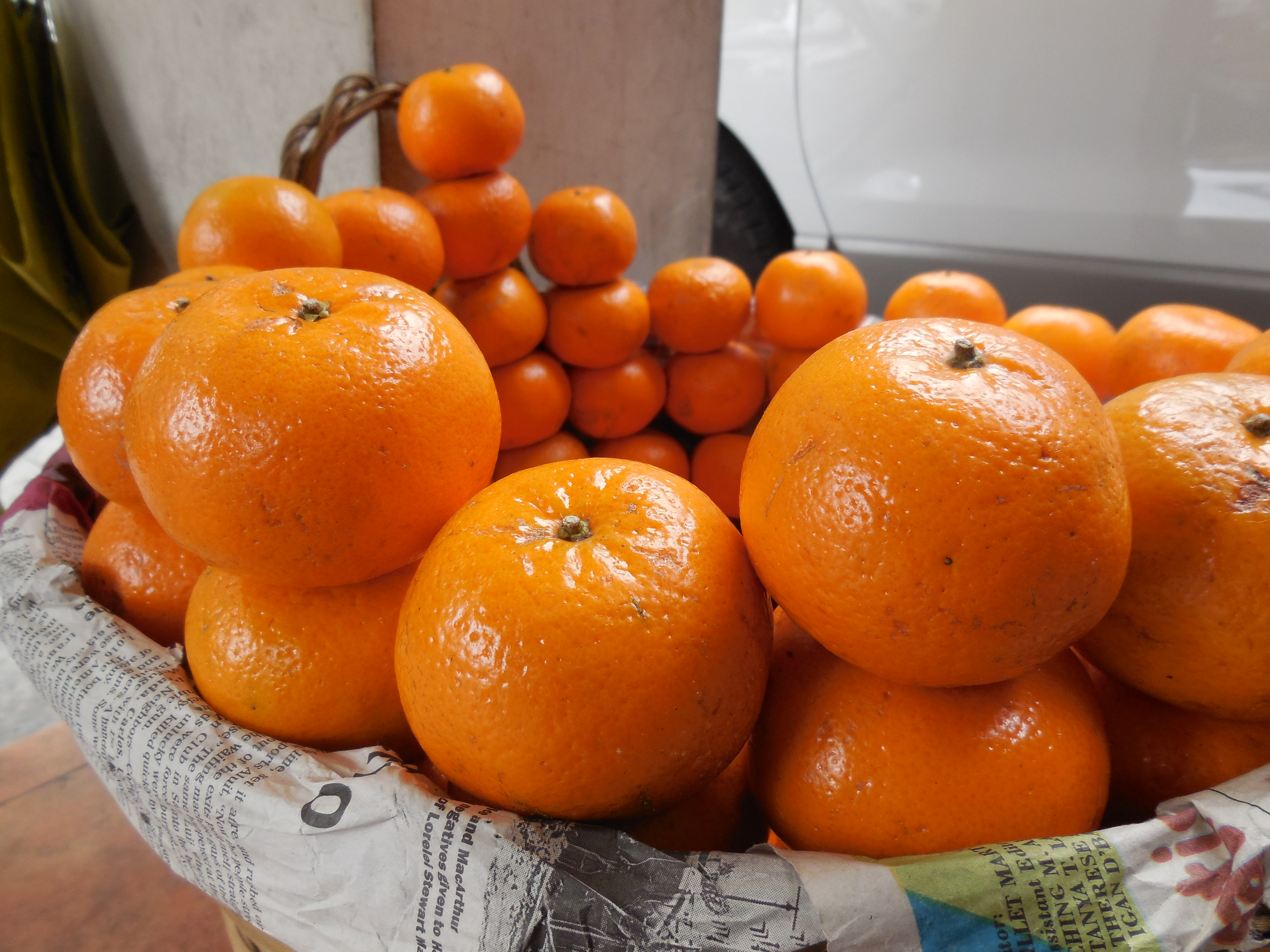
Oranges cultivated in Sagada, being sold at a market in La Trinidad, Benguet

Poverty incidence of Sagada (%)

Source: Philippine Statistics Authority

Since the climate is similar to those of Benguet, its crops are likewise temperate products such as cabbage, tomatoes, green pepper, potatoes, carrots, beans, and others. Between 1882 and 1896, the Spanish colonizers introduced Arabica coffee: a source of income since the American occupation. Citrus, mainly lemon, lime and Valencia oranges were introduced from Spain by Jaime Masferre to provide the needs of American missionaries and employees of the Mission of Saint Mary the Virgin. During the American Period, the Americans introduced products like strawberries, and peaches due to its cooler, highland rainforest climate.

In recent years, tourism has also grown to contribute significantly to the local economy. Inns, restaurants, tour guide services, and other tourism-related industries have also grown rapidly. The municipal government also collects significant amounts through the environmental fee it charges each tourist, as well as through the taxes levied on local businesses.

== Government ==
=== Local government ===
Sagada, belonging to the lone congressional district of the province of Mountain Province, is governed by a mayor designated as its local chief executive and by a municipal council as its legislative body in accordance with the Local Government Code. The mayor, vice mayor, and the councilors are elected directly by the people through an election which is being held every three years.

=== Elected officials ===
Members of the Municipal Council (2025–2028)
| Position | Name |
|---|---|
| Congressman | Maximo Y. Dalog Jr. |
| Mayor | Felicito O. Dula |
| Vice-Mayor | David T. Buyagan |
| Councilors | Paul S. Domoguen |
| Councilors | Joel E. Tocgan |
| Councilors | April Mae C. Pagadian |
| Councilors | Andres B. Aclayan |
| Councilors | Felicito G. Kibatay Jr. |
| Councilors | Kapon B. Gomgom-o |
| Councilors | Andrea D. Taltala |
| Councilors | Alfredo T. Padawil |

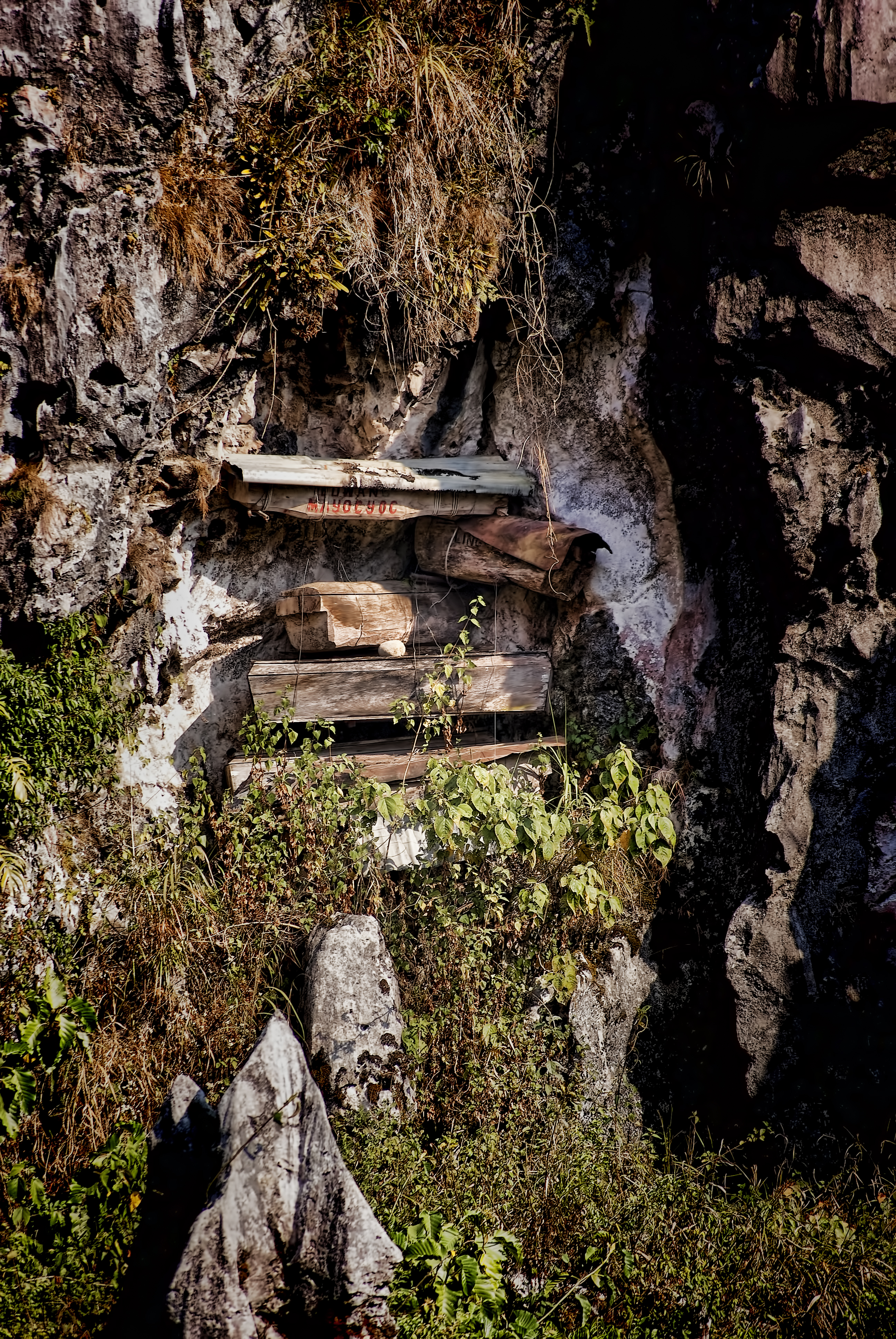
Sagada Hanging Coffins

== Places of interest ==
Sagada has many natural wonders, including:

- Sumaguing and Lumiang Caves
- Bomod-ok and Bokong Falls
- Rice terraces
- Echo Valley
- Kiltepan Tower
- Underground River
- Lake Danum
- Hanging Coffins
- Pongas Falls
- Blue Soil Hills
- Mount Ampacao
- Marlboro Hill
- Fortune Express
- Latang and Matang Caves

Other notable places include:

- The Church of St. Mary the Virgin
- The gravesite of Philippine history scholar William Henry Scott

== In popular culture ==
- Sagada was featured in the Filipino film, Don't Give Up on Us, and That Thing Called Tadhana.
- Sagada was featured in an episode of Locked Up Abroad.
- In the "Death" episode of The Moaning of Life, Karl Pilkington visits Sagada to see a local community's cliffside burial techniques.

== Education ==
The Sagada Schools District Office governs all educational institutions within the municipality. It oversees the management and operations of all private and public, from primary to secondary schools.

=== Primary and elementary schools ===
- Ambasing Elementary School
- Ankileng Elementary School
- Antadao Elementary School
- Balugan Elementary School
- Bangaan Elementary School
- Fidelisan Primary School
- Kilong Primary School
- Nacagang Primary School
- Payag-eo Elementary School
- Sagada Central School
- Taccong Primary School
- Tanulong Elementary School
- Tetepan Elementary School

=== Secondary schools ===
- Ankileng National High School
- Antadao National High School
- Balugan National High School
- Bangaan National High School
- Sagada National High School
- St. Mary's School of Sagada

== Gallery ==
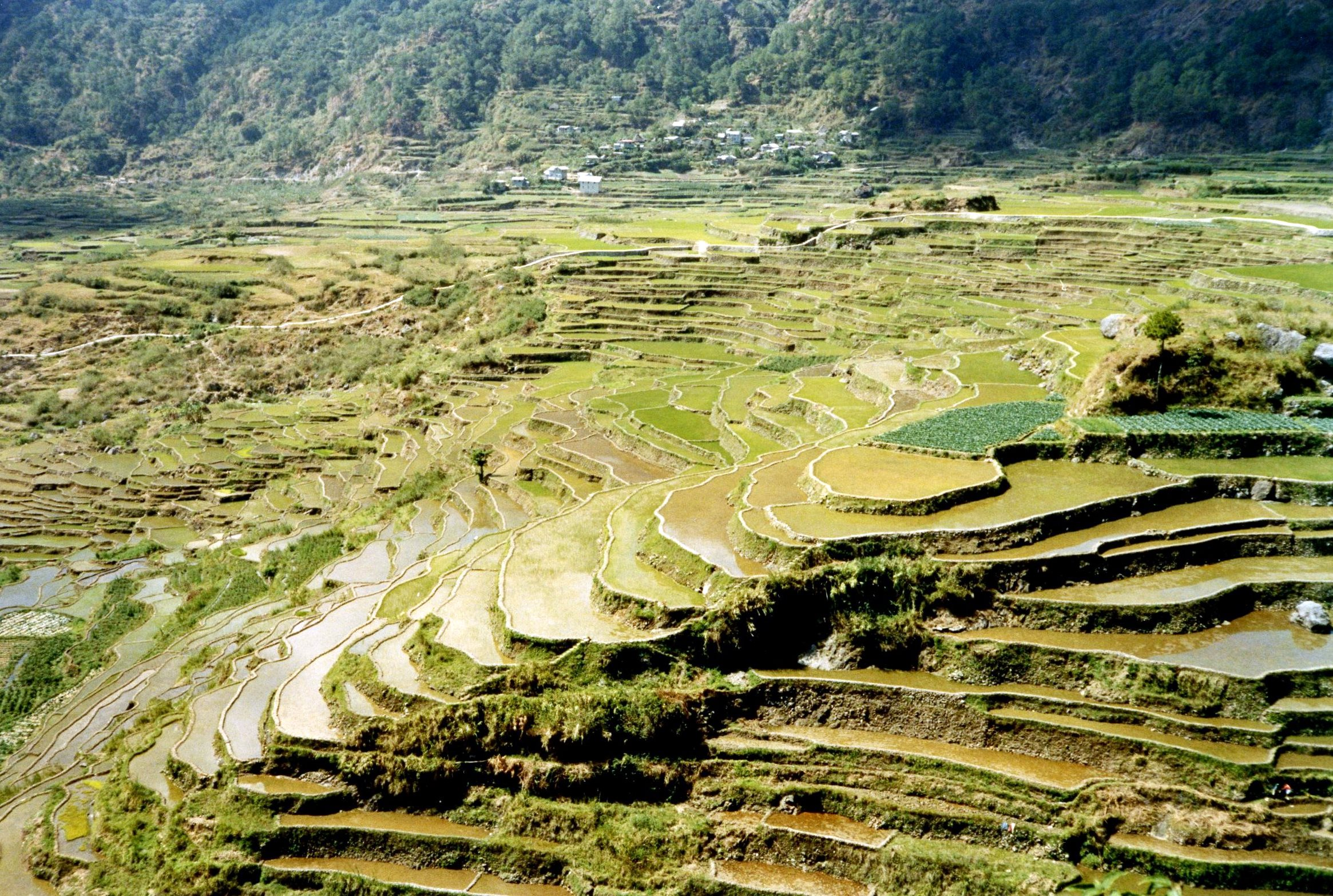
Rice terraces in Sagada

Varieties of Sagada coffee

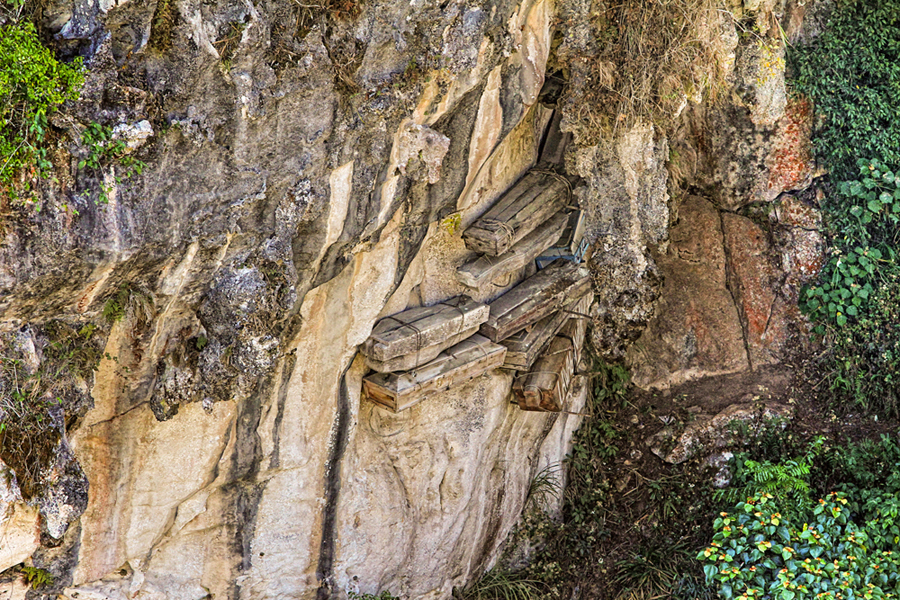
Hanging coffins in Echo Valley

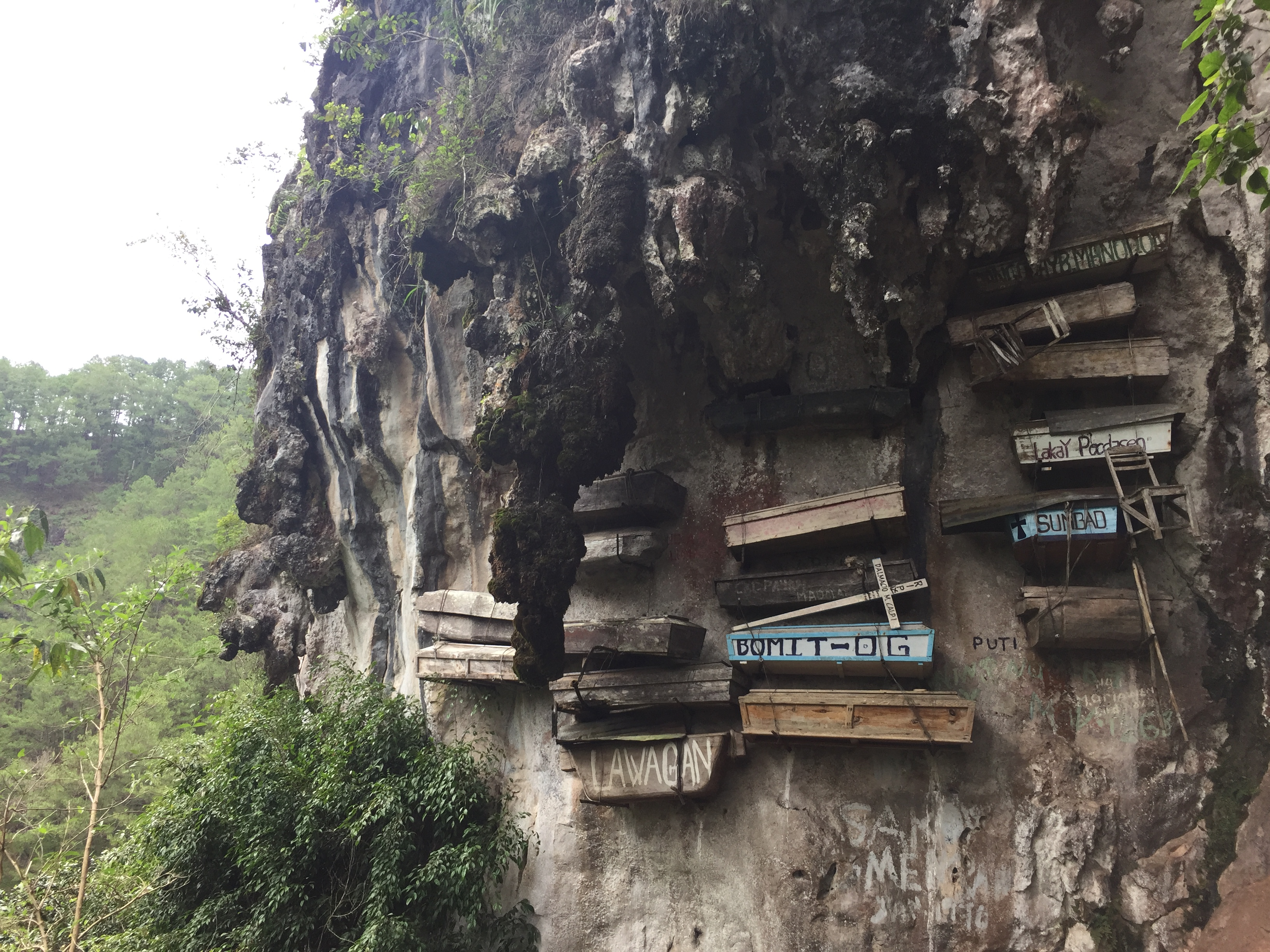
Hanging coffins in Echo Valley

== Notable personalities ==
- Eduardo Masferré - Filipino-Catalan photographer regarded as the Father of Philippine photography.
- William Henry Scott - Historian and Episcopalian missionary best known for numerous books on the Cordilleran peoples and on Precolonial Philippines.
