= Tsokolate =

Filipino hot chocolate

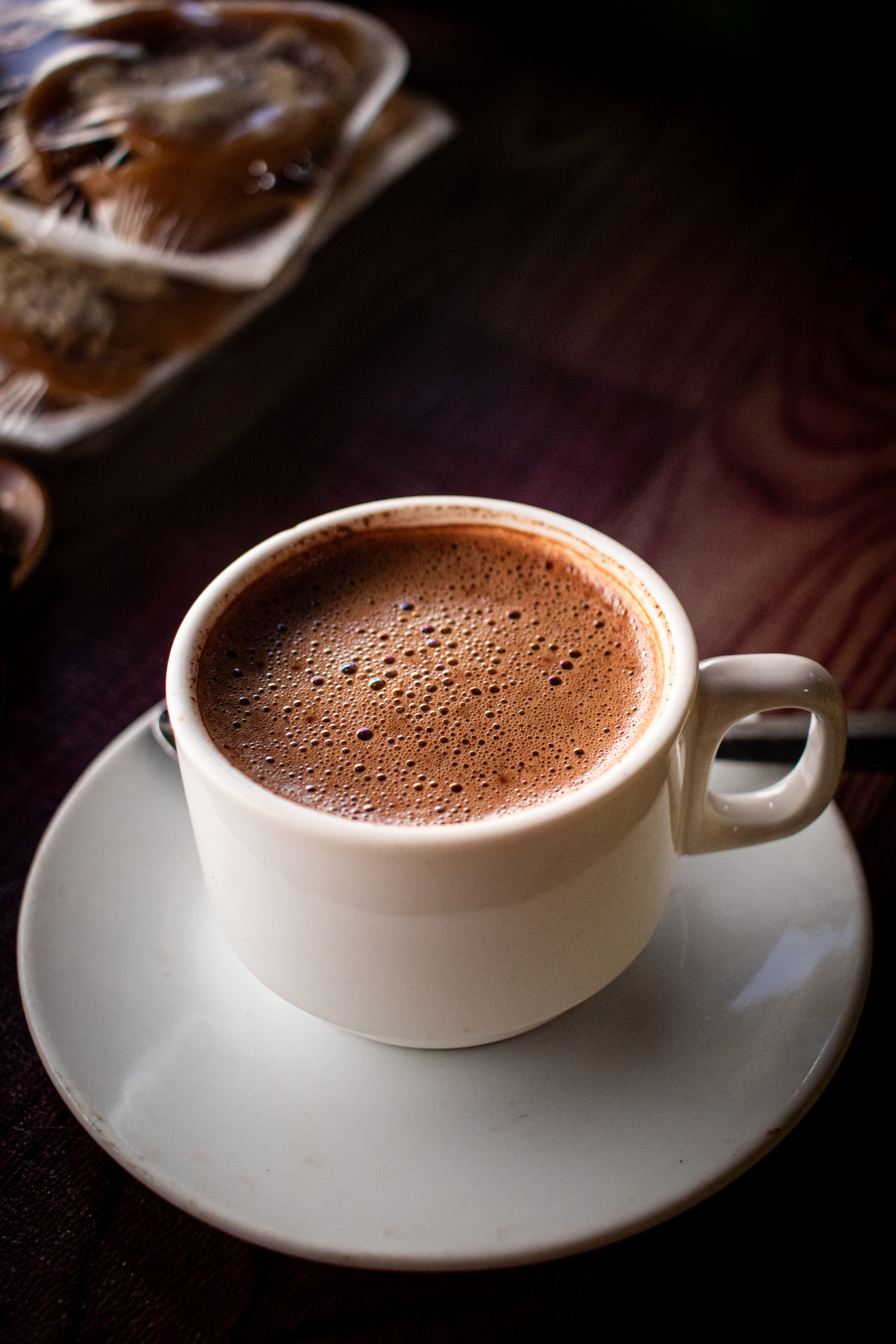
- Origin: Philippines
- Flavor: Chocolate
- Ingredients: Chocolate, milk or water, sugar
- Variants: batirol
- Related products: Hot chocolate

Tsokolate (Tagalog: [tʃoko'late] choh-koh-LAH-teh), also spelled chocolate is a native Filipino thick hot chocolate drink. It is made from tabliya or tablea, tablets of pure ground roasted cacao beans, dissolved in water and milk. Like in Spanish and Mexican versions of hot chocolate, the drink is traditionally made in a tsokolatera and briskly mixed with a wooden baton called the molinillo (also called batidor or batirol), causing the drink to be characteristically frothy. Tsokolate is typically sweetened with a bit of muscovado sugar, and has a distinctive grainy texture.

While today coffee is far more common, tsokolate is traditionally consumed at breakfast and/or merienda (afternoon snack time) as a substitute for or alongside coffee (which it predated in the country), traditionally paired with traditional kakanin delicacies or pandesal and other types of traditional Filipino pastries. It is also popular during Christmas season in the Philippines, particularly among children.

== Names ==
The word tsokolate itself is merely the prescribed formal Tagalog language or Filipino language spelling of both Spanish chocolate and English chocolate, with adjusted orthography to reflect a more native construction (tso vs cho, k vs c) and the latter spelling tends to be more common.

Tsokolate is also known as suklati in Kapampangan; sikulate in Maguindanao; and sikwate or sikuwate in Visayan languages. All are derived from Spanish chocolate ("chocolate"), ultimately from Nahuatl xocolātl.

Tsokolate and these other terms may refer both to the hot chocolate drink or chocolate in general, but in breakfast and merienda contexts, the hot drink is almost always meant.

== Tableya ==
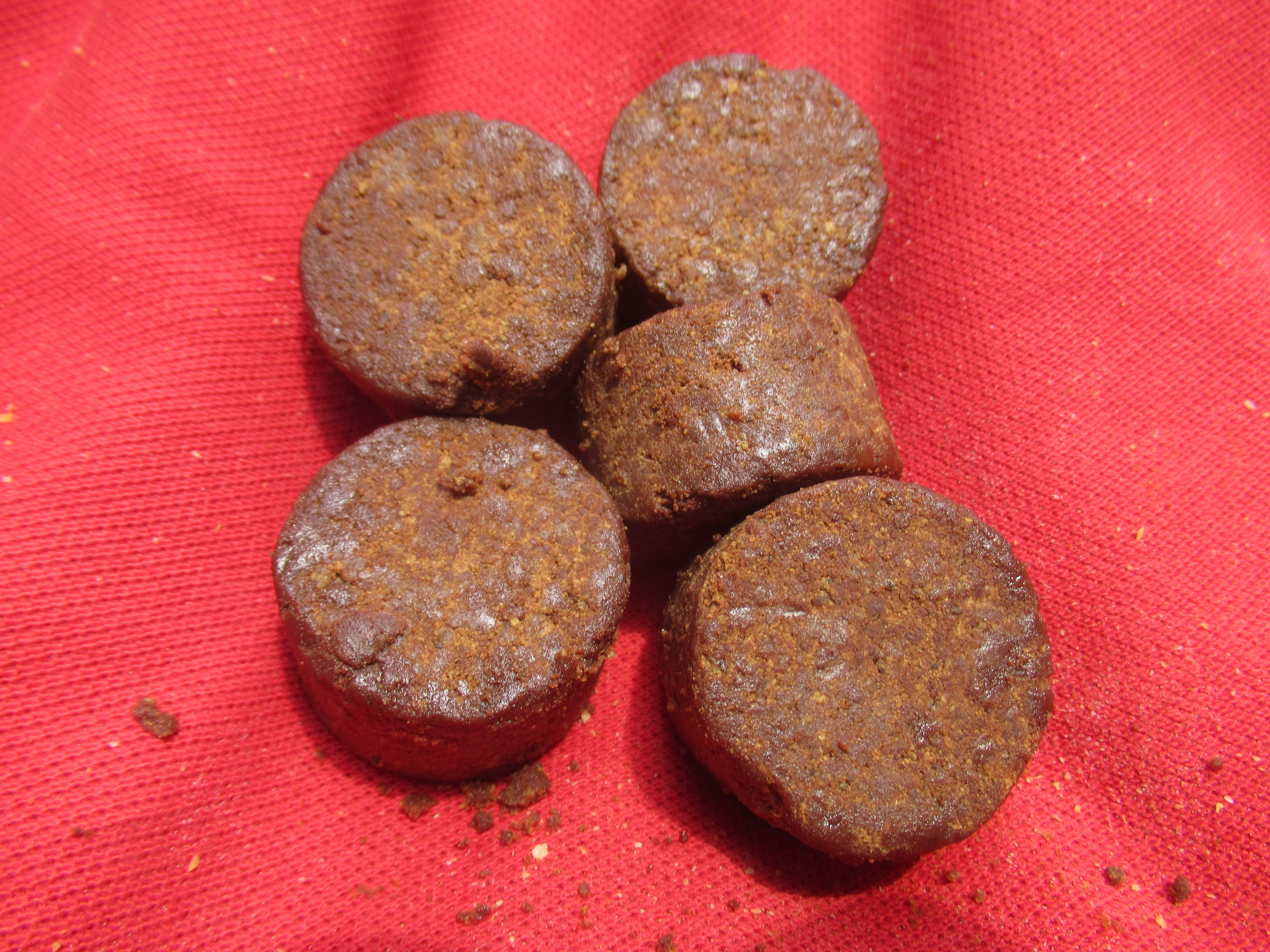
Tsokolate de Ylocos Cacao tableya, from Salcedo, Ilocos Sur

Tableya (also spelled tabliya or tablea, from Spanish tablilla, "tablet") are small traditionally home-made tablets of pure ground roasted cacao beans. Tableya is made by drying beans of ripe cacao fruit for two or three days. The dried beans are shelled and roasted. They are ground into a thick chocolate liquor paste that are then formed into the characteristic little discs or balls and allowed to dry.

Aside from tsokolate, tableya is used in a wide variety of other traditional desserts in the Philippines, most prominently in champorado, a glutinous rice porridge flavored with chocolate.

== Preparation ==
Tsokolate is traditionally prepared by boiling water and milk in a special high-necked pitcher-shaped pot known as a tsokolatera (also tsokolatehan, sikulatihan, sikwatehan, etc.). It is taken off from the flame once bubbles start to form and a few discs of tabliya are dropped into the liquid. Muscovado sugar and more milk or cream is also added, to taste. A special wooden baton called the molinillo (also called batidor or batirol) is then inserted through the top and briskly twirled using the palms of the hands to bring the liquid to a froth. It is then poured into individual cups.

Modern methods of making tsokolate can include using regular whisks, blenders, or milk frothers to achieve the same frothy consistency. Additional ingredients like cinnamon, vanilla, pinipig rice flakes, or even rum or tequila can also be added. However, using commercial cocoa powder instead of tabliya is strongly frowned upon, as it does not give the same texture or taste.

== Cultural significance ==
Tsokolate is commonly consumed at breakfast or merienda with traditional kakanin or bread. Common pairings with tsokolate include pandesal, puto maya, puto bumbong, churros, ensaymada, buñuelos (or cascaron), suman, kesong puti, and bibingka. It is also popular during Christmas season in the Philippines, particularly among children.

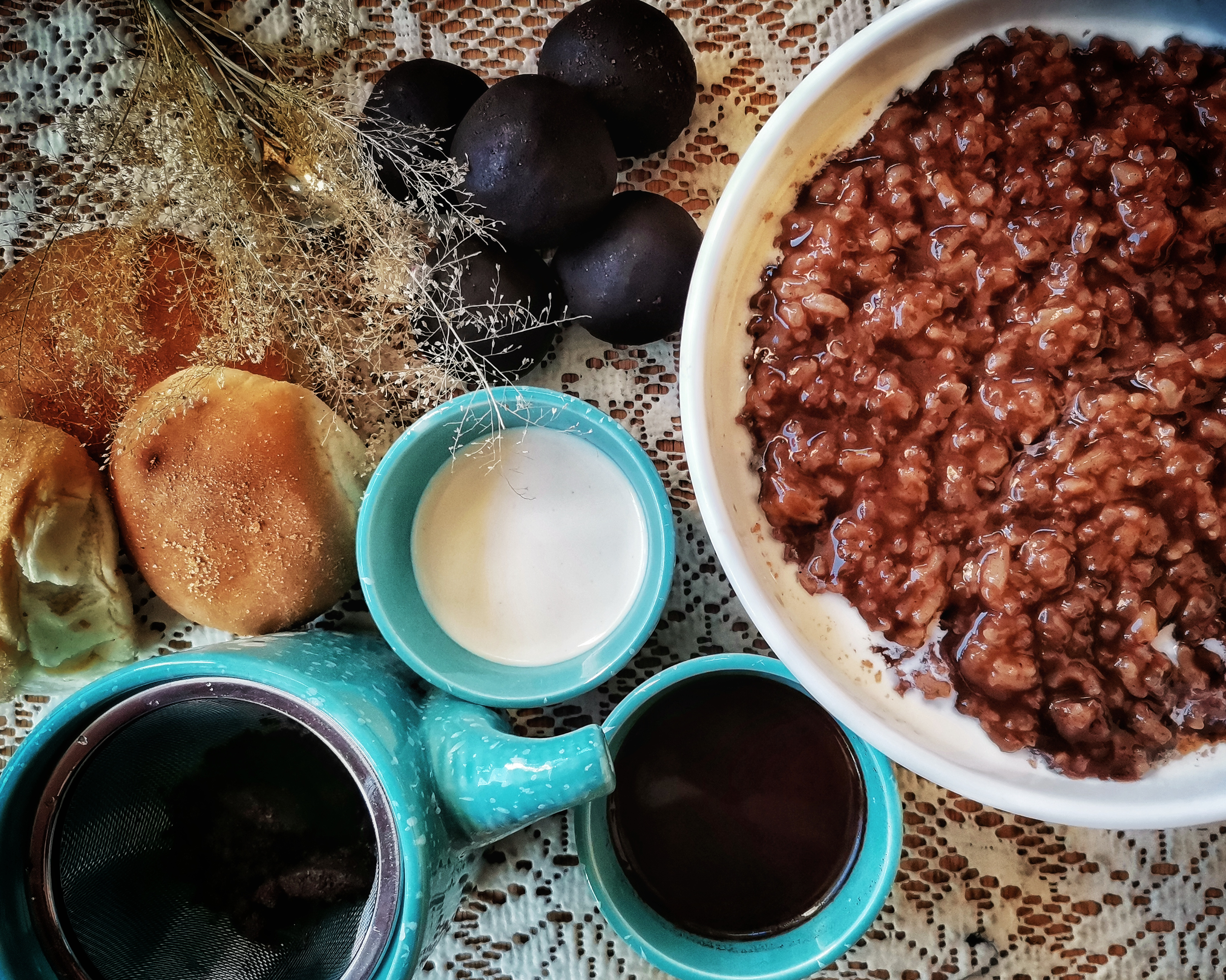
Tableya balls with champorado and tsokolate

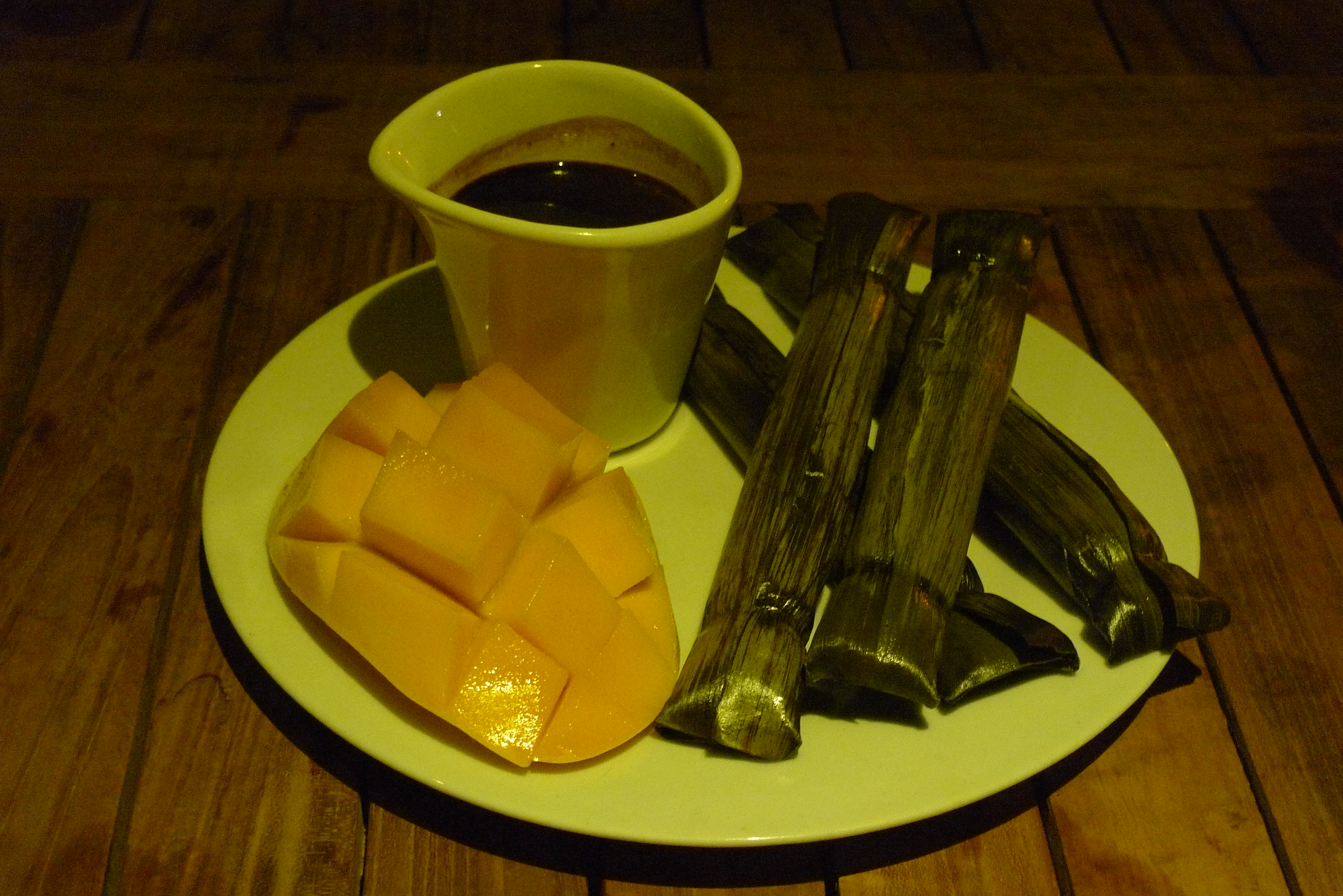
Tsokolate with suman rice cakes and ripe carabao mangoes

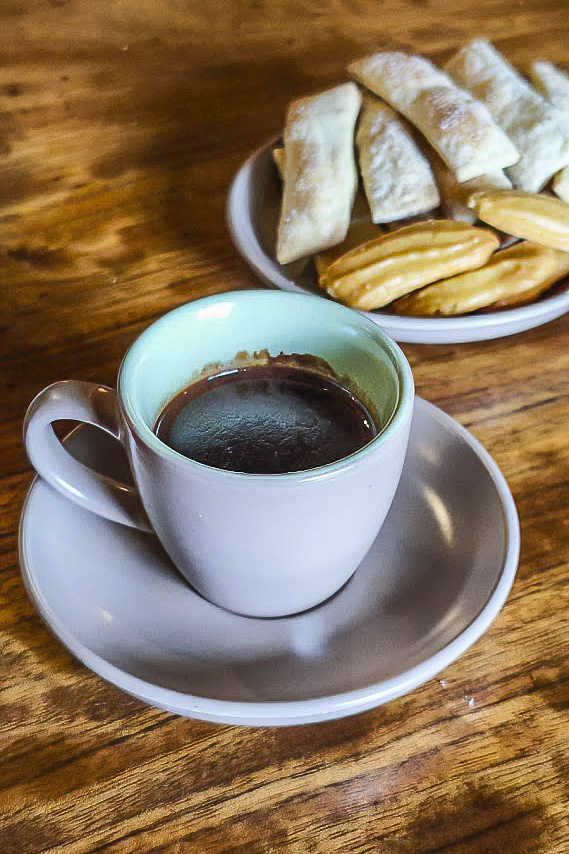
Camiña Balay nga Bato's tsokolate de batirol with ugoy-ugoy from Iloilo

In the novel Noli Me Tangere (1887) by the Philippine national hero, José Rizal, the antagonist character Padre Salvi is alleged by his rival, the alferez of the Guardia Civil, to calculatingly serve thick chocolate (espeso) for important guests and watered-down chocolate (aguado) for guests he deemed unimportant. According to the alferez, Salvi surreptitiously signals his servant to prepare either by saying "make a cup of chocolate, eh?" or "make a cup of chocolate, ah?" - "eh" and "ah" actually being short for espeso and aguado. The narrator states he is unsure if this is just slander because the same story has been told about many priests, or it may be a practice of Salvi's Franciscan Order. Following Rizal, the terms "Chocolate Eh" and "Chocolate Ah" have been adopted by some establishments.

== See also ==
- Kinutil
- Champorado
- Chocolate industry in the Philippines
- Kapeng barako
- List of chocolate drinks
