= Food heritage =

Food heritage is a term that encompasses the origins of plants and animals and their dispersal, the sites where people first cultivated plants and domesticated animals, as well as the earliest locations around the world where people first processed, prepared, sold and ate foods. These locations include farms, all types of mill, dairies, orchards, vineyards, breweries, restaurants and cafes, markets and groceries, hotels and inns. Food museums helps to preserve global and local food heritage. Agropolis Museum in Montpellier, France is an example of a food museum.
