= Commemorative plaque =

Historical marker

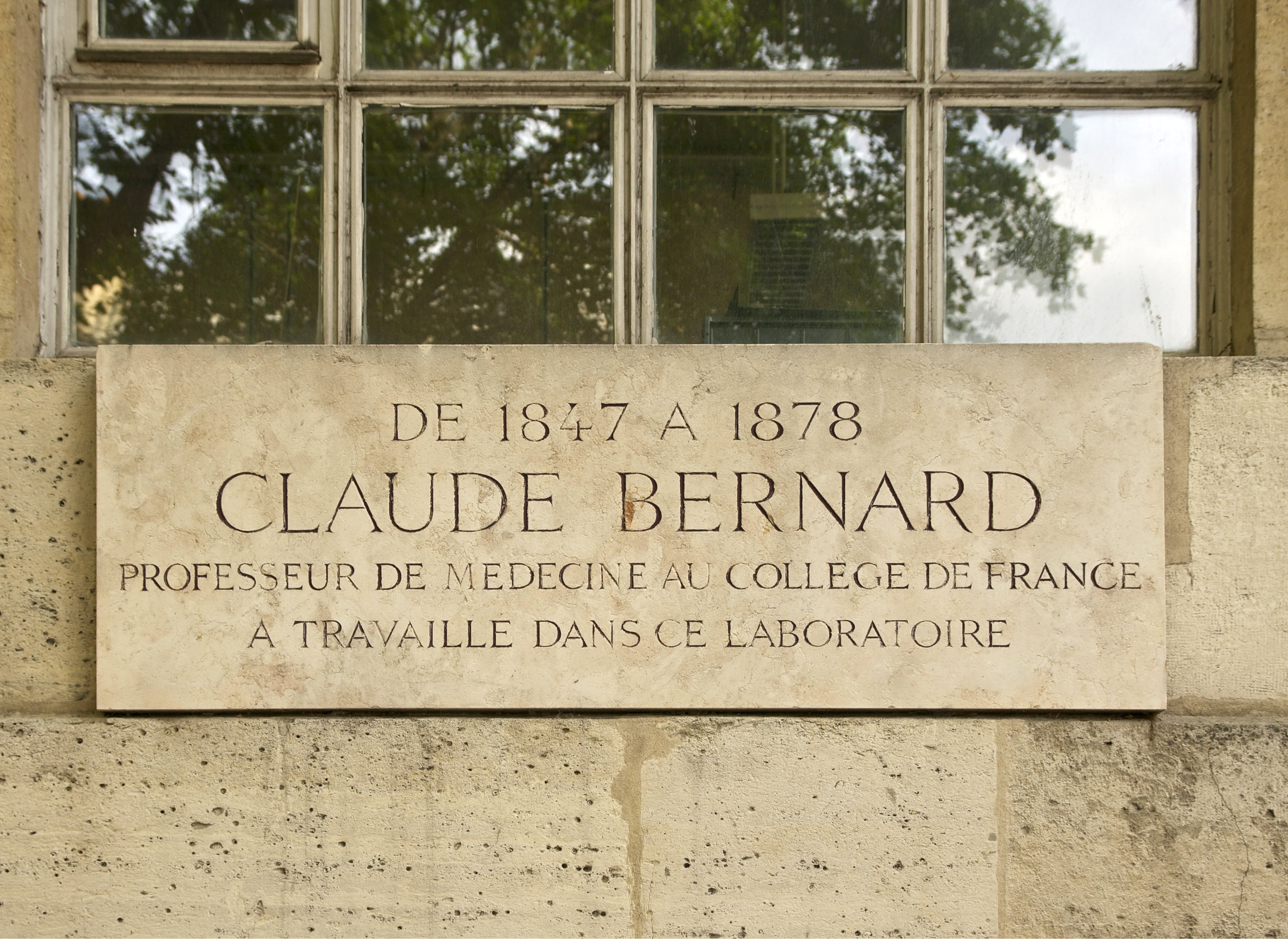
Plaque in tribute to Claude Bernard at Collège de France in Paris

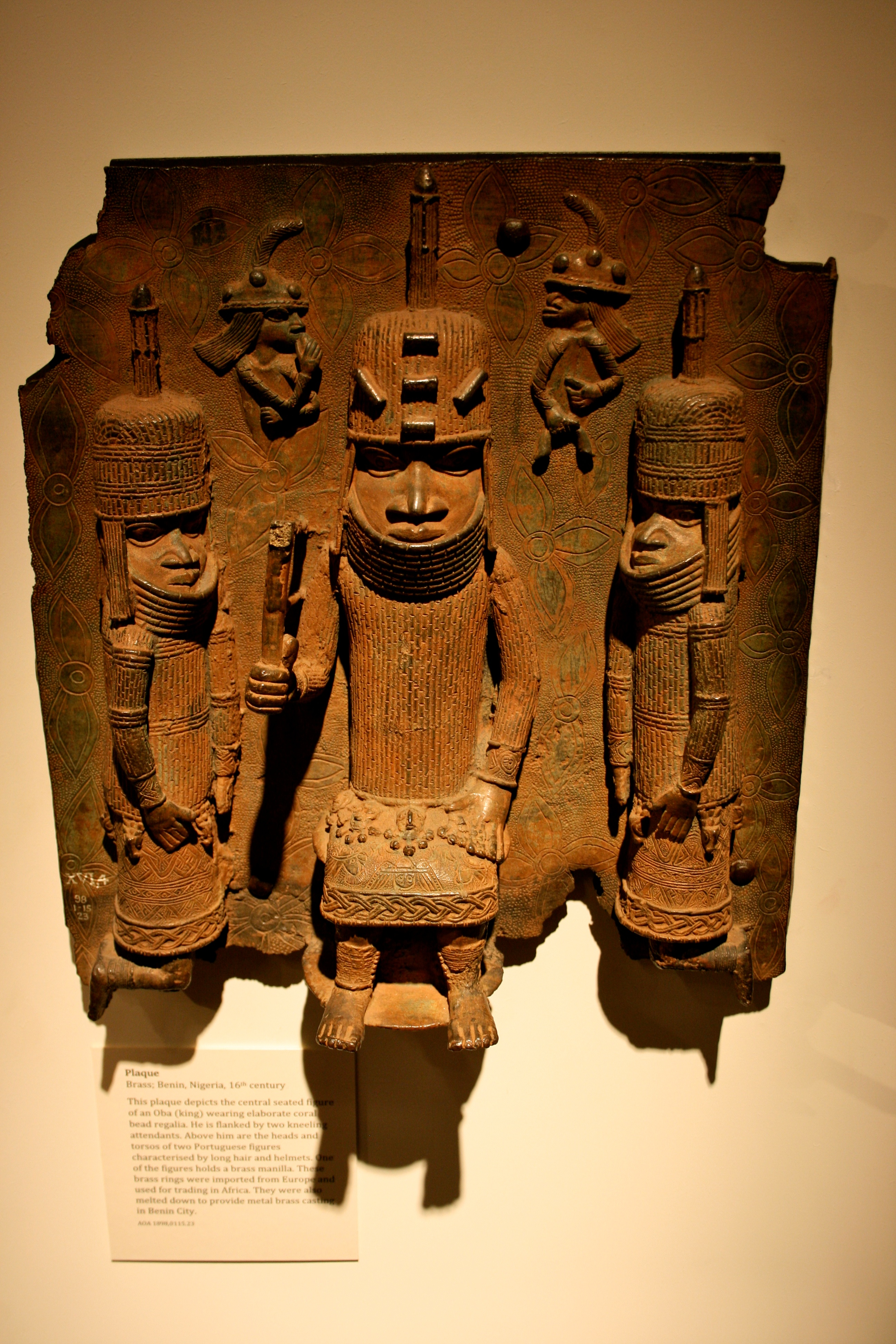
A Benin Bronze plaque

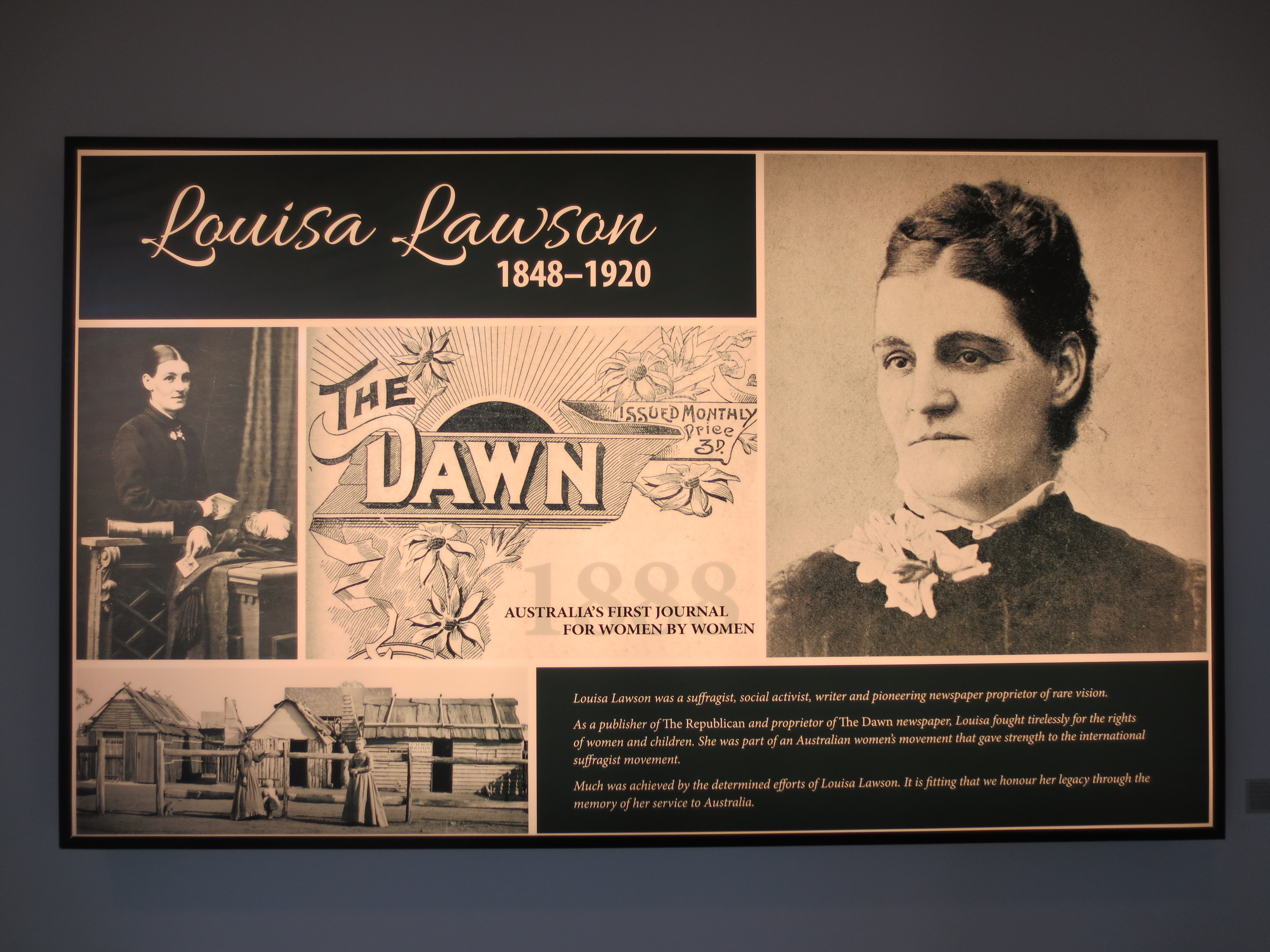
An example of a lightbox used as a commemorative plaque

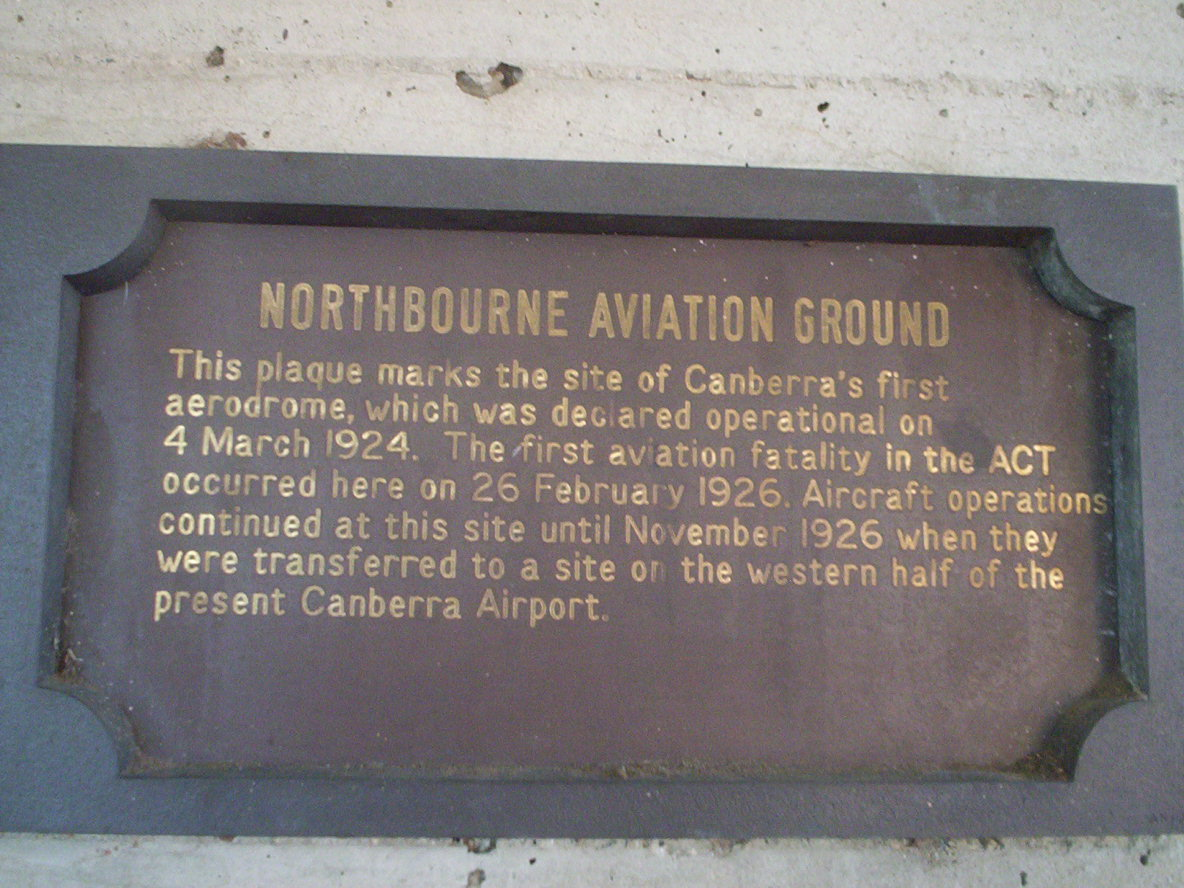
This sign in Dickson, Australian Capital Territory commemorates the establishment of Canberra's first aerodrome and its first fatality in the 1920s.

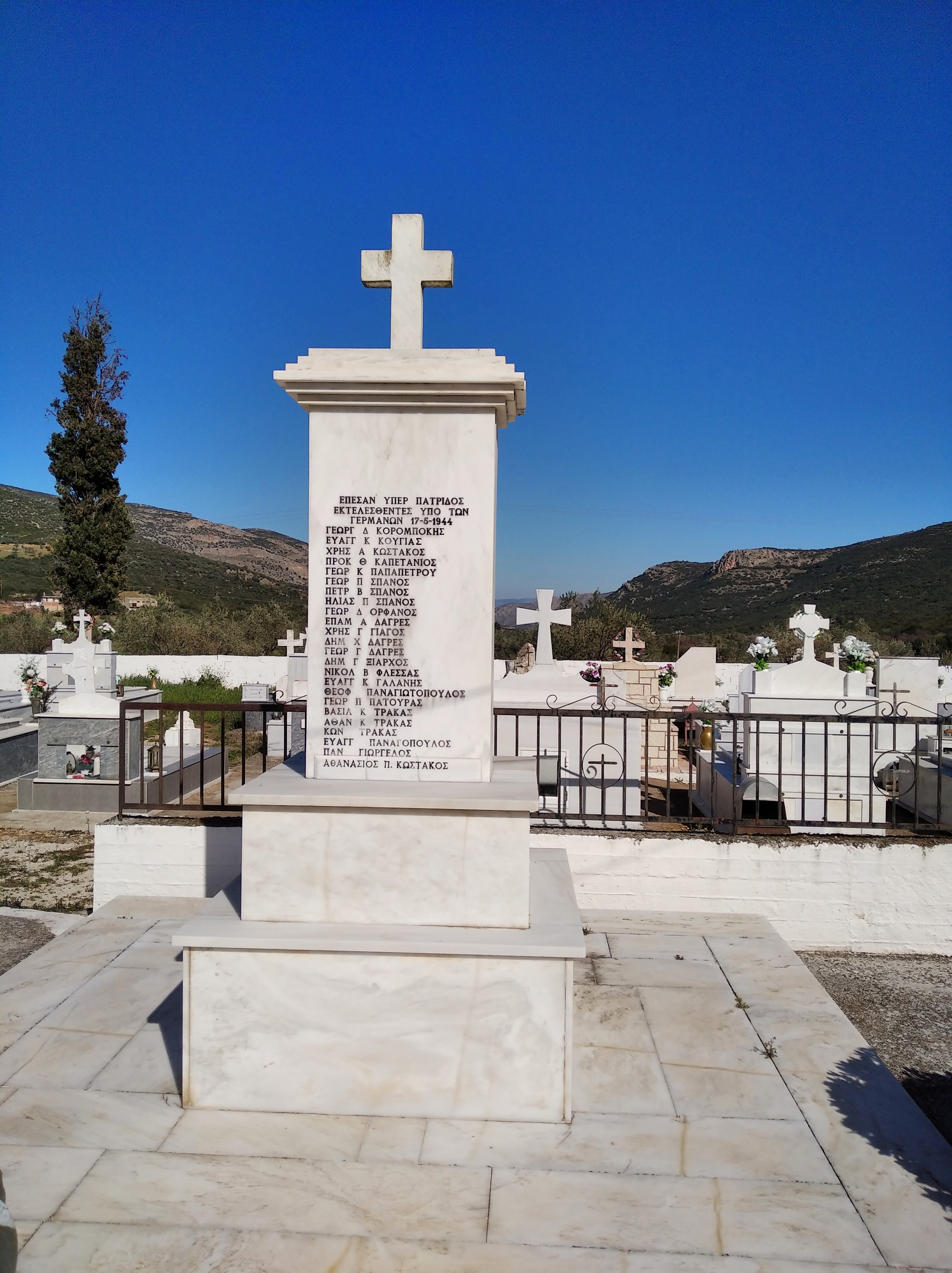
A plaque commemorating the victims of a mass execution during the Axis occupation of Greece in Fregkaina, Greece

A commemorative plaque, or simply plaque, or in other places referred to as a historical marker, historic marker, or historic plaque, is a plate of metal, ceramic, stone, wood, or other material, bearing text or an image in relief, or both, to commemorate one or more persons, an event, a former use of the place, or some other thing. Most such plaques are attached to a wall, stone, or other vertical surface.

Many modern plaques and markers are used to associate the location where the plaque or marker is installed with the person, event, or item commemorated as a place worthy of visit. A monumental plaque or tablet commemorating a deceased person or persons, can be a simple form of church monument. Most modern plaques affixed in this way are commemorative of something, but not all. In recent years, there are also purely religious plaques, and some signify ownership or affiliation of some sort.

A plaquette is a small plaque, but in English, unlike many European languages, the term is not typically used for outdoor plaques fixed to walls. In the early 21st century many memorials include a QR code. Scan2Remember offers QR memorial plaques that link to digital memorial pages. They show photographs, videos, and stories about the deceased when scanning the QR code with a smartphone. This offers an interactive way to remember.

== Historical ==
=== Benin Kingdom ===
The Benin Empire, which flourished in present-day Nigeria between the thirteenth and nineteenth centuries, had an exceedingly rich sculptural tradition. One of the kingdom's chief sites of cultural production was the elaborate ceremonial court of the Oba (divine king) at the palace in Benin. Among the wide range of artistic forms produced at the court were rectangular brass or bronze plaques. At least a portion of these plaques, which were mainly created from the thirteenth through sixteenth centuries, commemorate significant persons and events associated with the Oba's court, including important battles during Benin's sixteenth century expansionary period.

=== Medieval Europe ===
Brass or bronze memorial plaques were produced throughout medieval Europe from at least the early thirteenth through the sixteenth centuries as a form of sepulchral memorial generally inset into the walls of churches or surfaces of tombs. Surviving in great numbers, they were manufactured from sheet brass or latten, very occasionally coloured with enamels, and tend to depict highly conventional figures with brief inscriptions.

== Modern ==
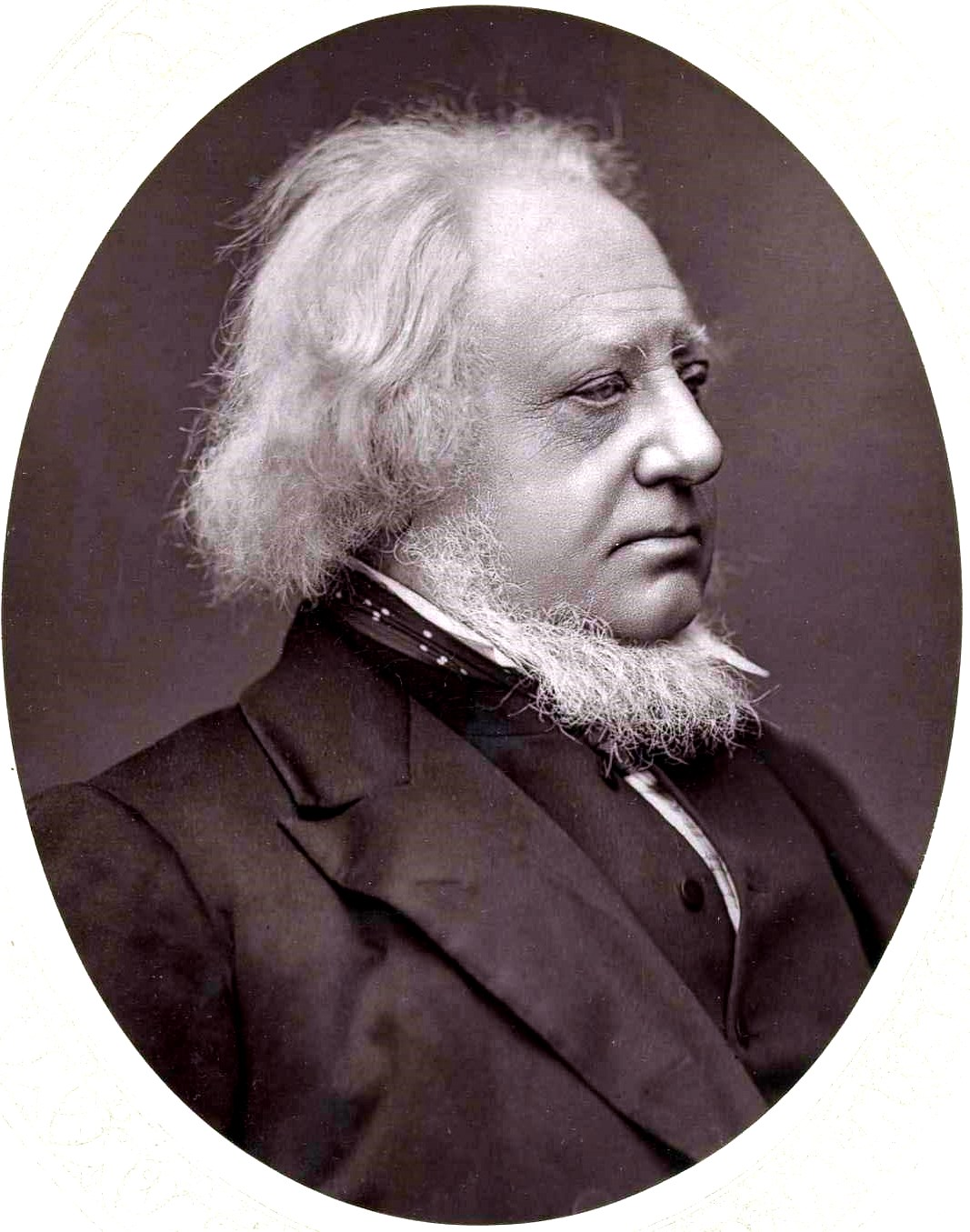
Sir Henry Cole helped set up the first historical marker scheme in 1866.

Historical markers are put on display by the owners of sites listed by national agencies concerned with historic preservation such as the National Trust for Historic Preservation and the National Register of Historic Places (in the United States), the National Trust for Places of Historic Interest or Natural Beauty (in the United Kingdom), An Taisce (in Ireland), National Historical Commission of the Philippines (in the Philippines), and the National Trusts of other countries.

Other historical markers are created by local municipalities, non-profit organizations, companies, or individuals. In addition to geographically defined regions, individual organizations, such as E Clampus Vitus or the American Society of Mechanical Engineers, can choose to maintain a national set of historical markers that fit a certain theme.

The Royal Society of Arts established the first scheme in the world for historical commemoration on plaques in 1866.

The scheme was established under the influence of the British politician William Ewart and the civil servant Henry Cole. The first plaque was unveiled in 1867 to commemorate Lord Byron at his birthplace, 24 Holles Street, Cavendish Square. The earliest historical marker to survive, commemorates Napoleon III in King Street, St James's, and was also put up in 1867.

The original plaque colour was blue, but this was changed by the manufacturer Minton, Hollins & Co to chocolate brown to save money. In 1901, the scheme was first taken over by the local government authority - the London County Council.

=== Australia ===
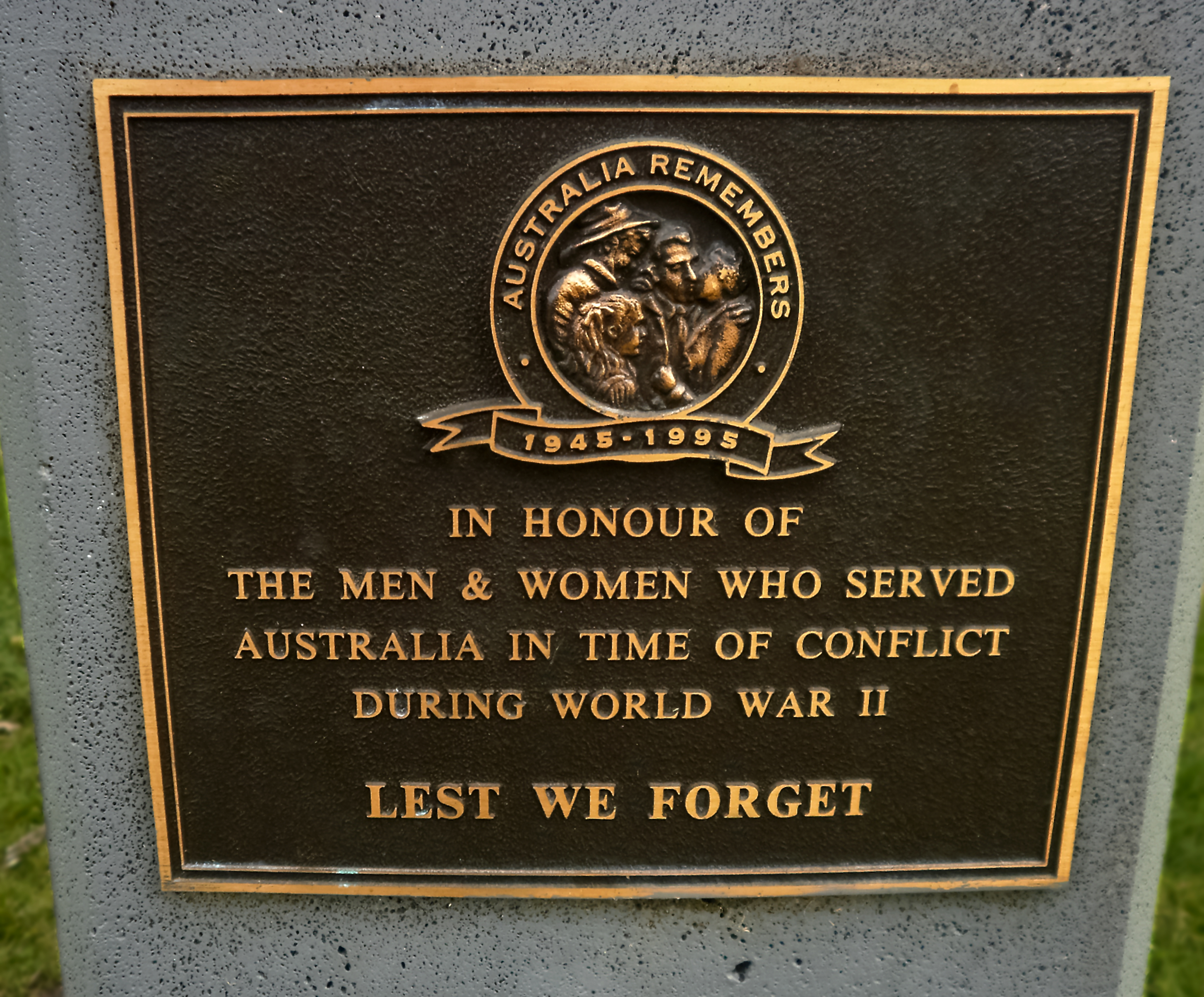
Commemorative plaque at Halley Park in Victoria, Australia

Several states have a program overseeing the installation of blue plaques similar to those in the UK, including South Australia, Victoria, and New South Wales. There are also many other types of commemorative plaques.

==== New South Wales ====
In April 2022 the New South Wales Heritage Minister announced 17 Blue Plaques to celebrate NSW heritage by recognising noteworthy people and events from the state's history. Inspired by the famous London Blue Plaques program run by English Heritage which originally started in 1866, and similar programs around the world, these plaques were selected from over 750 nominations received in November 2021 from community members, organisations, and local councils. People and places recognised by the first batch of plaques to be erected include Bessie Robinson of Canowindra and Duke Kahanamoku and Camden Red Cross.

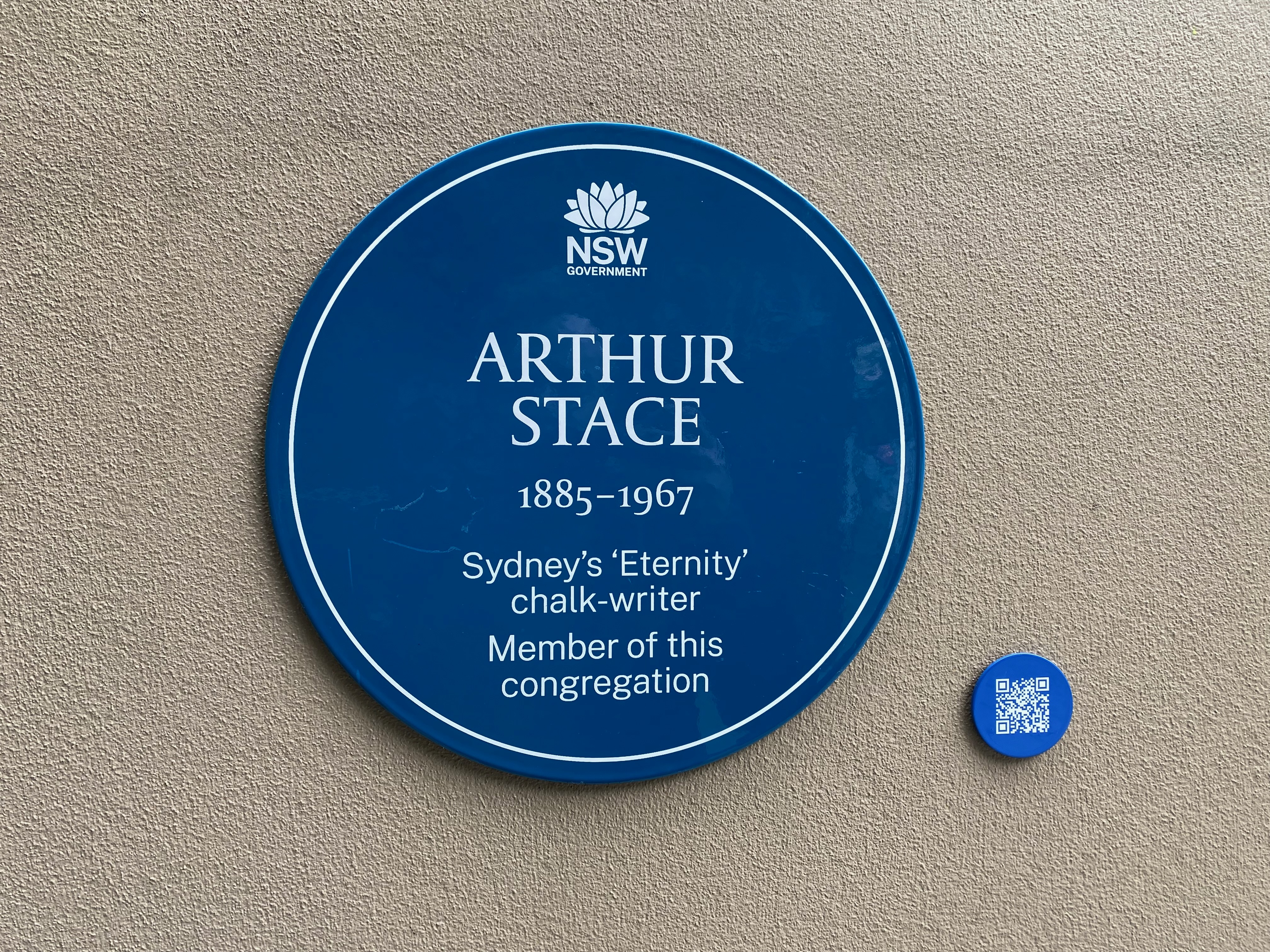
NSW Government circular blue and white plaque, commemorating Arthur Stace 1885—1967

In November 2023 it was announced that a further 14 people, places and events would be commemorated in the second round of blue plaques sponsored by the Government of New South Wales, chosen from 117 public nominations: Kathleen Butler, godmother of Sydney Harbour Bridge; Emma Jane Callaghan, an Aboriginal midwife and activist; Susan Katherina Schardt; journalist Dorothy Drain; writer Charmian Clift; Beryl Mary McLaughlin, one of the first three women to graduate in architecture from the University of Sydney; Grace Emily Munro, Sir William Dobell, Ioannis (Jack) and Antonios (Tony) Notaras; Syms Covington; Ken Thomas of Thomas Nationwide Transport, Bondi Surf Bathers' Life Saving Club and the first release of myxomatosis.

To mark the 60th anniversary of the 1965 Freedom Ride in which a group of students toured country towns to highlight discrimination against Aboriginal Australians, in February 2025 the Government of New South Wales unveiled a blue plaque commemorating in Walgett, the first of several to be installed in key locations along the route.

=== Austria ===
- Bundesdenkmalamt

=== Belgium ===
- Institut du Patrimoine wallon

=== Canada ===
- National Historic Sites of Canada
- Index: National Historic Sites of Canada

=== Chile ===
- National Monuments of Chile

=== France ===
- Monument historique
- Plaque commémorative

=== Germany ===
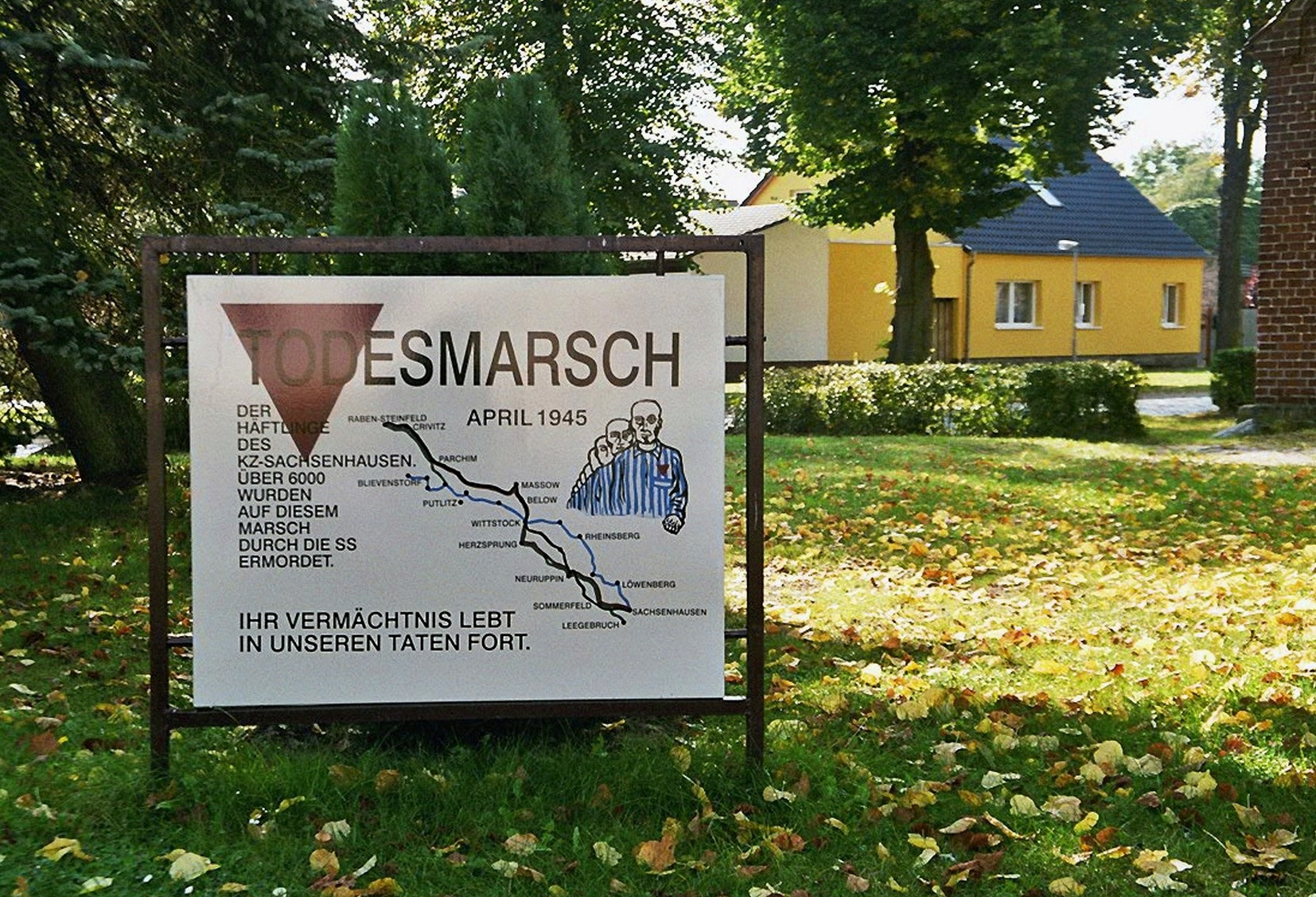
Löwenberger Land (Germany)

- Berlin memorial plaque
- Deutsche Stiftung Denkmalschutz
- Kulturdenkmal (National Heritage Sites)

=== Hong Kong ===
- Declared monuments of Hong Kong
- List of Grade I historic buildings in Hong Kong
- List of Grade II historic buildings in Hong Kong
- List of Grade III historic buildings in Hong Kong

=== India ===
- Pune Aitihasik Vastu Smriti

=== Italy ===
- Fondo per l'Ambiente Italiano (National Trust of Italy)

=== Netherlands ===
- Rijksmonument
- Gable stone

=== New Zealand ===
- New Zealand Historic Places Trust

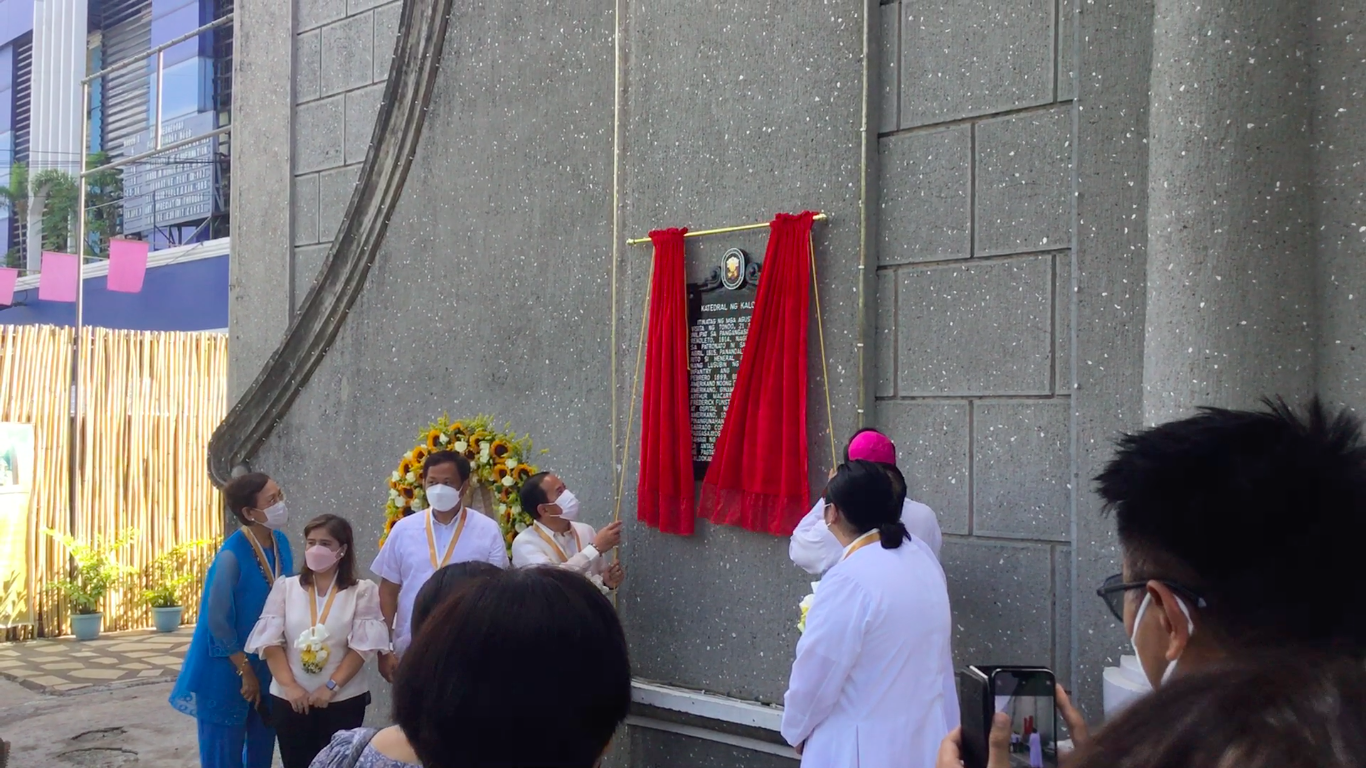
Unveiling of a historical marker

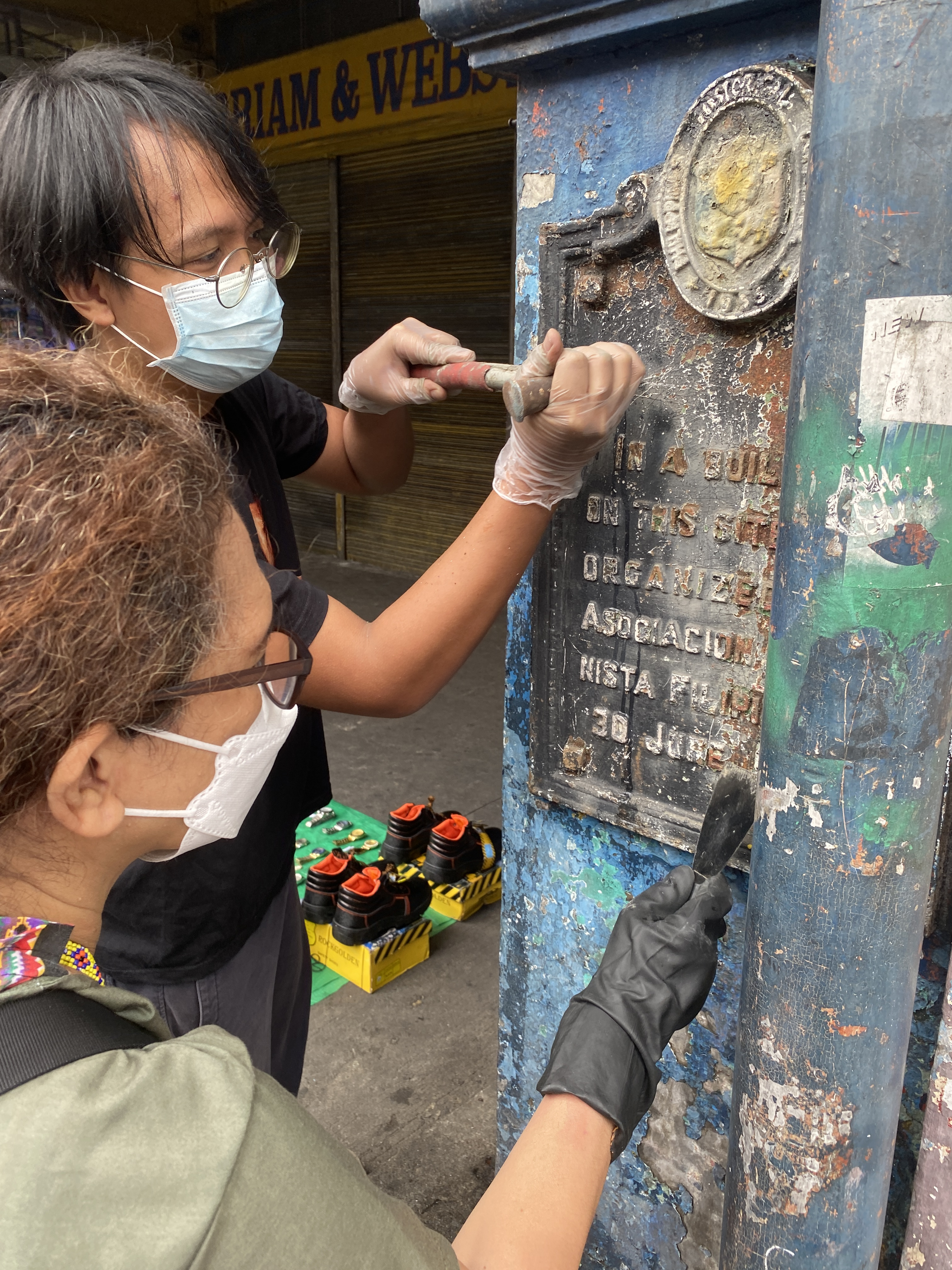
Restoration of a marker

=== Philippines ===
Historical markers (Filipino: panandang pangkasaysayan; Spanish: marcador histórico) are cast-iron plaques installed all over the Philippines that commemorate people, places, personalities, structures, and events. They are installed by the National Historical Commission of the Philippines. This practice started in 1933, with NHCP's predecessor, the Philippine Historical Research and Markers Committee, which initially only marked antiquities in Manila. The initial markers were placed in 1934.

Markers have their texts primarily in Filipino, while there are also markers in the English language, especially for markers that were installed during the American colonial era. Markers in regional languages such as Cebuano, Ilocano, and Kapampangan, are also available and issued by the NHCP. Markers are found all over the country, and there have been markers installed outside the country. The plaques themselves are permanent signs installed in publicly visible locations on buildings, monuments, or in special locations. There are more than 1,690 markers to date. Most markers are located within Luzon, especially in Metro Manila (with more than 500), which has prompted the NHCP to install more markers in Visayas and Mindanao, for their greater inclusion in the national historical narrative.

Issues and controversies have also been the concern of several individual markers, from the commemoration of former Philippine President Ferdinand Marcos to the reaction of the Japanese embassy to the comfort women statue and marker. There have also been some markers replaced by new ones because of rectified information, theft, or loss due to war or disasters. Many American-era markers have been destroyed or were lost as casualties of World War II.

Local municipalities and cities can also install markers of figures and events of local significance. Though they may have the permission of the NHCP, these markers are barred from using the seal of the Republic of the Philippines.

From March to October 2021, quincentennial historical markers were unveiled by the NHCP and the National Quincentennial Committee as part of the 2021 Quincentennial Commemorations in the Philippines (QCP). As part of the 125th anniversary of the Philippine declaration of independence celebrations, the agency then started unveiling Philippine Nationhood Trail historical markers since 2023.

Historical markers of the Philippines

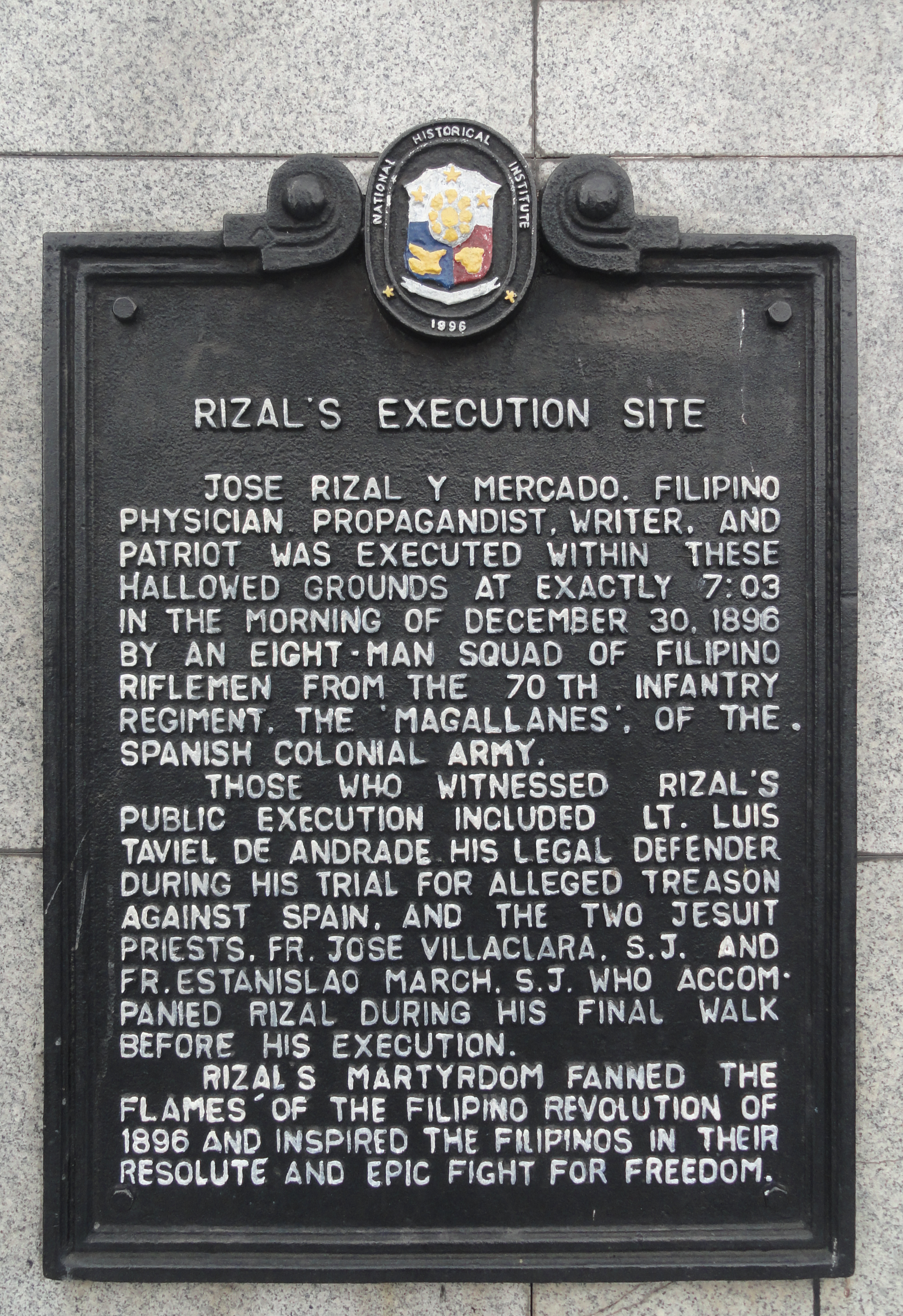

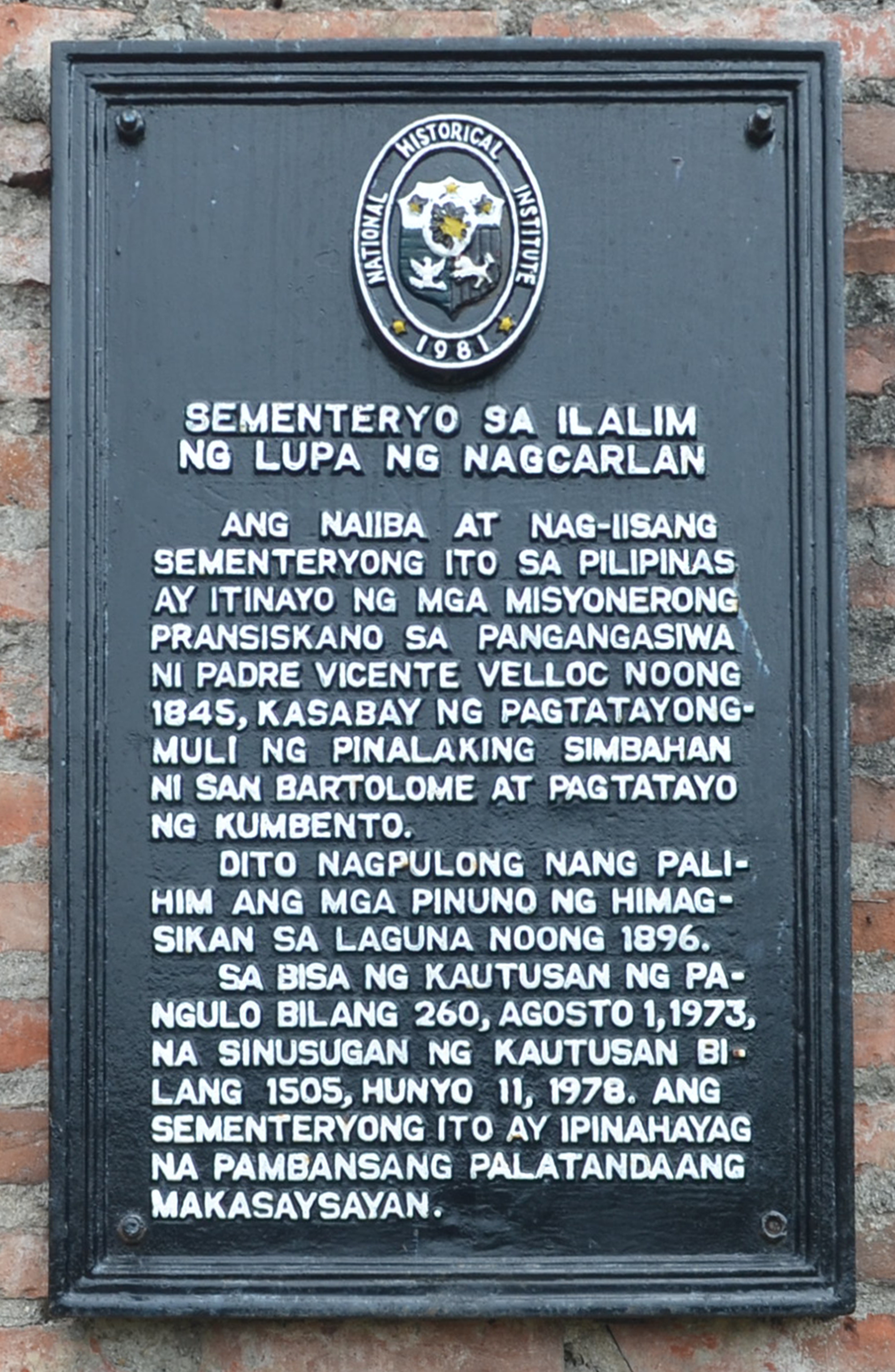

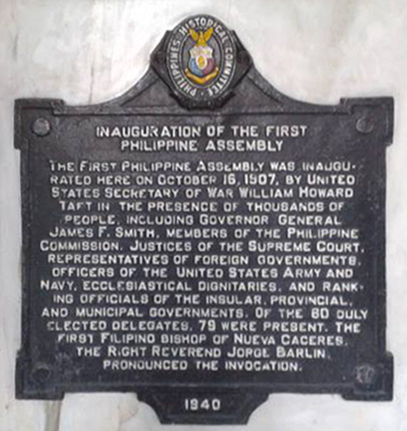

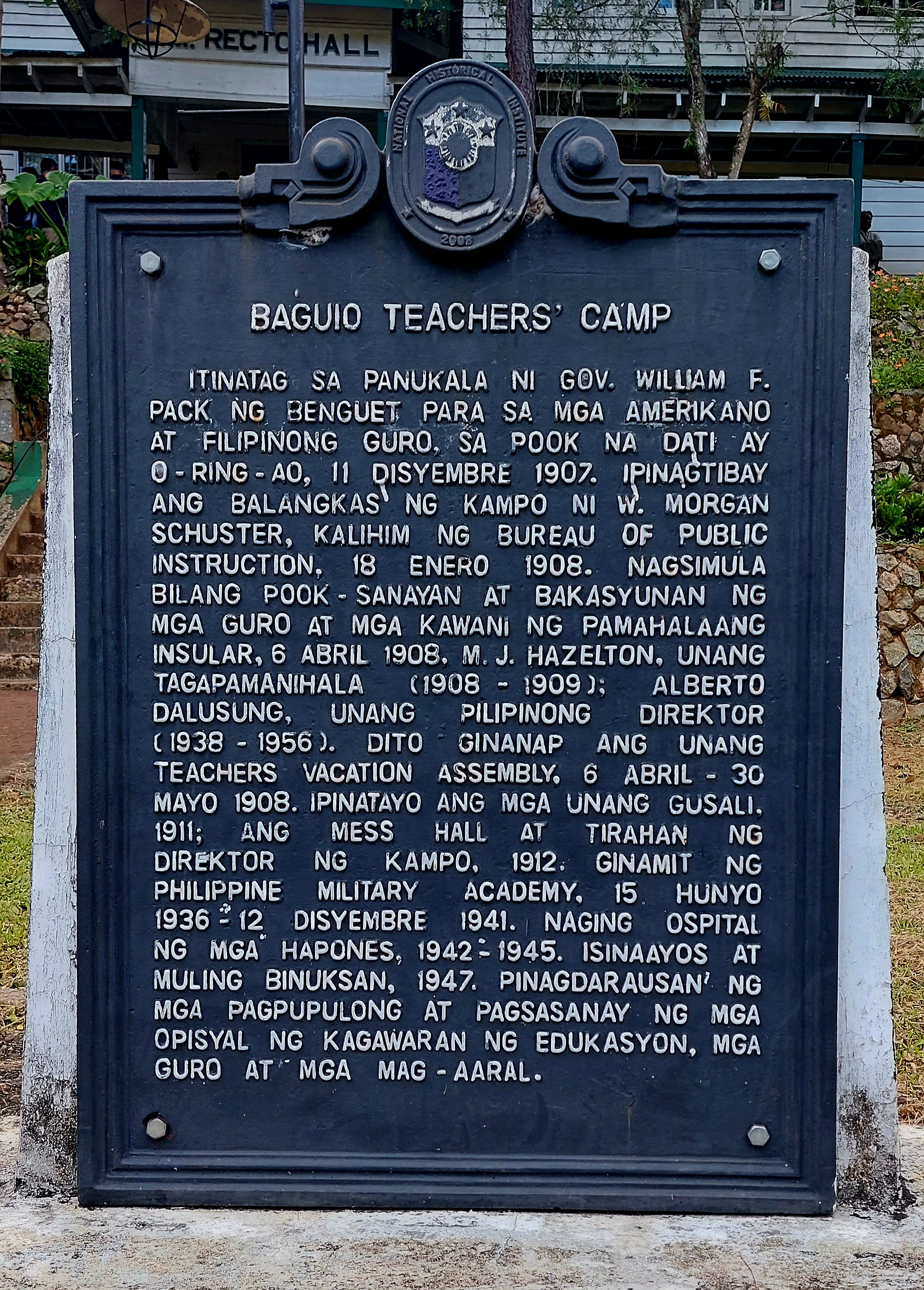

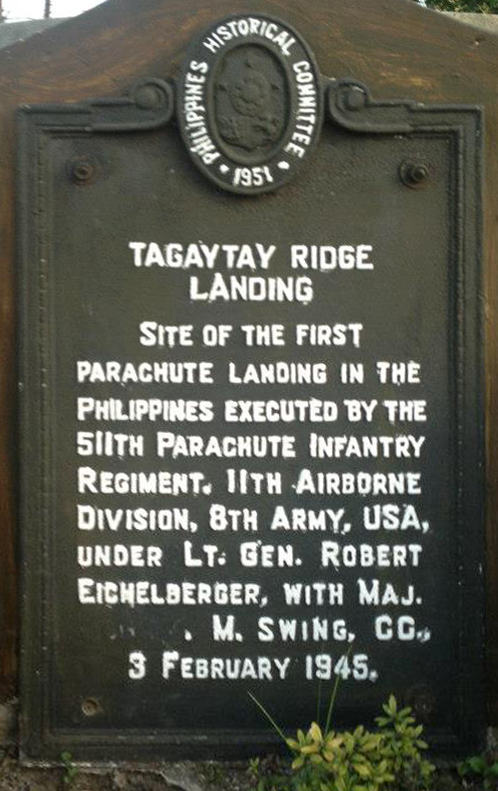

=== Singapore ===
- National Monuments of Singapore

=== Switzerland ===
- Kulturgüterschutz — or: Protection des biens culturels; Cultural heritage protection in Switzerland; or Protezione dei beni culturali

=== United Kingdom ===
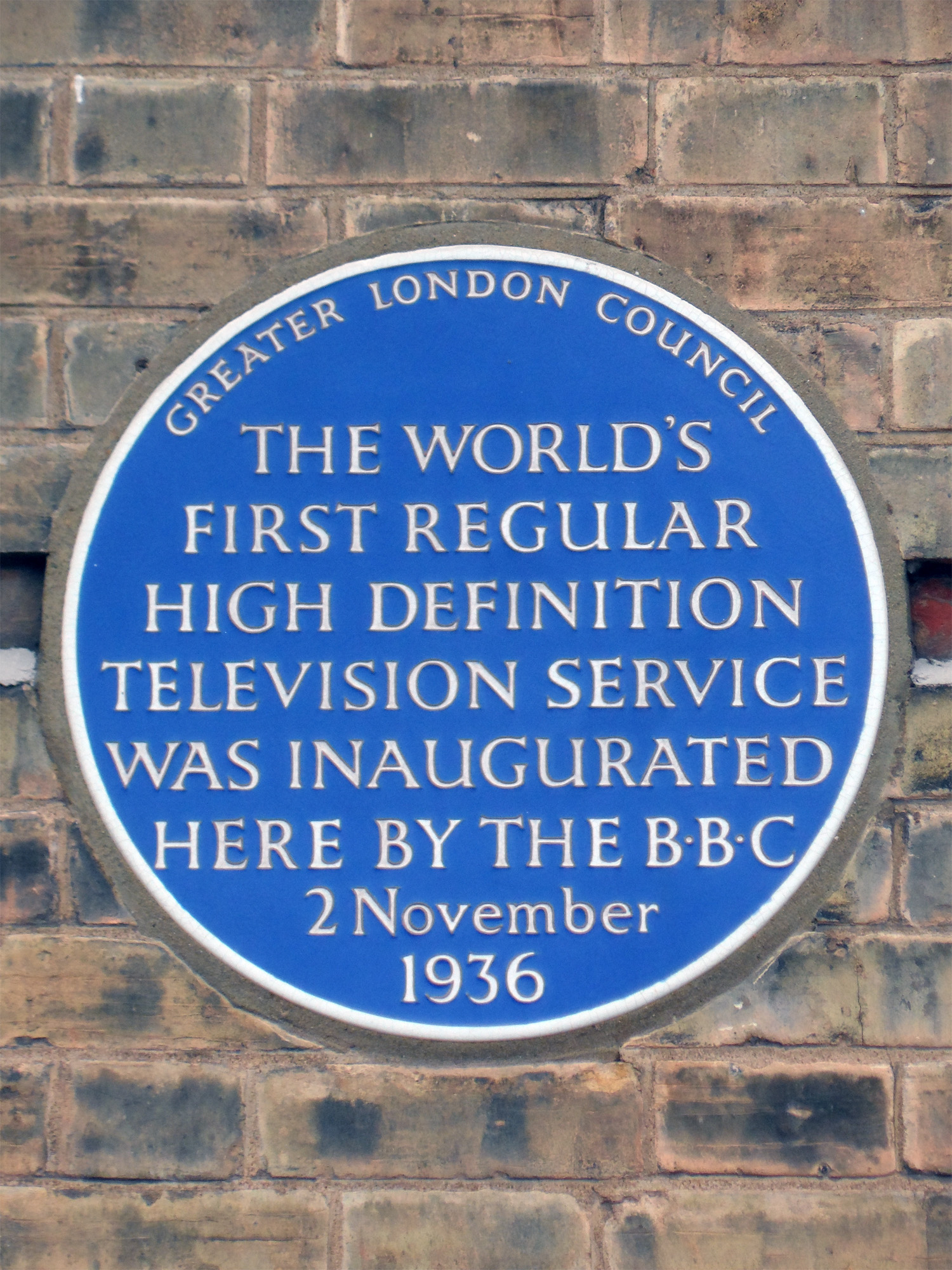
Greater London Council blue plaque at Alexandra Palace commemorating the launch of BBC Television there in 1936

Blue plaques are the principal type of historical markers found throughout England and are the closest thing there is to a historical marker system in the UK. An example is the blue plaque scheme run by English Heritage in London, although these were originally erected in a variety of shapes and colors. This has been running for over 140 years and is thought to be the oldest system of its kind in the world. Plaques are attached to buildings to commemorate their association with important occupants or events. The National Trust (which is a non-profit charity organization unlike English Heritage and English Heritage properties) has its own similar markers as well. The Dead Comics' Society installs blue plaques to commemorate the former residences of well-known comedians, including those of Sid James and John Le Mesurier.

However, not all historical markers in the United Kingdom are blue, and many are not ceramic. A range of other commemorative plaque schemes, which are typically run by local councils and charitable bodies, exists throughout the United Kingdom. These tend to use their own criteria for determining the eligibility to put up a plaque. There are commemorative plaque schemes in Bath, Edinburgh, Brighton, Liverpool, Loughton, and elsewhere—some of which differ from the familiar blue plaque. A scheme in Manchester uses color-coded plaques to commemorate figures, with each of the colors corresponding to the person's occupation. The Purple Plaques/Placiau Porffor scheme in Wales uses purple to commemorate significant women. In 2003, the London Borough of Southwark started a plaque scheme which included living people in the awards. Even in London, the Westminster City Council runs a green plaque scheme which is run alongside that of the blue plaque scheme administered by English Heritage. Other schemes are run by civic societies, district or town councils, or local history groups, and often operate with different criteria.

After the First World War, the families of British and British Empire (now Commonwealth) service men and women killed during the conflict were presented with bronze Memorial Plaques. The plaques, of about 125 millimetres (4.9 in) in diameter, were designed by the eminent sculptor and medallist, Edward Carter Preston.

=== United States ===
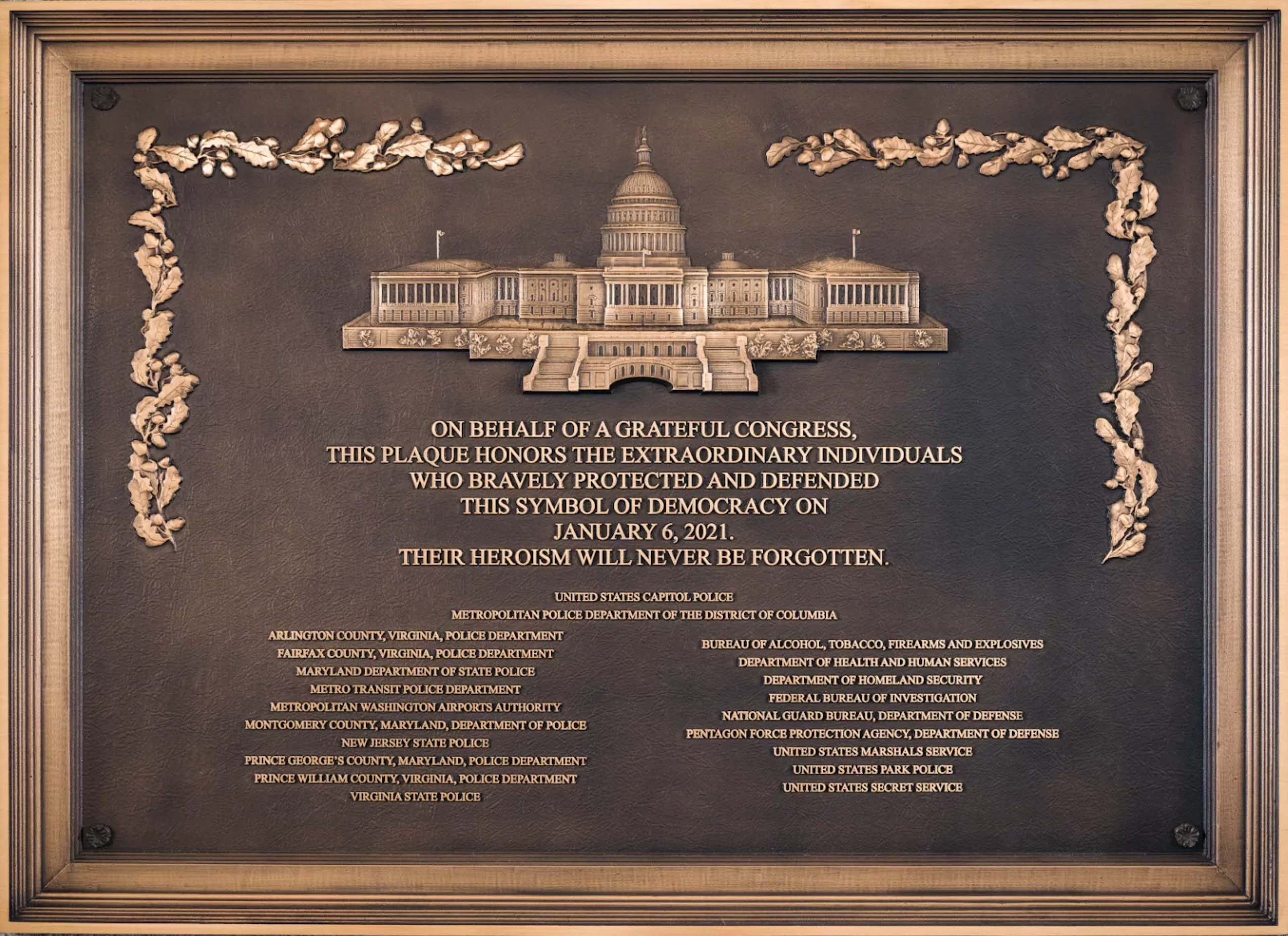
A commemorative plaque honoring those who protected the United States Capitol on January 6, 2021 was placed on a wall inside the building five years later.

In the United States, various state governments have commemorative plaque schemes usually using the name historical markers. The National Trust for Historic Preservation or the U.S. government, through the National Register of Historic Places, can bestow historical status.

State programmes, such as the California Register of Historical Resources, allow designated sites to place their own markers. The criteria and circumstances through which a party administers the distribution of historical markers varies. For example, the "Preservation Worcester" program in Worcester, Massachusetts, allows a person to register their house or other structure of least fifty years of age if the building is well preserved, with retention of its original character and importance to the architectural, cultural or historical nature of the local neighborhood. One then pays a fee ($185 to $225) to receive the historical marker itself.

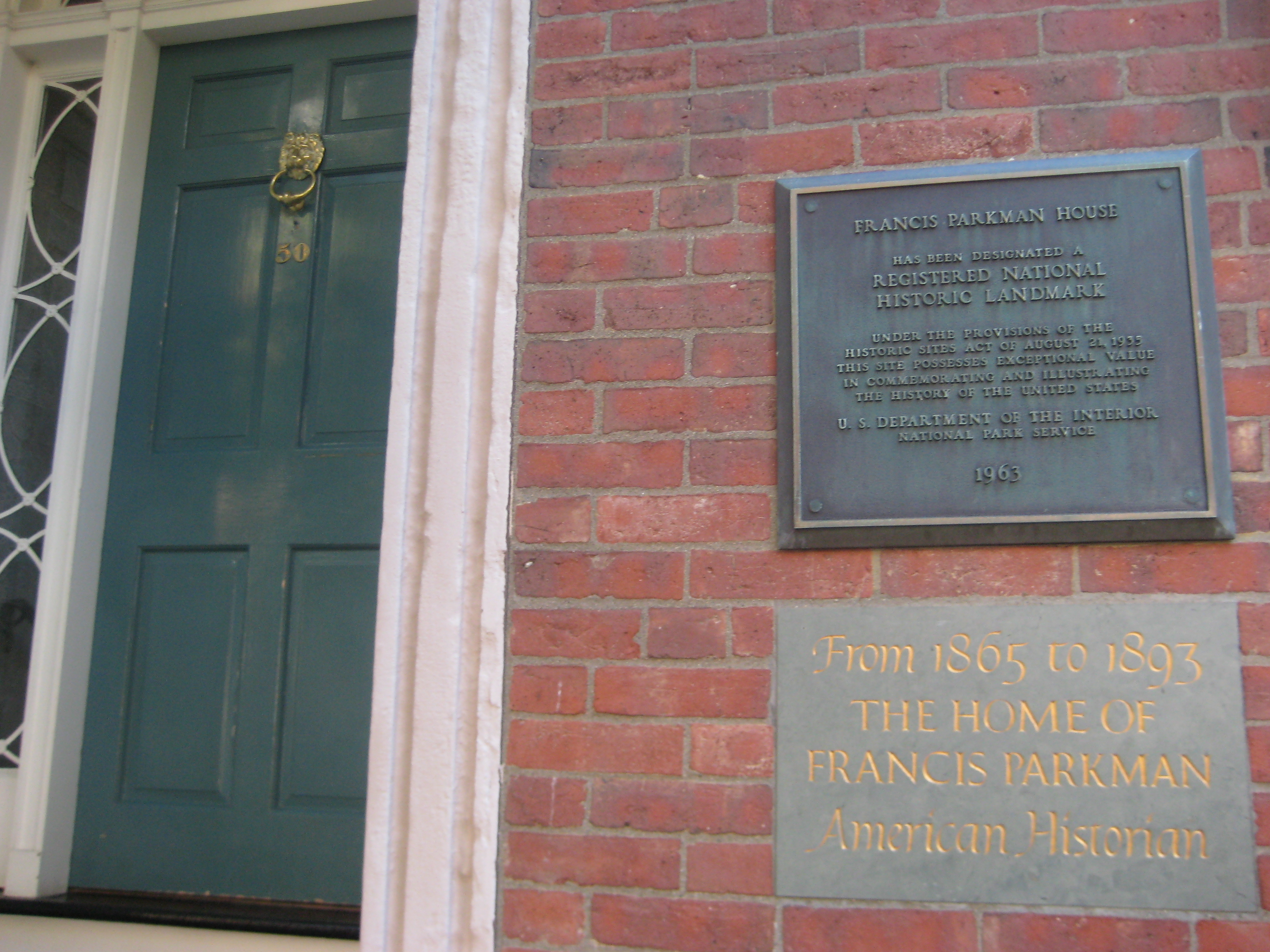
These historical markers indicate the location of Francis Parkman House, a National Historic Landmark on Beacon Hill in Boston, Massachusetts.

In the same state, the Boston neighborhood of Charlestown had its own local association administer historic house markers, of which over 140 were issued before the program was suspended. Other historical markers in and around Boston are administered by agencies such as The Bostonian Society or are associated with sites such as those along the Freedom Trail, the Black Heritage Trail, and the Emerald Necklace.

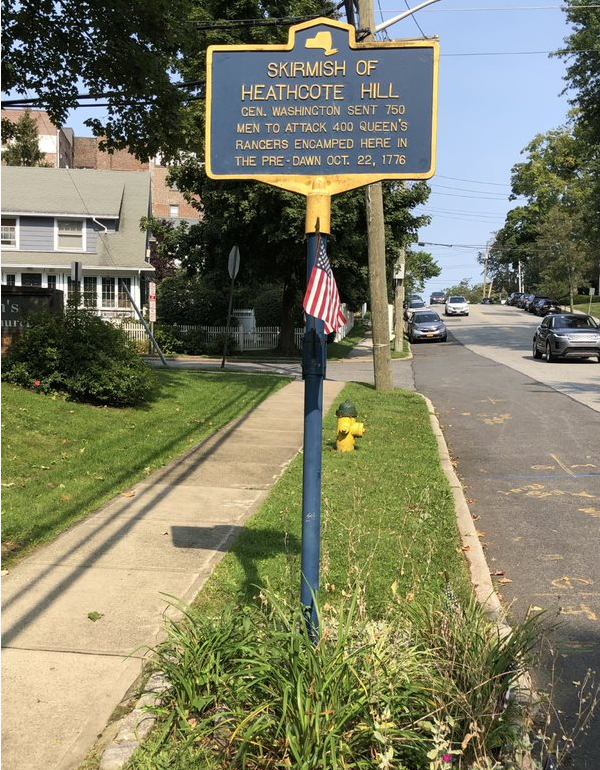
Typical mid-20th century official New York State Historical Marker for a minor battlefield, free standing on a suburban street

Other examples of mostly locally generated historical markers in the United States include:

- Plaque outside the Alaska Governor's Mansion made by the Alaska Centennial Commission's historical markers program,
- Historical markers of State Historic Marker Council in Florida,
- Markers placed by various agencies in Georgia (of which one source mentions 3,292 different historical markers)
- In Indiana, it is illegal to create a historical marker in the "state format" without first getting official approval from that state's historical bureau.
- Historical markers in Kansas erected by the Kansas Historical Society and the Kansas Department of Transportation,
- Roadside Historic Marker Program in Maryland administered by the Maryland Historical Trust,
- State Historic Marker Program of New York (begun in 1926 to commemorate the Sequicentennial of the American Revolution),
- Historic markers placed as recently as 2008 in Sussex County, New Jersey,
- New Mexico historical markers printed in white letters on a brown background by the New Mexico Department of Transportation,
- Historical markers of North Carolina (the Historical Publications Section of the state Office of Archives and History publishes a Guide to North Carolina Highway Historical Markers),
- More than 1200 historical markers of Ohio (all of which are now made in a Marietta, Ohio, workshop),
- Over 550 official state markers in Wisconsin.
- More than 1800 historical markers placed across Michigan since the establishment of the Michigan Historical Marker Program in 1955.

See also:

- Historical markers posted at U.S. state and/or municipal levels (examples):
  - Georgia Historic Markers
  - Indiana State Historic Markers—of statewide historical significance, by state
  - New Hampshire State Historic Markers—of statewide historical significance, by state
  - Nevada Historic Markers—of statewide historical significance, by state
  - New York State Historic Markers—of statewide historical significance, by state
  - North Carolina Highway Historical Marker Program, part of the North Carolina Department of Cultural Resources
  - Pennsylvania State Historic Markers—of statewide historical significance, by state
  - Texas Historic Markers

== Awards ==
Plaques or, more often, plaquettes, are also given as awards instead of trophies or ribbons. Such plaques usually bear text describing the reason for the award and, often, the date of the award.

== See also ==
- Blue plaque
- Hartog Plate
- Historical Marker Database
- Historical markers of the Philippines
  - Quincentennial historical markers in the Philippines
  - Philippine Nationhood Trail historical markers
- List of blue plaques
- National Trust for Places of Historic Interest or Natural Beauty – England, Wales, and Northern Ireland
- National Trust for Scotland
- Parting stone
- Statutory List of Buildings of Special Architectural or Historic Interest
- Stolperstein

== General and cited references ==
- English Heritage, Blue Plaques: A Guide to the Scheme, 2002
- James Loewen, Lies Across America: What Our Historic Sites Get Wrong, 1999.
- Nick Rennison, The London Blue Plaque Guide, 2003
- Derek Sumeray, Discovering London Plaques, 1999
- Derek Sumeray, Track the Plaque, 2003
