= Sideco House =

Historic house in Nueva Ecija, Philippines

- Bahay Sideco
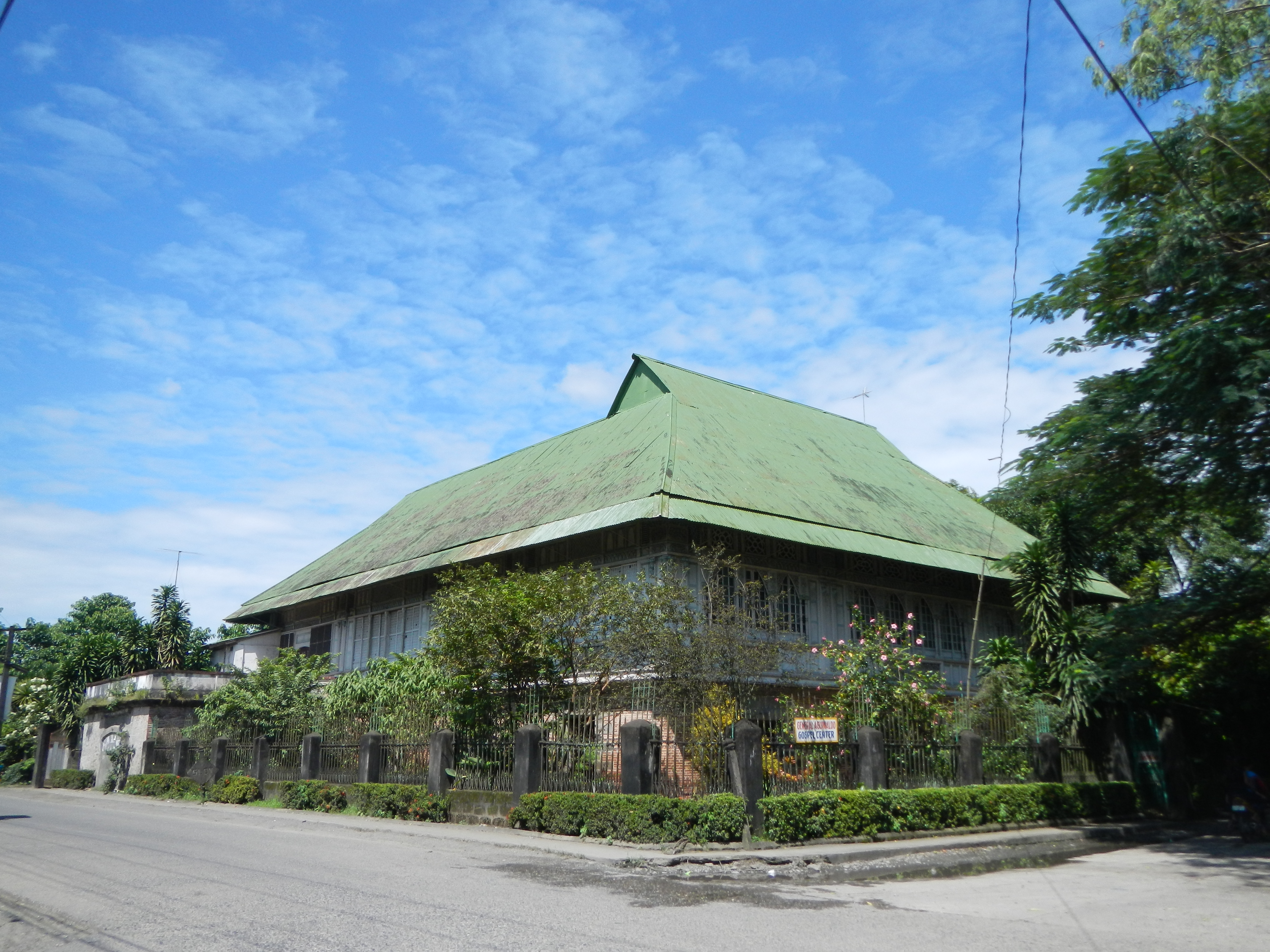
- The house viewed from the southwest

- Location within Nueva Ecija Sideco House (Luzon) Sideco House (Philippines)
- Alternative names: Crispulo Sideco House

General information
- Status: Completed
- Architectural style: Bahay na Bato
- Location: Vallarta cor. P. Carmen Sts., Poblacion, San Isidro, Nueva Ecija, Philippines
- Coordinates: 15°18′41.4″N 120°54′15.1″E
- Elevation: 24 metres (79 feet)

Technical details
- Floor count: 2

The Sideco House, also called the Crispulo Sideco House (Filipino: Bahay Crispulo Sideco), is a historic house located in San Isidro, Nueva Ecija, Philippines, close to the Pampanga River. It was once the headquarters of the First Philippine Republic in 1899.

== Background ==
The municipality of San Isidro was proclaimed as the capital of the Philippines on March 29, 1899, by General Emilio Aguinaldo, the recognized first president of the Philippines. During his stay in San Isidro, this house owned by Captain Crispulo "Pulong" Sideco served as the de facto residence and office of Aguinaldo as president.

The house ceased to be the presidential seat when San Isidro fell to the Americans on May 17, 1899. This caused Aguinaldo to move the government seat to Angeles, Pampanga. The March 1901 capture of Aguinaldo, which ended the First Philippine Republic, was planned in this house by American General Frederick Funston.

In 2024, the house serves as the background for the Landas ng Pagkabansang Pilipino marker for San Isidro, Nueva Ecija.

== Images ==
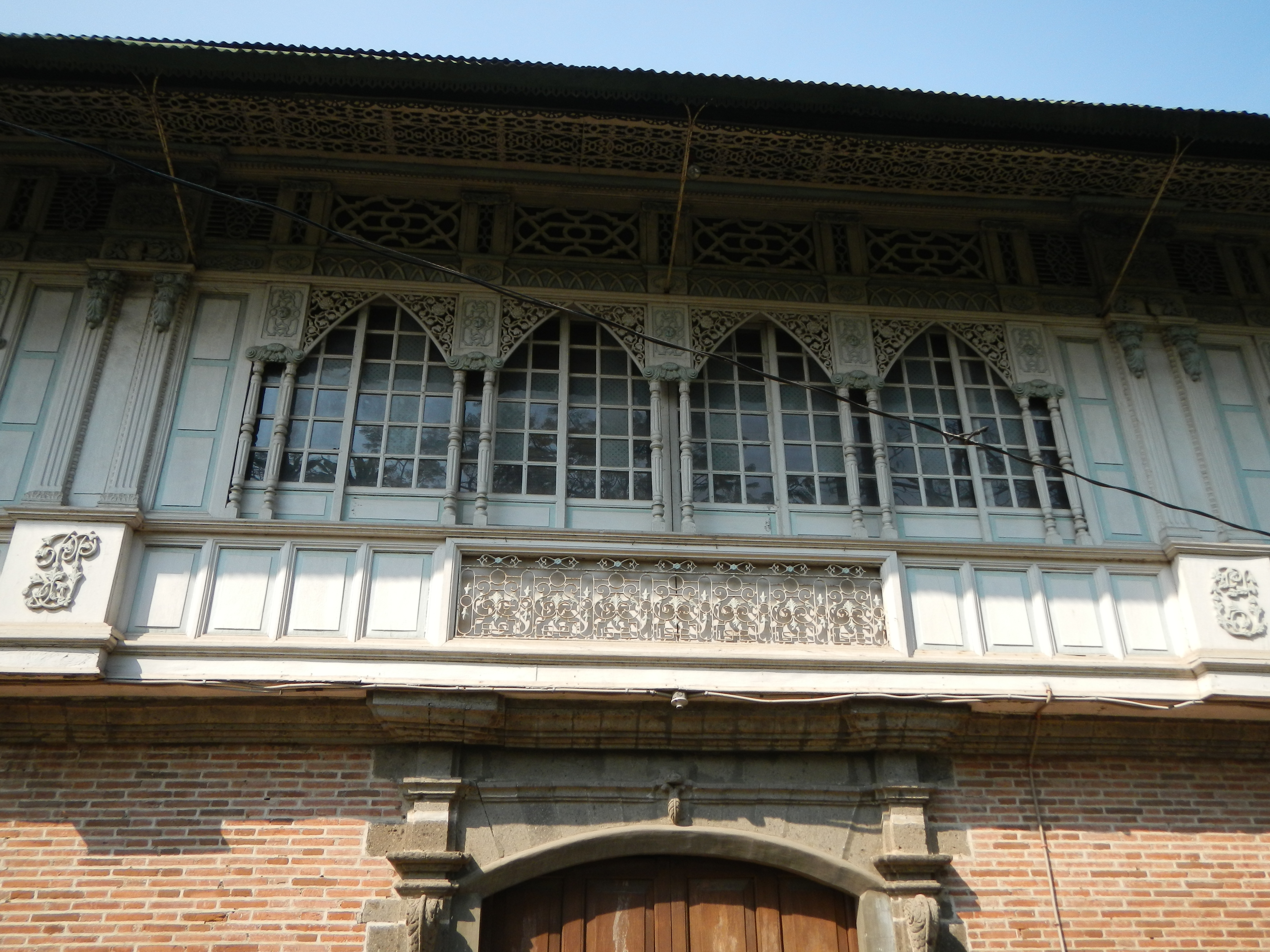

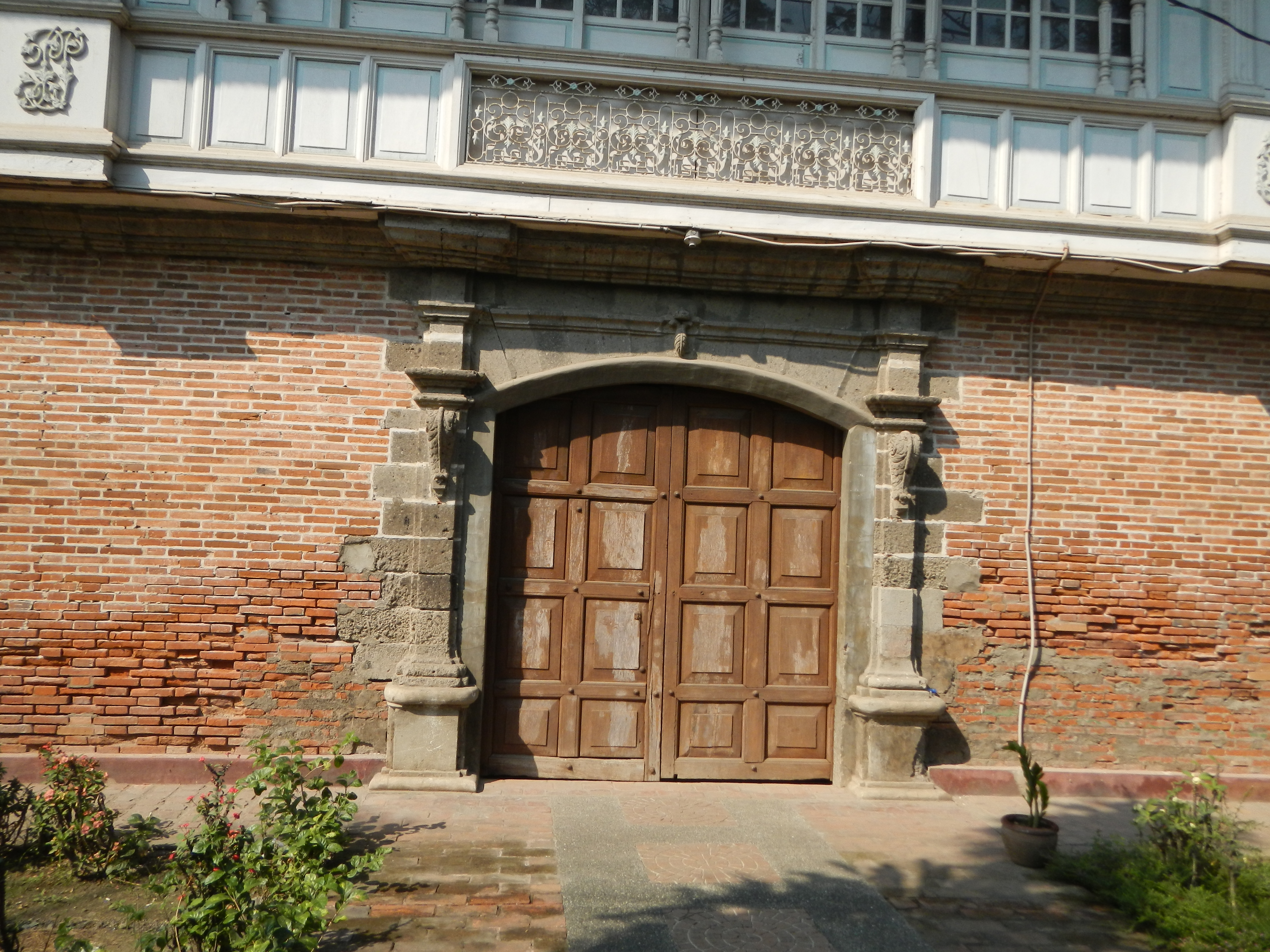

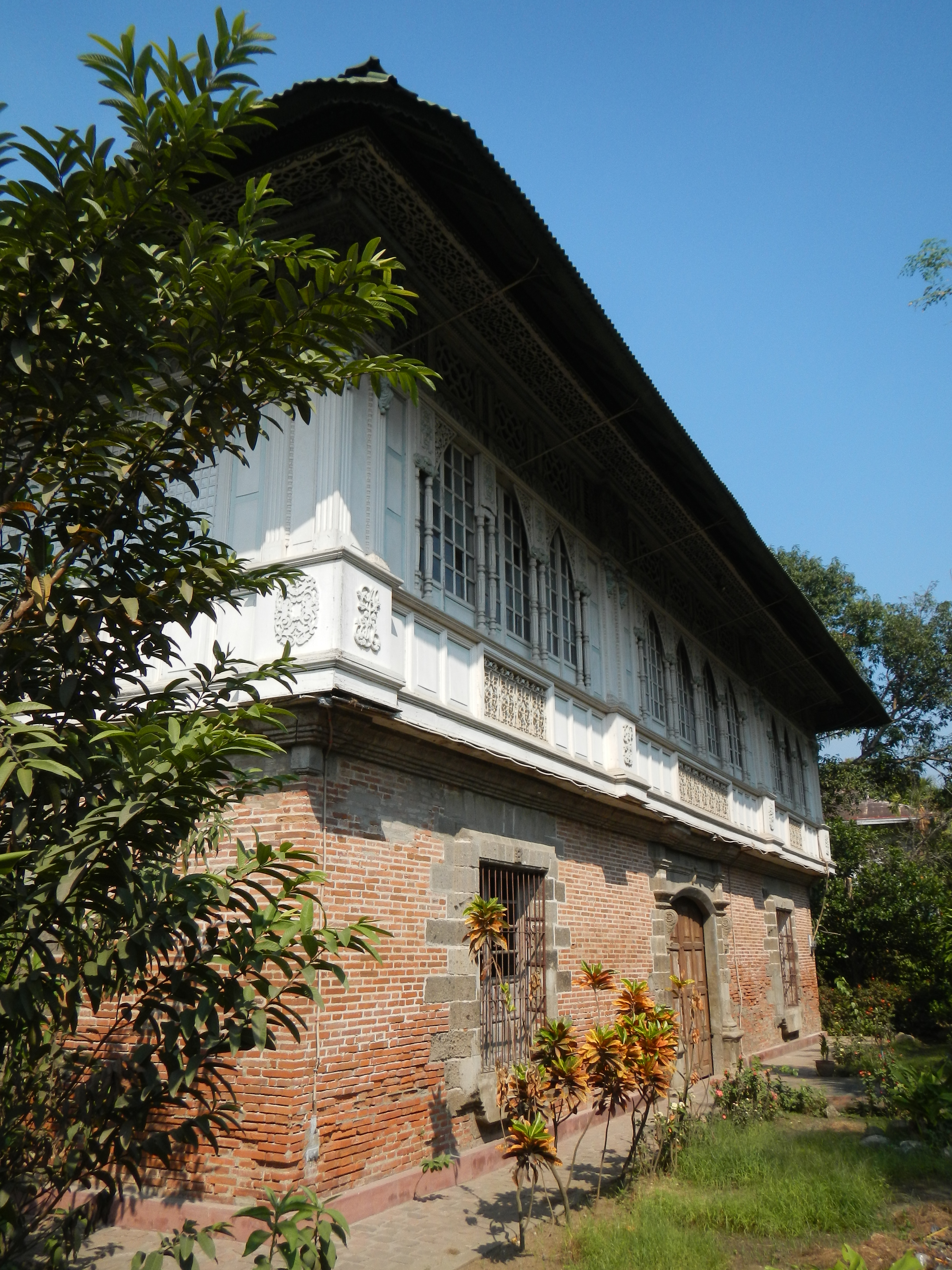

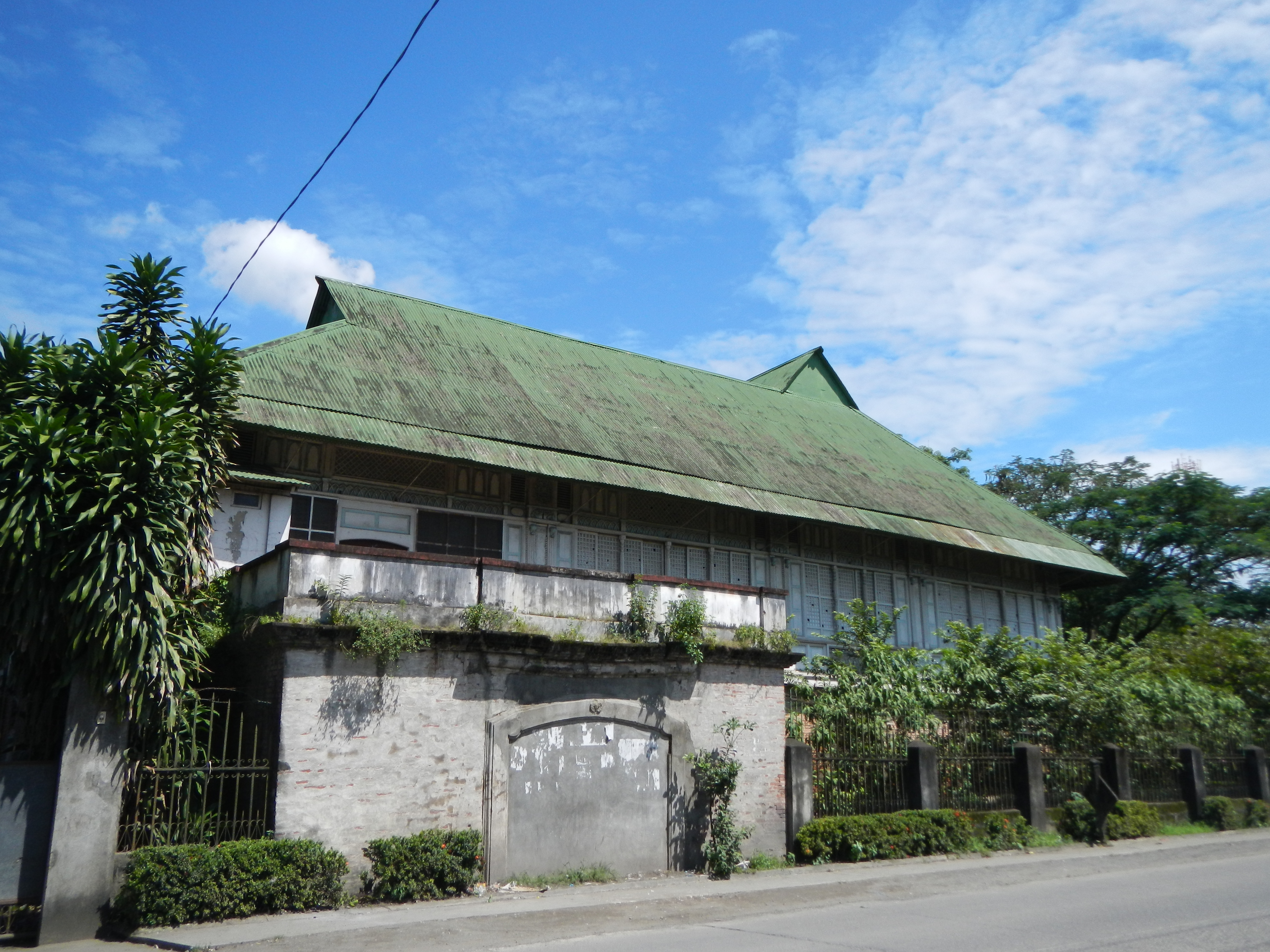

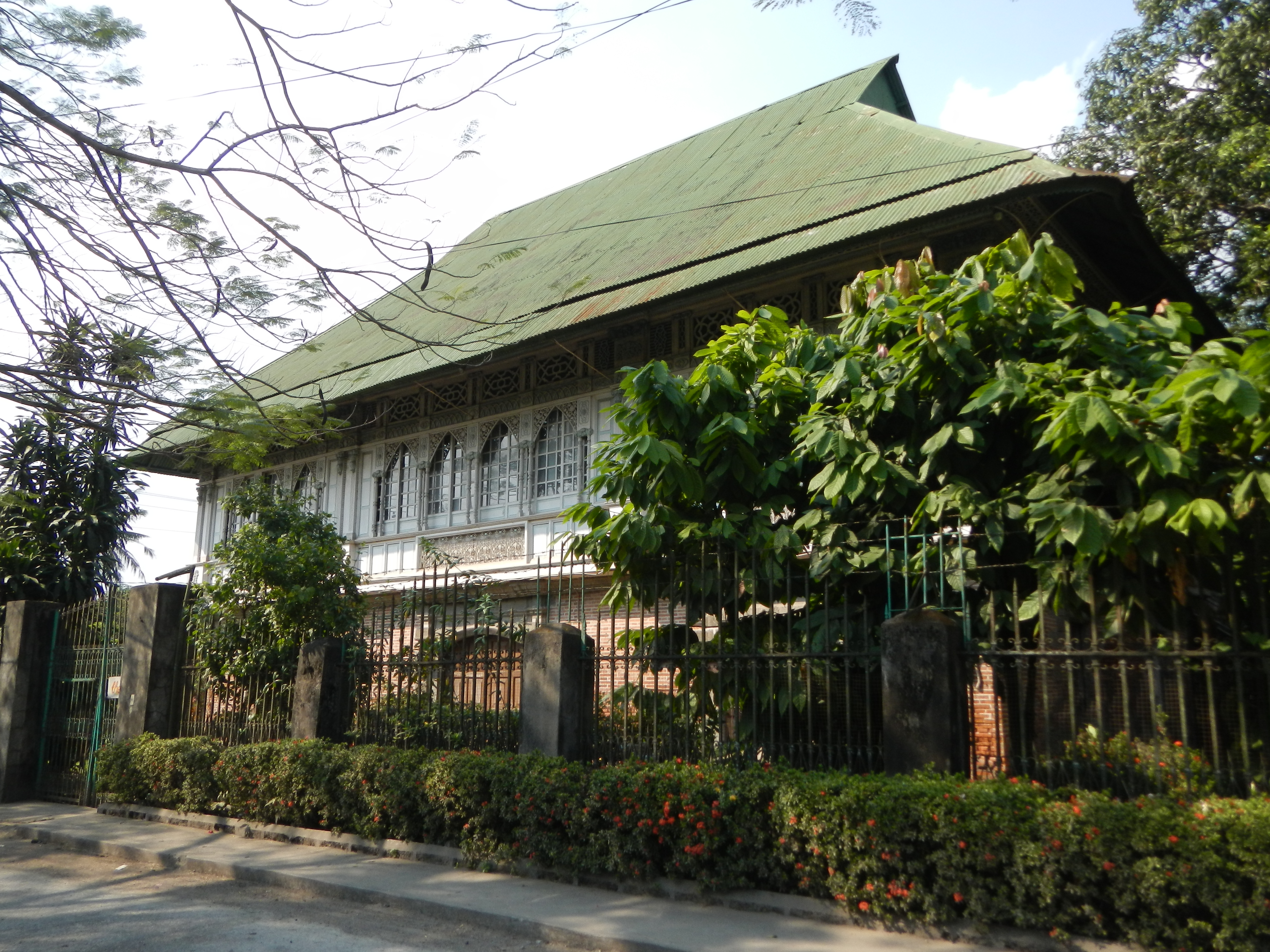

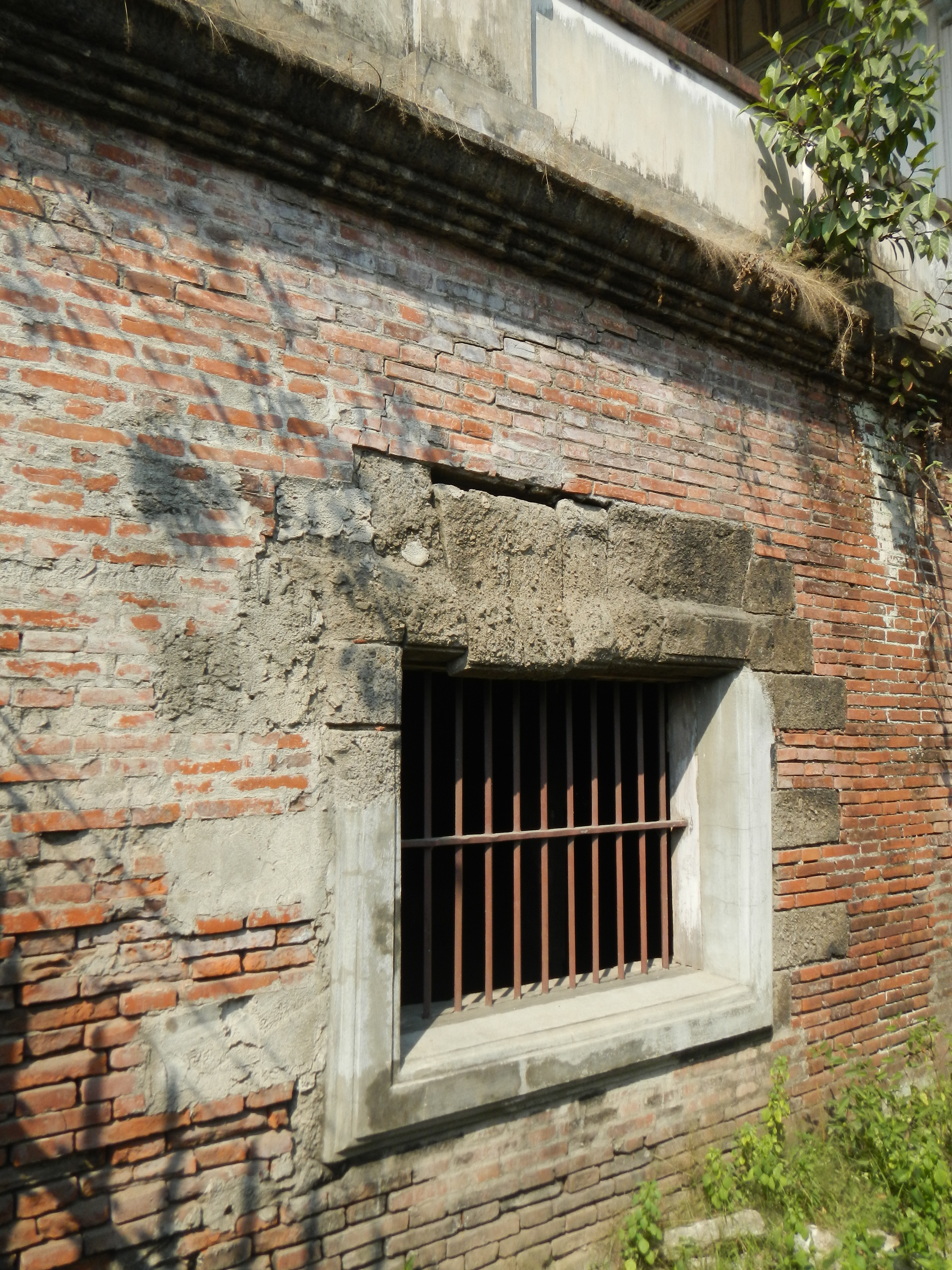

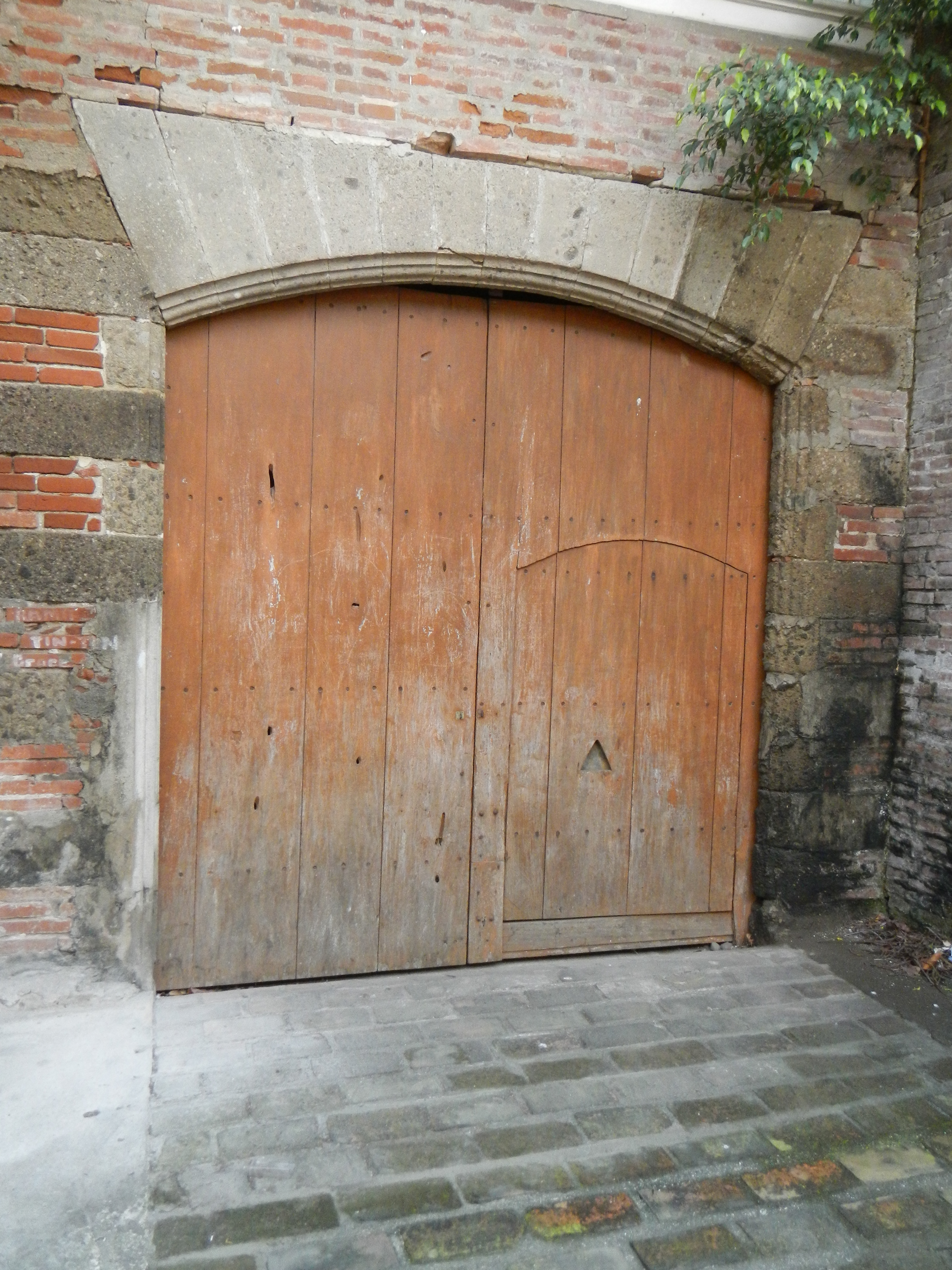

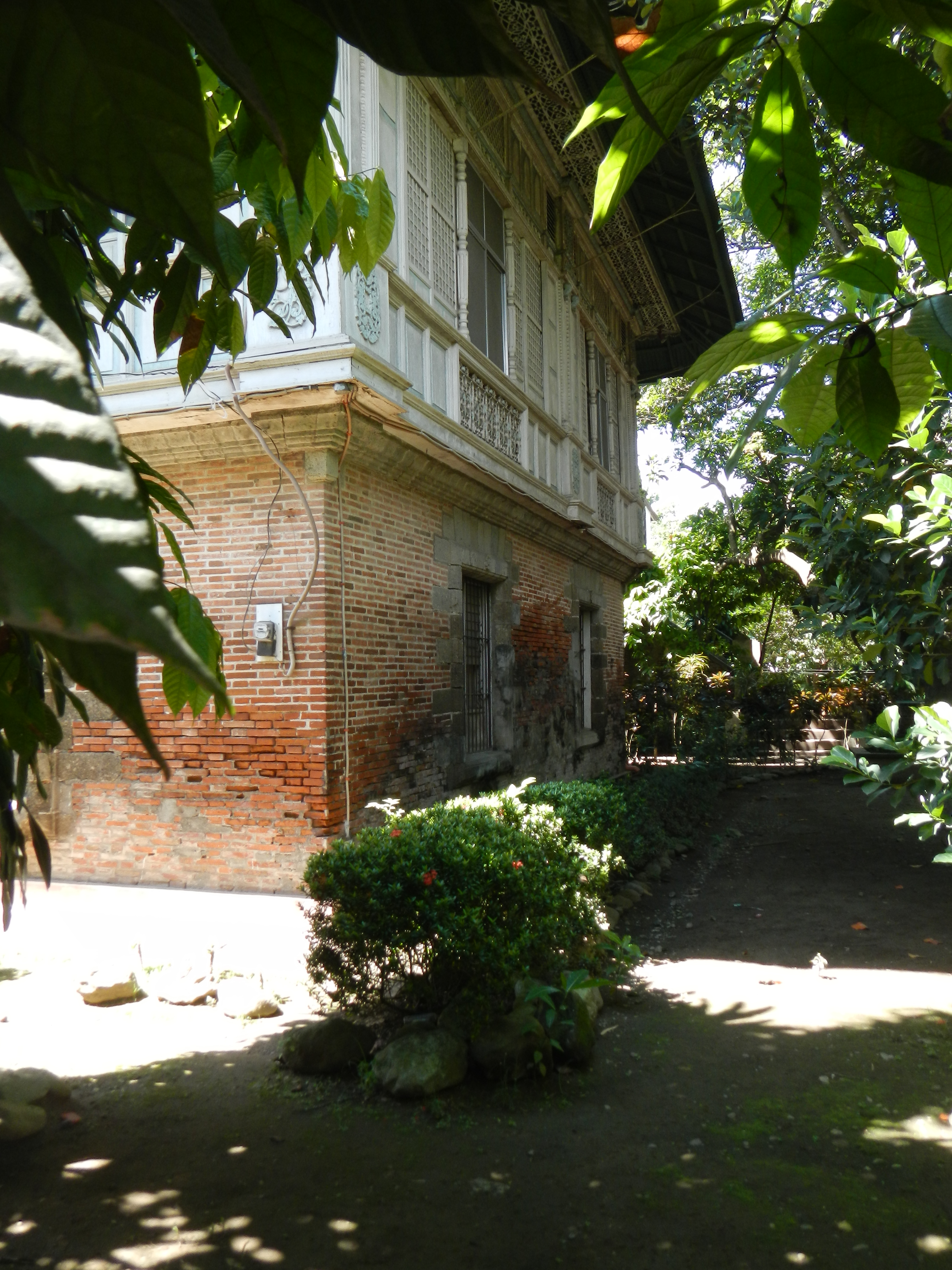

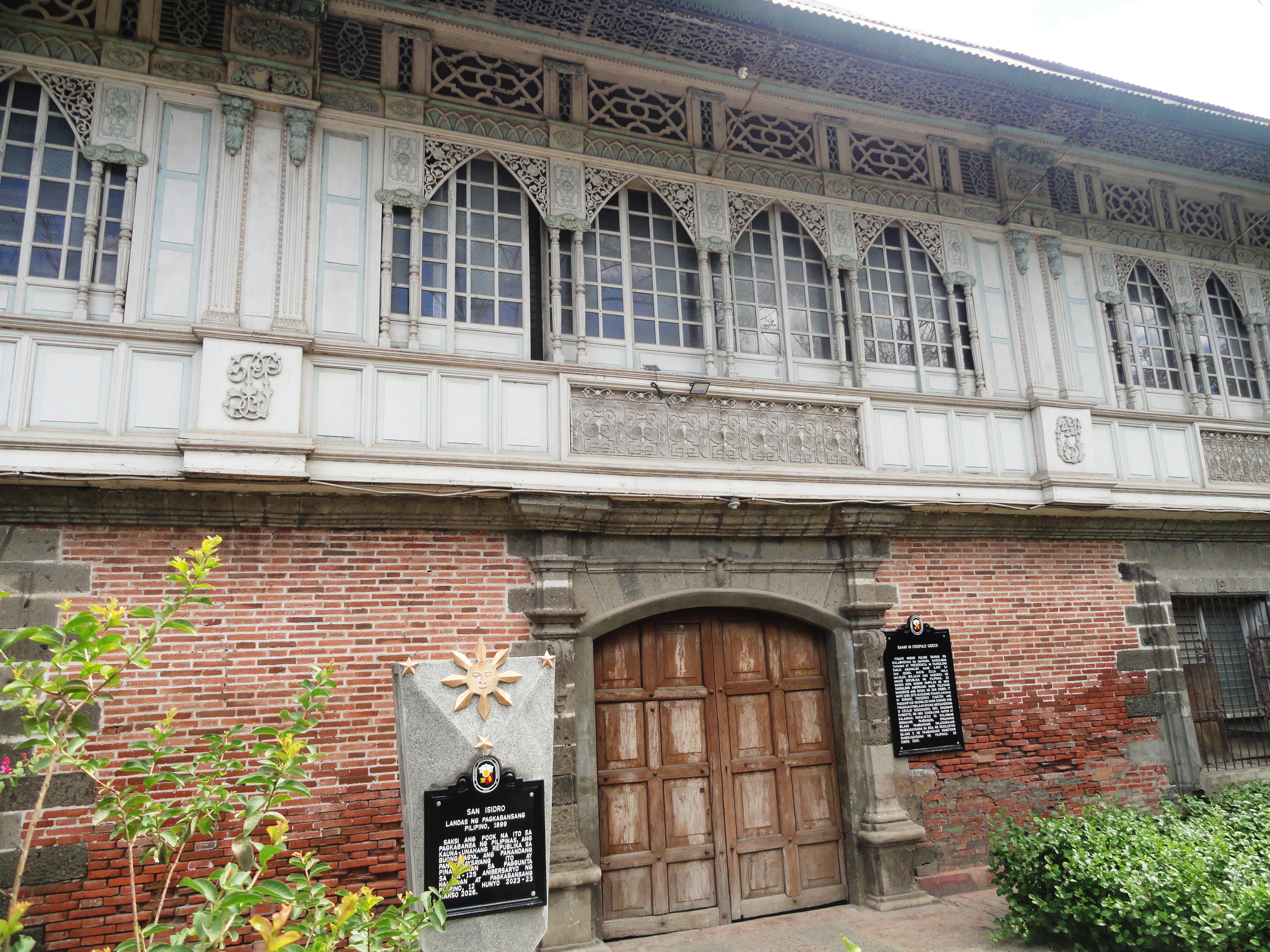
House with the two NHCP markers.

== See also ==
- Malacañang Palace
- Aguinaldo Shrine
