= List of Philippine Nationhood Trail historical markers =

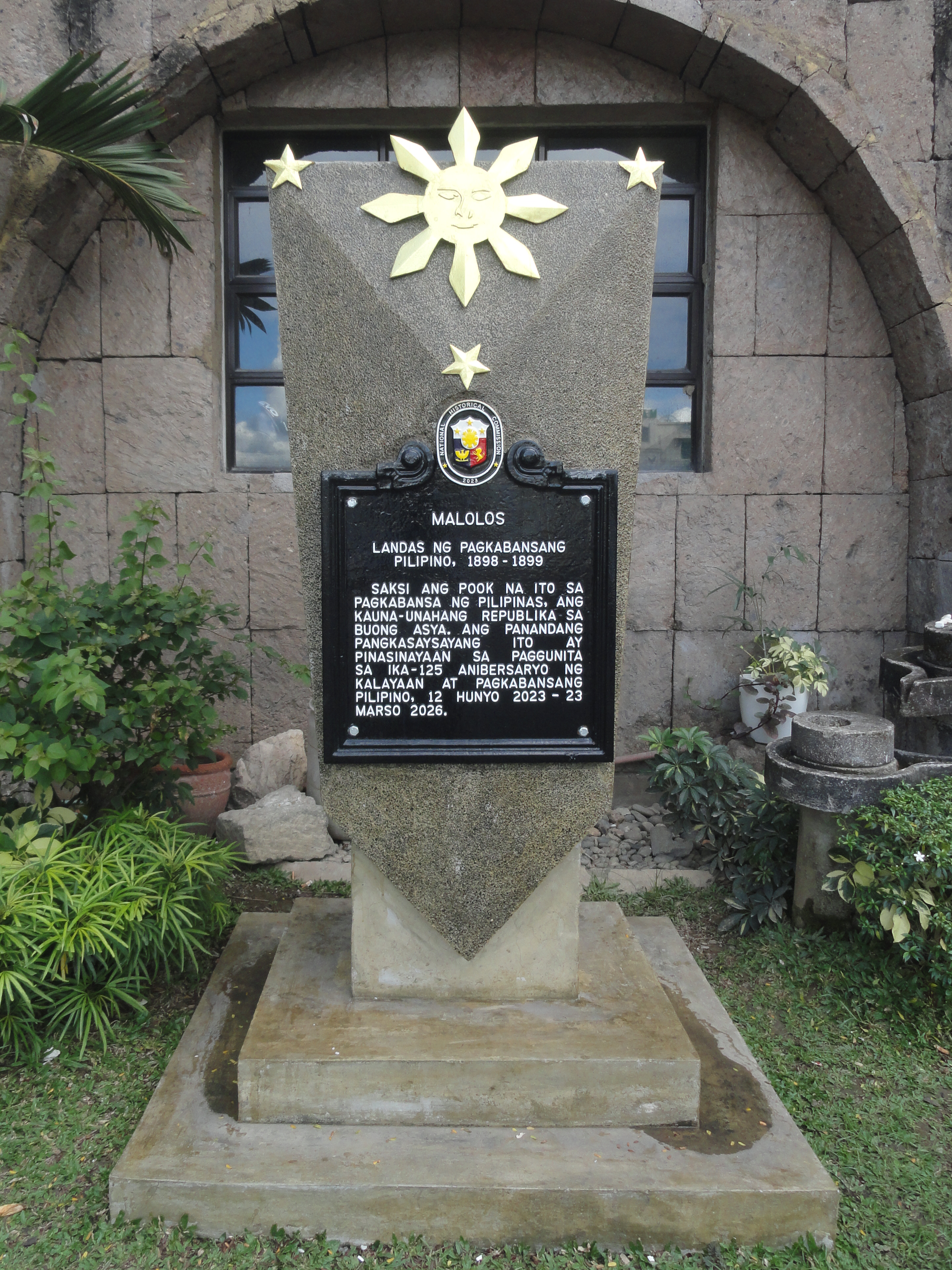
Obverse side of the Malolos marker and pedestal

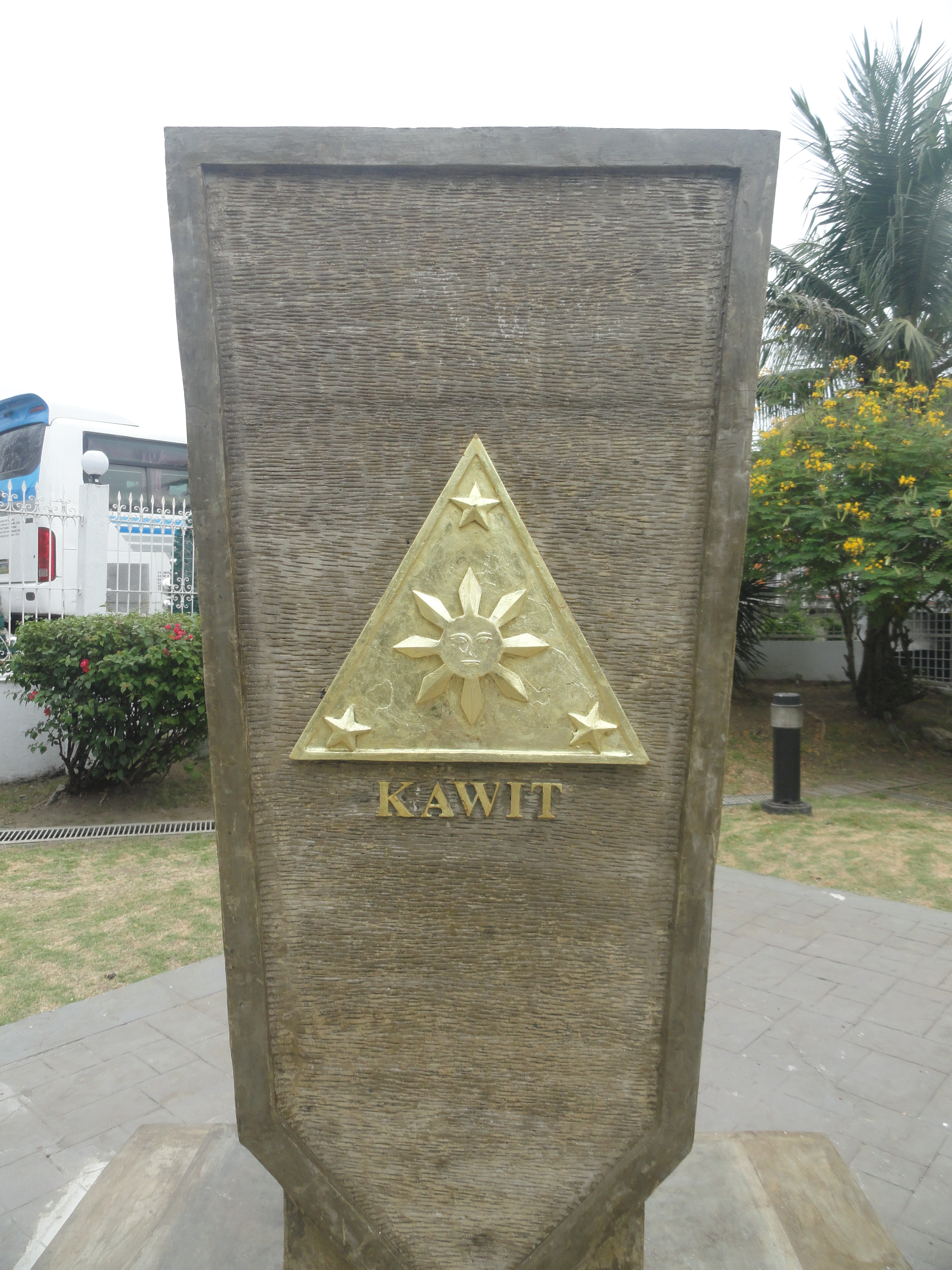
Reverse side of the Kawit pedestal

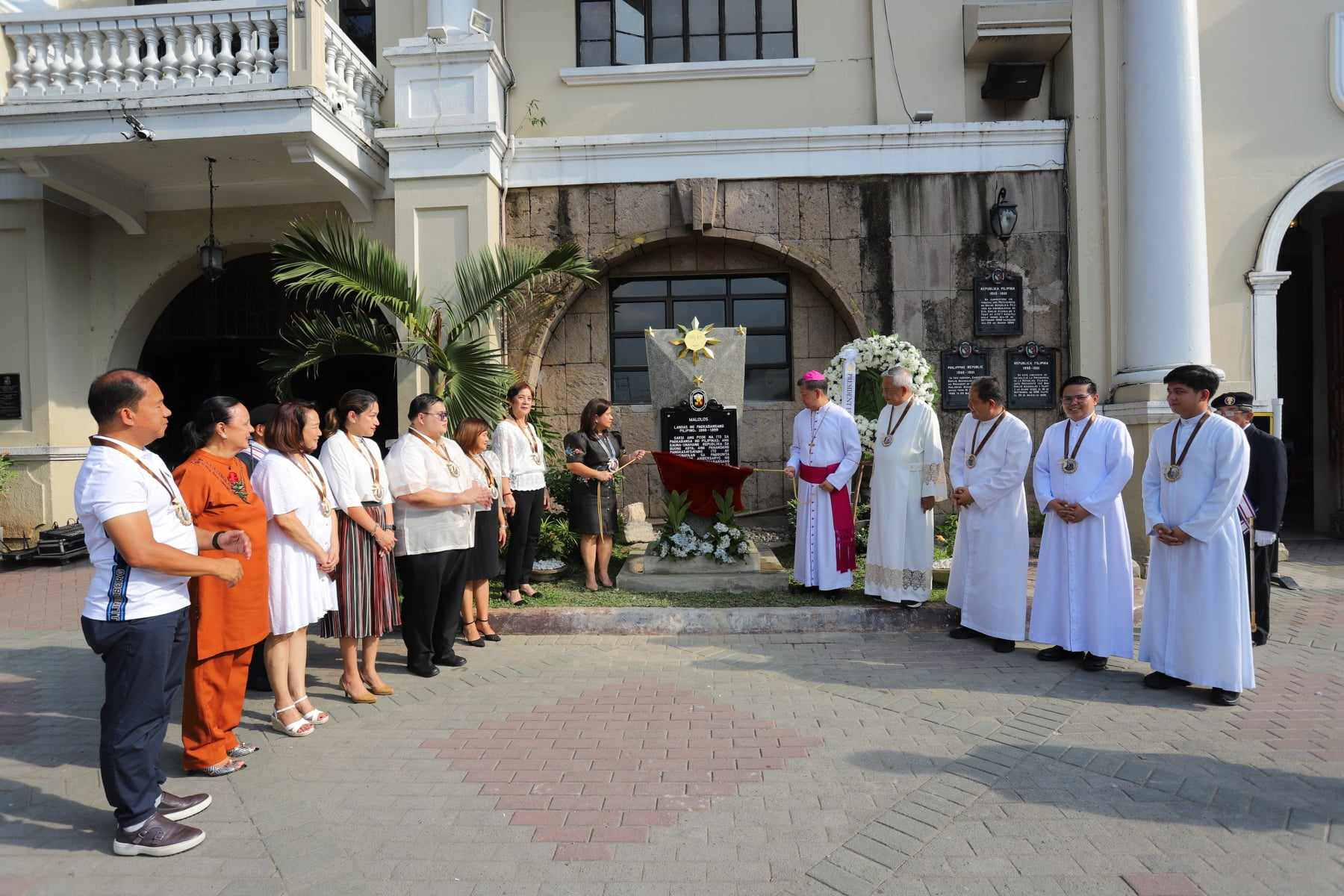
Unveiling of the Malolos marker, September 10, 2023

The following is a list of historical markers unveiled by the National Historical Commission of the Philippines (NHCP) as part of the Philippine Nationhood Trail to commemorate the 125th anniversary of the Philippine declaration of independence in 1898 including the subsequent struggles of the First Philippine Republic during the Philippine–American War leading to General Emilio Aguinaldo's capture in 1901.

== Background ==
Inspired by the NHCP's project in 2021 for the Quincentennial Commemorations where 34 quincentennial historical markers were unveiled at sites all over the Philippines that the Magellan expedition visited, the commission launched the Landas ng Pagkabansang Pilipino (Filipino for "Philippine Nationhood Trail") where 100 sites in the country will be given a standard memorial and historical marker. The NHCP held a program at Fort San Pedro in Cebu City on August 3, 2022, where they announced the project and unveiled the logo with the theme of "Kalayaan. Kinabukasan. Kasaysayan." (Freedom. Future. History.). During a forum held in December 2023, the NHCP stated that 43 markers would be unveiled in 2024, with a total of 74 up to 2026.

The first marker was unveiled in Bacoor, Cavite on August 1, 2023, and the second at the Aguinaldo Shrine in nearby Kawit on August 31, 2023 (originally announced to be unveiled on June 23).

== List ==
Order	Marker title	Category	Location	Commemorated event and date	Date when marker was unveiled	Marker photo
1	Kawit	Capitals	Aguinaldo Shrine, Kawit, Cavite	Philippine Declaration of Independence (June 12, 1898)	August 31, 2023	
2	Bacoor	Capitals	Cuenca Ancestral House, Gen. Evangelista Street, Bacoor, Cavite	Bacoor Assembly (August 1, 1898)	August 1, 2023	
3	Malolos	Capitals	Malolos Cathedral, Malolos, Bulacan	Arrival of Emilio Aguinaldo in Malolos (September 10, 1898)	September 10, 2023	
4	San Fernando	Journey	Gen. Hizon Extension, San Fernando, Pampanga	Aguinaldo retreated from Malolos to San Isidro (March 28-29, 1899)	April 1, 2024	
5	Arayat	Journey	Arayat Municipal Plaza, Arayat, Pampanga	Aguinaldo's forces stayed here on their way to San Isidro, Nueva Ecija (March 29, 1899)	April 11, 2024	
6	San Isidro	Capitals	Sideco House, Vallarta Street, San Isidro, Nueva Ecija	Críspulo Sideco's house used as presidencia by Aguinaldo (March 29, 1899)	April 5, 2024	
7	Cabanatuan	Capitals	Cabanatuan Cathedral, Cabanatuan City	Church used as seat of the Republic before moving to Bamban (June 1899)	June 14, 2024	
8	Bamban	Capitals	Bamban Municipal Library, Bamban, Tarlac	Bamban became temporary capital of the Republic (June 6, 1899)	July 4, 2024	
9	Angeles	Journey	Pamintuan Mansion, Angeles City	Aguinaldo celebrated the 1st anniversary of the Philippine Declaration of Independence in Angeles (June 12, 1899)	February 6, 2025	
10	Tarlac	Capitals	Tarlac State University, Tarlac, Tarlac	Casa Real in Tarlac became the seat of the Philippine Republic (June 21, 1899)	June 21, 2024	
11	Bayambang	Journey	Bayambang Municipal Hall, Bayambang, Pangasinan	Bayambang as seat of the Republic, where Aguinaldo decided to fight the Americans using guerrilla tactics. (November 12–13, 1899)	November 13, 2024	
12	Santa Barbara	Journey	Santa Barbara Town Plaza, Santa Barbara, Pangasinan	Aguinaldo merged his troops with those of Lt. Joven and Gen. del Pilar. (November 14, 1899)	October 30, 2024	
13	Manaoag	Journey	Manaoag Municipal Hall, Manaoag, Pangasinan	Aguinaldo stayed in the forests of Manaoag. (November 14, 1899)	November 13, 2024	
14	Calasiao	Journey	Calasiao Municipal Hall, Calasiao, Pangasinan	Aguinaldo stayed at the Church and Town Plaza of Calasiao. (November 14, 1899)	November 14, 2024	
15	San Manuel	Journey	Doña Carmen's Park, San Manuel, San Manuel, Pangasinan	Aguinaldo passed through this town. (November 14, 1899)	November 14, 2024	
16	Pozzorubio	Journey	Pozzorubio Town Plaza, Pozzorubio, Pangasinan	Aguinaldo temporary rested in the town church. (November 14, 1899)	November 26, 2024	
17	Alava	Journey	Sison, Pangasinan	Aguinaldo passed through this town. (November 15, 1899)	January 31, 2025	
18	Rosario	Journey	Rosario, La Union	Aguinaldo passed through this town. General Manuel Tinio reported the arrival of American troops. (November 16, 1899)	January 31, 2025	
19	Tubao	Journey	Tubao Municipal Plaza, Tubao, La Union	Aguinaldo passed through this town. (November 16-17, 1899)	March 18, 2025	
20	Aringay	Journey	Don Agaton Yaranon Memorial Park, Aringay, La Union	Aguinaldo encouraged Ilocanos to continue fighting. (November 17, 1899)	November 25, 2024	
21	Caba	Journey	Caba Town Plaza, Caba, La Union	Aguinaldo stayed in this town. (November 17, 1899)	November 25, 2024	
22	Bauang	Journey	Bauang, La Union	Aguinaldo stayed in this town. (November 17, 1899)	March 19, 2025	
23	San Fernando	Journey	San Fernando City Plaza, La Union	Aguinaldo passed through this town. (November 19, 1899)	December 2, 2024	
24	Bacnotan	Journey	Bacnotan Town Plaza, La Union	Aguinaldo passed through this town. (November 19, 1899)	October 15, 2025	
25	Balaoan	Journey	Balaoan, La Union	Aguinaldo stayed in this town. (November 19-21, 1899)	January 30, 2025	
26	Bangar	Journey	Bangar Public Plaza, La Union	Aguinaldo stayed in this town. (November 21, 1899)	October 15, 2025	
27	Sevilla	Journey	Covered court, Sevilla, Santa Cruz, Ilocos Sur	Aguinaldo passed through this barrio. (November 21, 1899)	November 26, 2024	
28	Santa Cruz	Journey	People's Park, Santa Cruz, Ilocos Sur	Aguinaldo passed through this town. (November 21, 1899)	November 26, 2024	
29	Santa Lucia	Journey	Santa Lucia, Ilocos Sur	Aguinaldo passed through this town. (November 21, 1899)	December 9, 2025	
30	Salcedo	Journey	Salcedo Plaza, Salcedo, Ilocos Sur	Aguinaldo passed through this town. (November 22, 1899)	March 17, 2025	
31	Candon	Journey	Candon City Plaza, Candon, Ilocos Sur	Aguinaldo stayed in this town. (November 21–22, 1899)	November 22, 2024	
32	Tadian	Journey	Barangay Población, Tadian, Mountain Province	Aguinaldo passed through this town. (December 2, 1899)	May 3, 2025	
33	Kayan	Journey	Barangay Kayan West, Tadian, Mountain Province	Aguinaldo passed through this town. (December 3, 1899)	May 3, 2025	
34	Sagada	Journey	Junction of Tetepan Road and Sagada-Besao Road, Barangay Antadao, Sagada, Mountain Province	Aguinaldo passed through this town. (December 3, 1899)	May 4, 2025	
35	Bontoc	Journey	Bontoc Municipal Hall, Bontoc, Mountain Province	Aguinaldo passed through this town. (December 3-5, 1899)	May 5, 2025	
36	Talubin	Journey	Barangay Talubin, Bontoc, Mountain Province	Aguinaldo passed through this town. (December 5-6, 1899)	May 6, 2025	
37	Ambayuan (Bayyo)	Journey	Barangay Bayyo, Bontoc, Mountain Province	Aguinaldo passed through this barrio, from Mount Polis to Banaue. (December 6, 1899)	May 6, 2025	
38	Bundok Polis	Journey	Mount Polis, Bontoc, Mountain Province	Aguinaldo passed through this town. (December 6-7, 1899)	May 6, 2025	

== See also ==
- Historical markers of the Philippines
- List of Quincentennial historical markers in the Philippines
