= Chocolate industry in the Philippines =

The chocolate industry in the Philippines developed after the introduction of the cocoa tree to Philippine agriculture. The growing of cacao or cocoa boasts a long history stretching from the colonial times. Originating from Mesoamerican forests, cacao was first introduced by the Spanish colonizers four centuries ago. Since then the Philippine cocoa industry has been the primary producer of cocoa beans in Southeast Asia. There are many areas of production of cacao in the Philippines, owing to soil and climate. The chocolate industry is currently on a small to medium scale.

== Etymology and history ==
=== Local terms ===
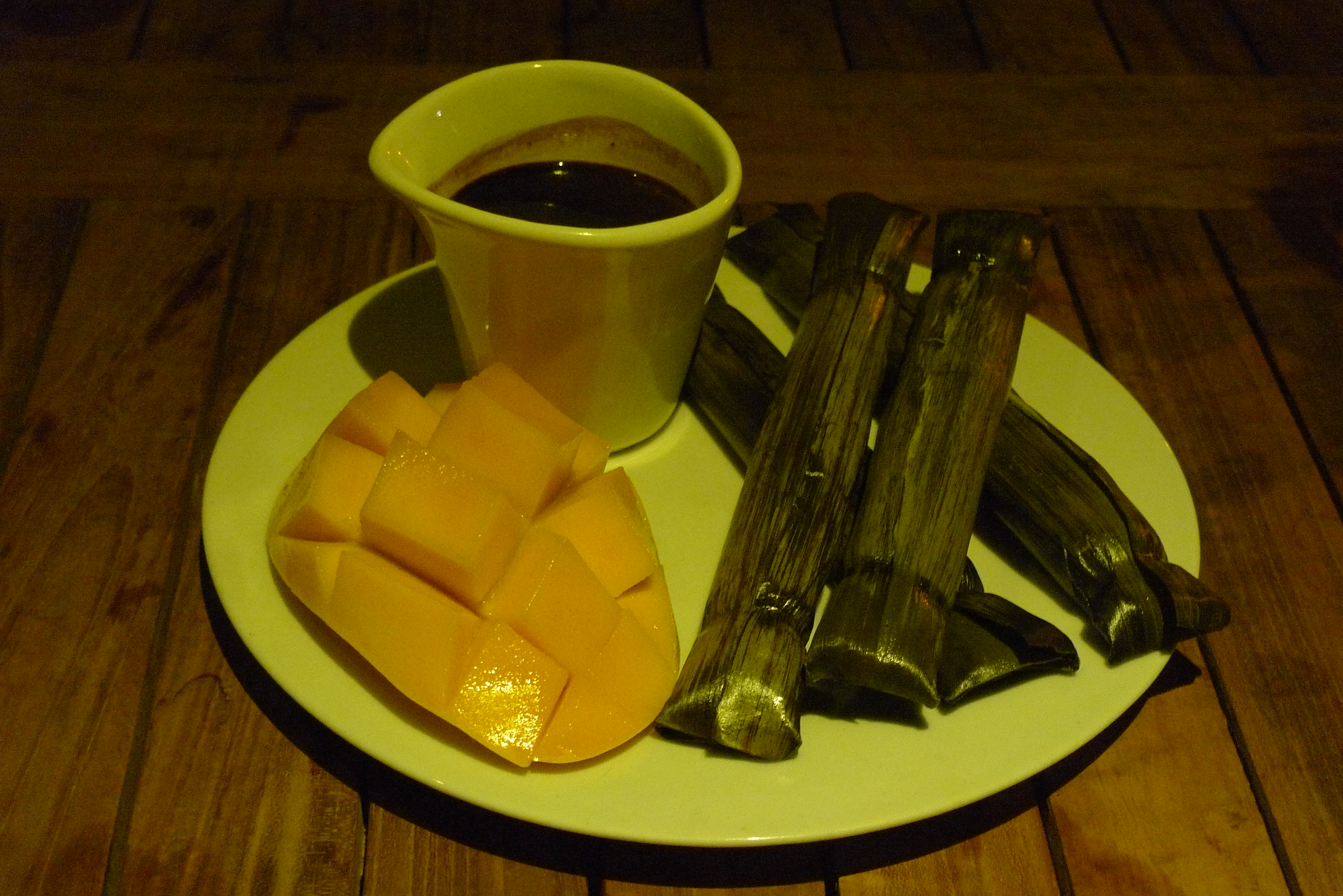
Tsokolate with suman rice cakes and ripe carabao mangoes

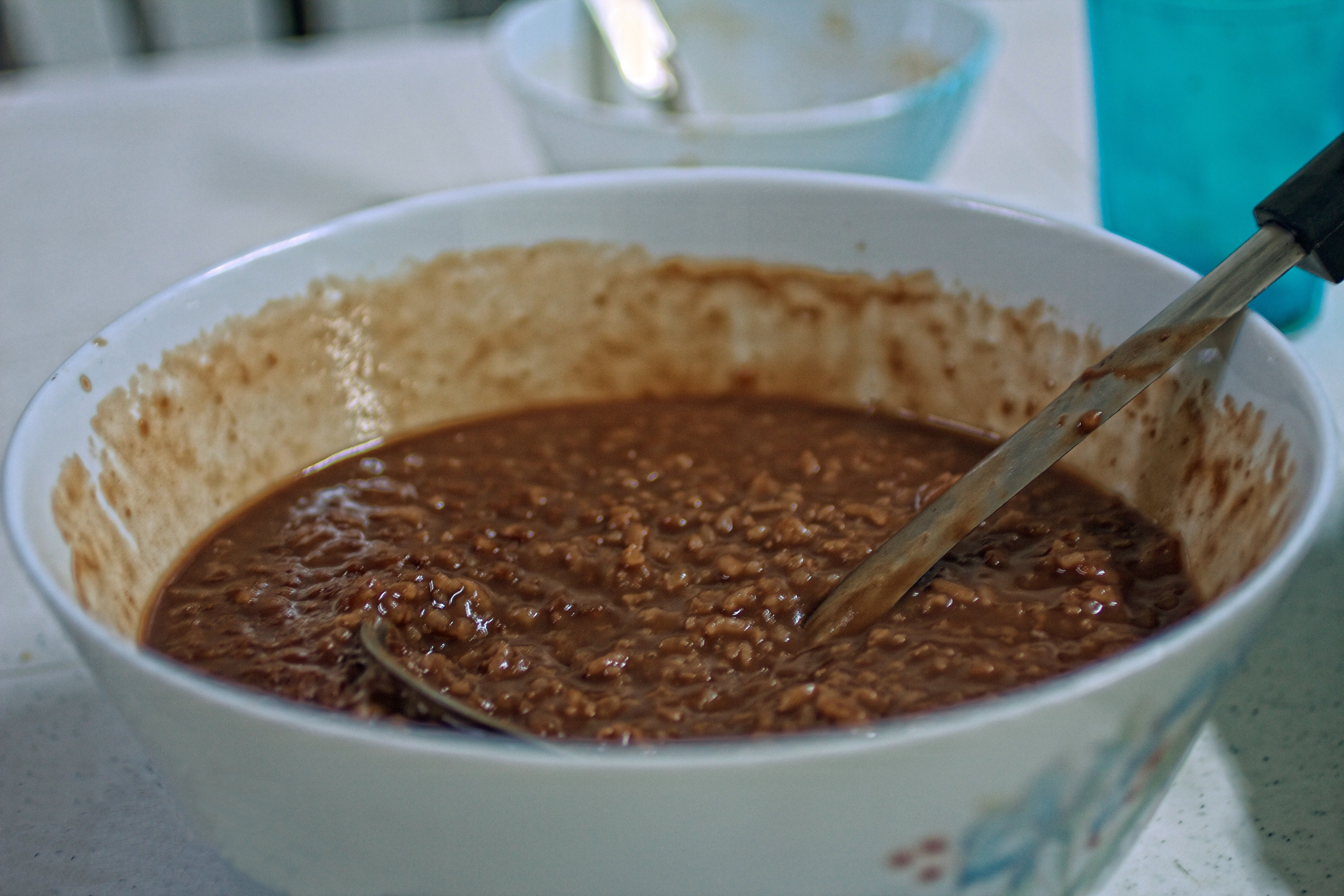
Champorado is a sweet chocolate rice porridge in Philippine cuisine.

In the Filipino language, chocolate translates as tsokolate, which is also a hot chocolate drink made from tablea, cacao tablets made from roasted and ground cacao nibs molded into rounds or tablets traditionally used in the Philippines for making hot chocolate. A batirol, the Filipino adaptation of the Mexican molinillo, is used to thoroughly mix hot water with the tablet in a chocolatera to make it frothy. The result is tsokolate de batirol, a thick, creamy, hot chocolate drink, otherwise referred to as sikawate in the Visayas region.

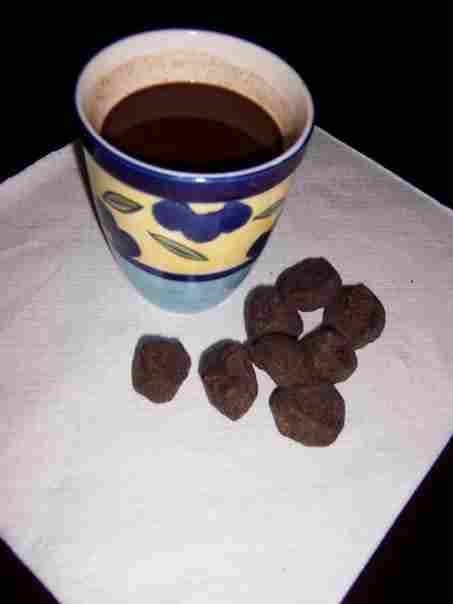
Tableya

Tablea is also used in the production of champorado, among many other cacao dishes and drinks. Written tsamporado in Filipino, it is a sweet, rice porridge dish in the Philippines enjoyed by many hot or cold, usually partnered with dried fish, called tuyo or daing.

=== Introduction of cacao to the Philippines ===
The cacao plant was primarily brought to the Philippines in the 1700s when a Spanish galleon from Mexico transported pure Criollo, considered to be one of the best kinds of cacao, from Mesoamerica to the Pacific. Although cacao trees were originally grown in Mexico and Central America, the Philippines became an ideal cultivation grounds for cacao because of its geography as a tropical rainforest located 10-15 degrees from the Earth's Equator, with the cacao belt located within 20 degrees of the Equator. Today, cacao trees are cultivated throughout equatorial region including the Caribbean, Africa, Southeast Asia, and the Pacific Islands of Samoa and New Guinea.

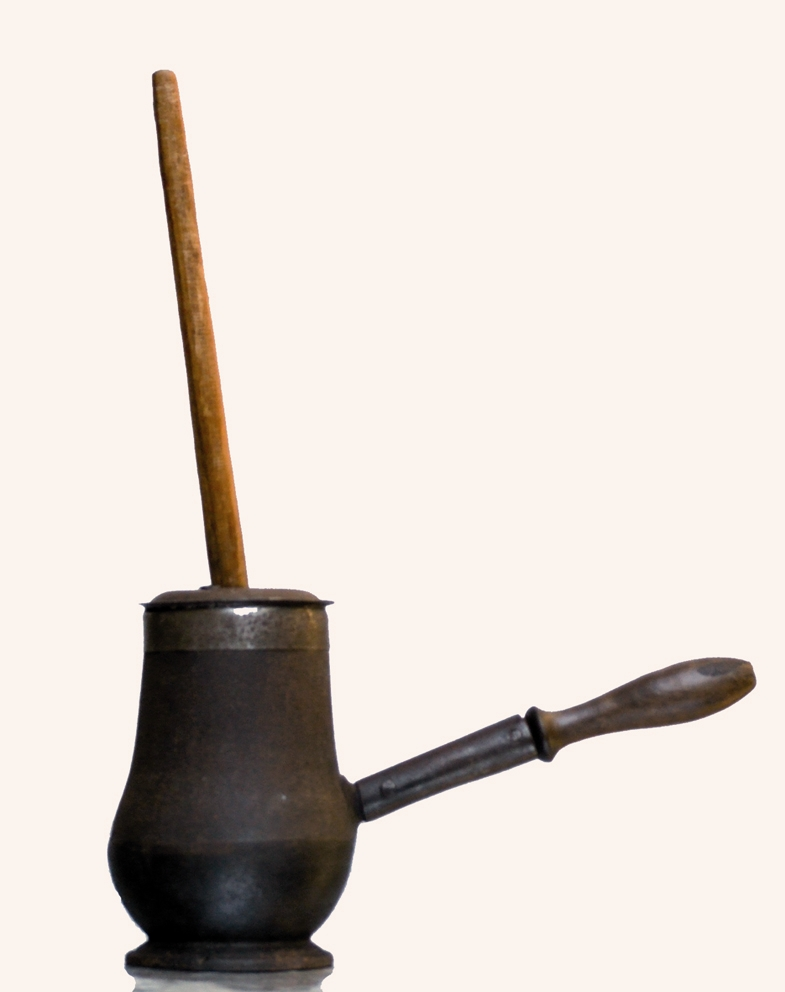
Chocolatera

=== Key areas for production of cacao ===
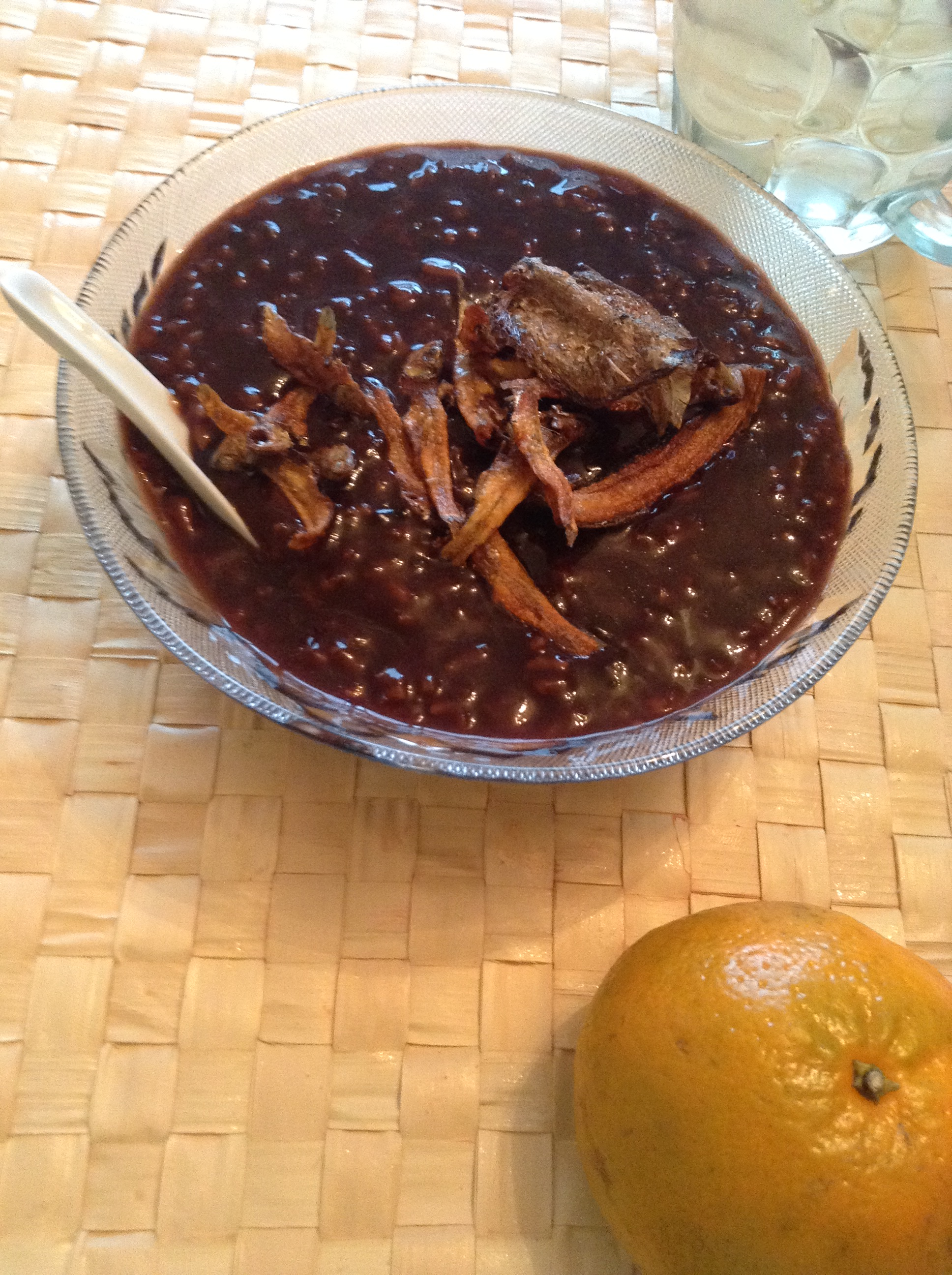
Tsampurado

Batangas

Although the province of Batangas only accounts for 0.47 metric tons of cacao production as of 2016, it is well known for its tsokolate tablea or chocolate tablets which are considered one of its delicacies and is often used to make traditional Filipino hot chocolate.

Cebu

Cebu along with other Central Visayas provinces contribute only around 1% of cacao production in the country, however, Cebu is known for producing quality cacao. Although there are currently less than a hundred farmer associations, cooperatives, and individual growers planting on an estimated 2,000 hectares in Cebu, the province aims to have a greater share in cacao production. The province is home to criollo or the "cacao bisaya", which is a superior quality cacao that has a strong, aromatic bittersweet taste and rich texture. It is also home to Ralfe Gourmet, The Chocolate Chamber, and Casa de Cacao headed by Raquel Choa who is known for elevating Philippine cacao-based products.

Davao Region

According to the Philippines Statistic Authority's CountrySTAT, 81% of annual production of cacao in the Philippines comes from the Davao region. Davao del Sur, Davao City, Davao del Norte, Davao Oriental, and Davao de Oro are the top 5 producers in terms of volume of production in 2016. There are also more than 20,000 hectares of cacao farms in the region, and Davao City, amongst the 5 provinces, has the largest area of 6,060 hectares. The region is also home to one of the well-known cacao agri-ventures in the country, Malagos chocolate.

=== Agencies and cooperatives on the chocolate industry ===
Department of Agriculture

A government agency, the Department of Agriculture (DA) oversees the advancement of agricultural development of the Philippines through the provisions of policies, public investments, and support services. The department provides a range from technical to financial support for cacao farmers since it considers cacao as a high-value crop based on Republic Act No. 7900 which seeks to "promote the production, processing, marketing and distribution of high-valued crops".

Department of Trade and Industry

The Department of Trade and Industry (DTI) is a Philippine government department in charge of attaining the country's goal of having a globally competitive and innovative industry and services sector which would lead to the creation of jobs and inclusive growth. They have created programs and policies in support of the growth of the cacao industry.

Department of Science and Technology - Philippine Council for Agriculture, Aquatic, and Natural Resources Research and Development

The Department of Science and Technology - Philippine Council for Agriculture, Aquatic, and Natural Resources Research and Development (DOST-PCAARRD) is the apex organization for R&D in the agriculture, aquatic and natural resources sectors (AANR) in the Philippines. It is mandated to formulate policies, plans, programs, projects, and strategies for S&T development in AANR; program and allocate R&D funds; monitor and evaluate R&D programs and projects and other S&T activities; and generate external funds for R&D. DOST-PCAARRD, together with its partners, crafted the Industry Strategic Science and Technology Programs for Cacao, which contains all the science and technology initiatives towards the development of the industry.

CocoaPhil

Cocoa Foundation of the Philippines (CocoaPhil) is a non-profit, umbrella organization which represents the interests of the local cocoa industry. Their aim is to increase the number of hectares growing cocoa with the goal of achieving the Philippines Cacao Roadmap made by the Department of Agriculture and the Department of Trade and Industry. The specific objective of the organization is to develop at least 100,000 hectares into cacao farms as an intercrop under coconut trees.

CIDAMi

An active cacao value-chain organization in the agri-enterprise section, Cacao Industry Development Association of Mindanao Inc. (CIDAMi) is composed of members ranging from farmers to academe with the vision of world quality cacao-producing Mindanao. CIDAMi has several projects, services and training partnered with professional organizations to accomplish its vision like CaCao Feast and Cacao Doctors Training.

FedCo

The Federation of Cooperatives in Mindanao (FedCo) is a secondary cooperative based in Mindanao with the aim to improve the socio-economic condition of its members through the export of the best quality agricultural products like cacao and bananas in the international stage. Their operation is centered around the empowerment of small farmers by directly connecting them to international buyers.

CACAO

Center for Advanced Community Agriculture Operations (CACAO) is a group of agriculture enthusiasts who aim to provide solutions in the production and marketing issues in agriculture. Specifically will try to come up with programs that will provide sustainable livelihood to small farmers and produce enough if not more supply in the market.

== Chocolate industry in the Philippines ==
=== Industry background ===
Cacao, which originated from South American forests, is the source material of chocolate products. However, modern cacao is mostly produced by African and European countries such as the Ivory Coast, Germany and Belgium. As a minor player in the global industry, the Philippines also engages in cacao cultivation nearly everywhere around the archipelago, even during the early 1900s.

==== Cacao industry ====
The Philippine cacao industry consists mostly of smallholder farmers who supply medium-scale manufacturers. However, local cacao demand outweighs the cacao supply both locally and globally. One major factor that affects cacao production in the country is "the lack of post-harvest knowledge, equipment, and facilities to ensure bean quality for chocolate manufacturing." Since that is the case, cacao exports are far less than country's imports. The Department of Trade and Industry Reports that in 2012, cacao imports amounted to 3,662 tons, while cacao exports amounted to only 512 tons.

Imports of Cocoa and Cocoa Preparations (million kg.)

	2009	2010	2011	2012	2013
Cocoa beans, whole or broken, raw or roasted	123	738	307	150	223
Cocoa shells, husks, skins and waste	2,151	2,032	1,753	1,969	2,633
Cocoa paste	6,080	5,434	4,522	640	579
Cocoa powder, unsweetened	13,284	15,024	13,872	11,120	13,340
Chocolate and other foods containing cocoa	11,645	12,453	12,711	13,939	16,655

Exports of Cocoa and Cocoa Preparations (million kg.)

	2009	2010	2011	2012	2013
Cocoa beans, whole or broken, raw or roasted	299	196	127	440	554
Cocoa shells, husks, skins and waste	20	-	-	-	-
Cocoa paste	121	41	265	245	138
Cocoa powder, unsweetened	313	663	812	21	15
Chocolate and other foods containing cocoa	784	863	786	1,028	3,002

==== Growing market opportunity for tablea ====
Recent increase in the number of cafes and restaurants offering chocolate or chocolate-based drinks provided for the relative rise of tablea market opportunities. In addition to that, healthy lifestyle trends in the past years contributed to this gradual increase of demand. This is seen as a good sign of possible profit translation for cacao farmers and manufacturers.

=== Industry size ===
==== Philippine market ====
The four largest companies in the Philippines processing cocoa are Universal Robina, Comfoods, Delfi and Rebisco—all of which are located within Metro Manila. Also contributing to the chocolate market in the country are several commercial brands such as Nestlé, Hershey's, and Cadbury.

Local and Foreign Cocoa-processing Companies

Local	Foreign
Republic Biscuit Corporation	Nestlé Philippines Inc.
Columbia International Food Products Inc.	Hershey's Philippines Inc.
Monde Nissin	Cadbury Adams (Philippines) Inc.
Twin Oaks Foods Corporation	Mars Philippines Inc.
Stateline Snack Food Corporation	Gandour Philippines Inc.
New Unity Sweets Manufacturing	Delfi Philippines Inc.
Annie Candy Manufacturing (Annie's)	Rustan's Marketing Specialists, Inc.
Gracepoint Enterprises (Lala)	
Commonwealth Foods, Inc.	Mayora Philippines
Malagos Chocolate	

==== Other local brands ====
===== Mama Earth Cacao =====
Has farms in Monkayo and produces in Samal Island. Maker of tableas, chocolate, Nibs and cocao power.

===== CACAO Davao =====
CACAO Davao by Calinan Cacao Products supplies raw cacao products like cacao beans, cacao nibs, and cacao liquor. CACAO is an acronym for Center for Advanced Community Agriculture Operations. The processing is based in Calinan, Davao City. CACAO Davao works in close partnership with existing local processors and producers.

===== Theo & Philo =====
Theo & Philo Artisan Chocolate was started by Philo Chua in 2010. It is the first bean-to-bar, single origin chocolate maker in the Philippines and ignited the rebirth of the Philippine cocoa. Theo & Philo Chocolate started the Philippine Bean to Bar movement, making the Philippine Chocolate a premium chocolate. Theo and Philo Chocolate has the honor to be part of Philippine Presidential Gifts of choice of brand. It is also a multi-awarded chocolate from Academy of Chocolates, International Chocolate Awards, Northwest Chocolate Festival, Katha Award Theo & Philo chocolates undergo a six step process to develop its quality. The flavors include Dark Chocolate with Calamansi, Milk Chocolate Adobo, Dark Chocolate Siling Labuyo, Milk Chocolate with Barako Coffee and Dark Chocolate with Green Mango and Sea Salt.

===== Malagos =====
Malagos Chocolate is a single origin chocolate producer from Davao. Malagos is a word meaning "malakas na agos" or "strong flow of water". Malagos is a farm at the foot of Mt. Talomo in Barangay Baguio District, said to be along the equator where the cacao thrives best. The process of planting, growing, fermentation, drying, sorting, roasting, and production of the chocolate is done on this farm.

===== Fabros Farm =====
The Fabros Farm covers around 50 hectares and 30,000 tree seedlings are planted. It has two locations – Agtedtedted, the pioneer farm, and Mumunsi, in Aurora. Cacao is endemic in Maria Aurora and cacao trees are grown in backyards. Mumunsi Chocolate Café is named after the mountain where cacao trees are planted.

===== Ralfe Gourmet =====
Raquel Choa was taught by her grandmother on how to plant cacao. She eventually became a tablea maker and is the founder and president of Ralfe Gourmet. Ralfe Gourmet produces tablea that is 100% cacao. To produce their cacao, the beans are roasted, fermented, and solar-dried.

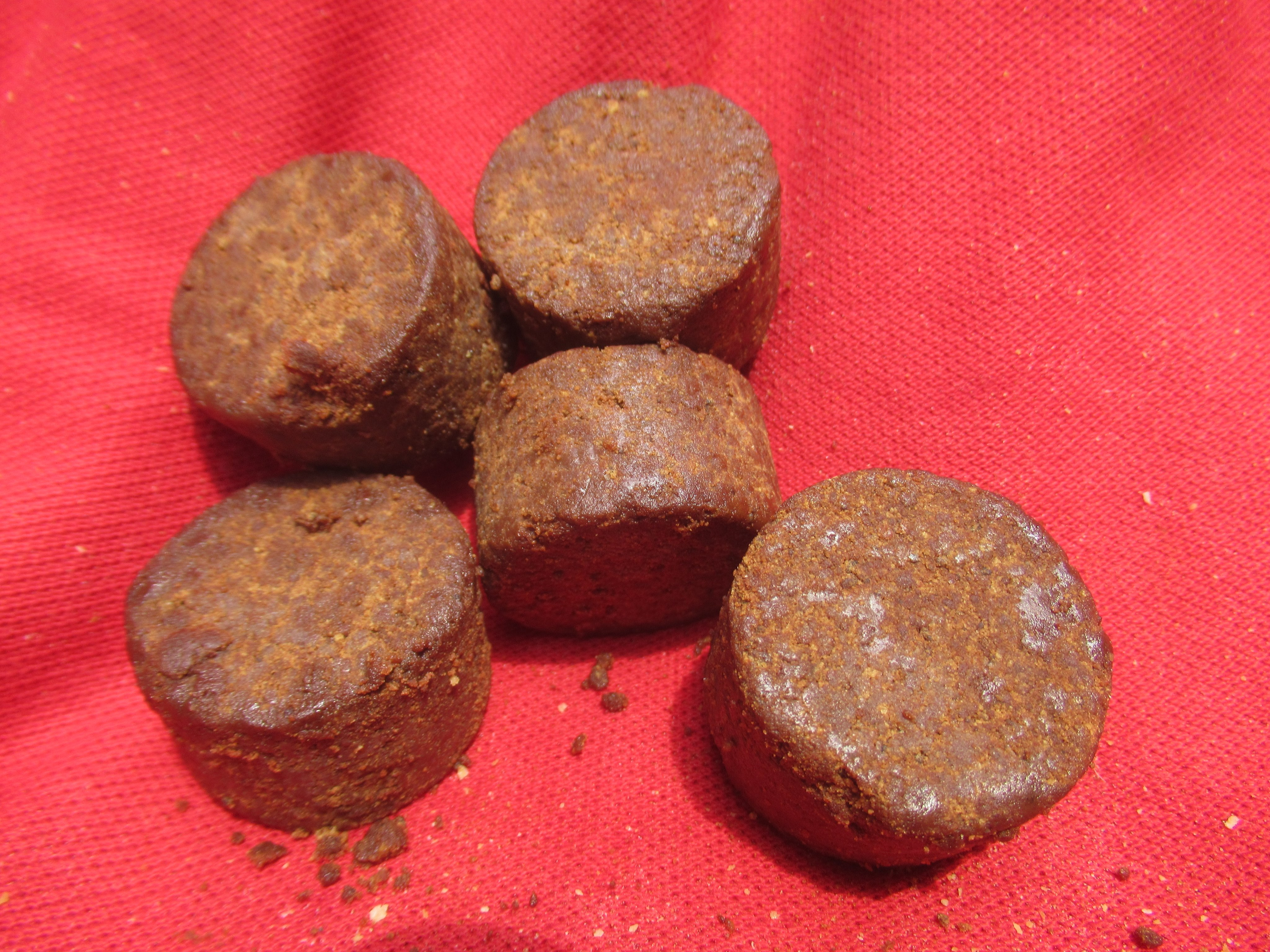
Tsokolate de Ylocos Cacao Tablea (Salcedo)

===== Tsokolate de Ylocos Cacao Tablea =====
In January, 2024, the Department of Science and Technology and the Department of Trade and Industry assisted Tsokolate de Ylocos Cacao Tablea Ministry of Micro, Small and Medium Enterprises per the Small Enterprise Technology Upgrading Program. The MSME produced cacao tablea, coconut cacao jam, cacao dark chocolate, cacao toffee candy and sugar-free tablea. Emmylou Jomero's Wynn’s Food Products are sourced from Salcedo, Ilocos Sur towering cacao trees and started in 2015. She was Top 5 in the Best 70% Dark Chocolate Contest of Kakao Konek in Davao City in 2019 and an awardee in the Kannawidan Ylocos Festival in Ilocos Sur.

=== Local manufacturers ===
==== Universal Robina Corp. ====
Universal Robina Corporation (URC) is one of the largest food and beverage manufacturers in the Philippines. They became famous for their instant coffee mix which catered towards Filipinos. They are also the company behind the Jack 'n Jill brand which currently produces 26 snack products under its name. The Jack 'n Jill products are classified into three categories: Salty Snacks, Bakery, Confectionery. URC is one of the heaviest consumers of chocolate because majority of their Bakery and Confectionery snacks incorporate chocolate. URC's first breakthrough chocolate product was the Nips. The candy coated chocolate, similar to the famous M&M's, which was popular among kids. This was successfully followed by multiple chocolate products such as the chocolate covered marshmallow, Wiggles; the chewy butterscotch caramel, Chooey Choco; the chocolate coated nougat bar, Cloud 9.

==== Commonwealth Foods Inc. ====
Commonwealth Foods Incorporated is a multiproduct Philippine based company that produces coffee, chocolate, and biscuit products. Their chocolate production is overseen by the Philippine Food Industries Incorporated branch which is also known as the Philfood division. They are responsible for producing natural cocoa powder which does not go through Dutch-process procedures. They also produce chocolate syrup, mint-candy covered chocolate, Kool Joy; chocolate candy, Flat tops; and Cocoa Butter. They have reached consumers abroad by supplying cocoa butter to consumers from the United States of America and Europe. Commonwealth Food Incorporated also has a division that produces biscuits. The Fibisco Biscuit Corporation is responsible for the production of Filipino-favorite chocolate snacks such as the Choco Mallows, Hi-ro, and Chocolate Chip cookies.

==== Republic Biscuit Corporation ====
Republic Biscuit Corporation (Rebisco) is a Philippine snack food company that produces biscuits and other snack foods. In 2006, Rebisco launched their own chocolate bar brand, Choco Mucho.

=== Future of the Philippine chocolate industry ===
The supply of cocoa has fluctuated in recent years due to climate and economic factors. The El Niño phenomenon that hit in the year 2009 greatly reduced the cocoa production in the following years. The extreme weather conditions added to the impending financial crises to limit both the supply and demand for cocoa. Cocoa supply is still decreasing even if the demand is rising. Many entrepreneurs and governments have been looking into cocoa production recently as demand for chocolate rises. They are looking to compete with the top producer of the plant which is Africa. They produce more than 70% of the global cocoa supply. On the other hand, Netherlands and United States of America are the largest consumers of cocoa beans; both consuming billions of U.S dollars' worth of the product.

According to the United Nations Commodity Trade Statistics Database, the Philippines has shifted from a massive importer of cocoa beans into a steady exporter of the bean. Entrepreneurs had seen the potential of the cocoa bean industry. The increase in demand and the falling supply was obvious to them, therefore giving them the idea of planting many hectares of the plant. The Philippine government has also been encouraging the citizens to grow cocoa beans because of the shortage. They are assisting farmers and the industry by supplying land and tested procedures in order to increase the Philippine production of cocoa beans. The Philippines has the right climate and soil for the cocoa tree which leaves the government the problem of spreading the knowledge on how to plant and harvest for cocoa. Currently, they are making steady efforts to compete with other cocoa producers. The Philippine government is preparing for the cocoa shortage by the year 2020 and aims to increase production to 100,000 metric tons. Although the Philippines is failing to meet the local demand of 30,000 metric tons, the strong effort and government support is sure to make an impact in years to come.

== Cocoa production in the Philippines ==
In the Philippines, cacao or cocoa beans are produced in locations including Luzon, Mindanao, Joló, Basilan, Panay, Negros, Cebú, Bohol, Masbate. Cocoa also refers to cocoa powder and cocoa butter, which are two by-products of the cacao bean after it has undergone processing. Cocoa and chocolate processing was first introduced in the country by Commonwealth Foods Inc. (ComFoods) in 1953, while Serg's Chocolate Products Inc. became the first modern chocolate manufacturing plant in Southeast Asia.

=== Process ===
==== Planting and farming ====
For planting cacao in the Philippines, there are currently nine registered and approved varieties by the National Seed Industry of the Council of the Bureau of Plant Industry. These are based on high productivity, quality of the bean, consumer acceptability and resistance to pests and diseases. Soil requirements include good soil structure, which is deep and well-drained, but with sufficient water-holding capacity. Clay loam soil with an aggregate of sand, silt and clay work best due to its large pore spaces which "promote aeration, drainage, and moisture retention". Organic matter in the surface layer or soil is also important to cacao growth so the soil must be well-shaded to preserve the organic layer. Ideal rainfall and climate on the other hand is between 1,250 and 3,000 mm per annum, 1,500 to 2,000 mm in the dry season of not more than three months, and a temperature of 18–32 °C (64–90 °F). This suitable temperature can be found in altitudes up to 700 meters or in areas between 300 and 1,200 meters above sea level. Because Cacao prefers a moisture-laden atmosphere, a climate of evenly distributed rainfall and few winds are ideal.

After the seeds are selected carefully from highly productive trees which pest-free and disease-free, seeds are planted immediately either "at stake", controlled seed beds, pots, or nurseries before they are transplanted to plantations. When field soils are forest land with good organic matter, tillage is not necessary. However, if the cacao is to be planted with other cash crops, a more thorough preparation, which includes plowing and harrowing the land, is needed. Roads, drainage, and shade trees are also established. Based on studies about distancing, cacao is generally planted in the following: cacao laid in rows 2 meters apart if open areas, 2.5 meters away from the base if under coconut trees, close planting followed by thinning, or 3 by 3 meters or 3 by 4 meters apart.

Although trees raised from seeds are still practiced, grafted, budded, or asexually propagated cacao seedlings are now also practiced.

==== Pruning ====
Pruning is generally done with great care using a sharp saw during dry season, when branches have come out, or after harvest as to control the height of the tree and facilitate the work. The first pruning, which is done to control the height of where the first branch is formed, is generally at least 5 feet, so as not to hinder harvesting and maintenance. When five or more branches have grown, weak branches are pruned, leaving only "three or four well-developed branches". The surfaces with cuts are then painted with coal tar or lead paint so as to protect the cuts from diseases or pests.

==== Nutrition and fertilizers ====
The health of cacao trees are examined based on soil and leaf analyses. Mineral deficiencies are documented to determine fertilizer requirements. Fertilizers are applied on Cacao around two to three months after transplanting and are increased in the second, third and fourth year of a tree. The fertilizers used on Cacao include ammonium sulfate, Single superphosphate, potassium sulfate, and magnesium sulfate.

==== Harvesting ====
Cacao pods are harvested as soon as they are ripe or mature. The ripening period of cacao generally happens during dry season and can be determined either by the aroma of chocolate that pervades the plantation or the changing of pod color wherein they turn reddish or yellow according to the variety. The pods are harvested using a sharp instrument such as a knife and are cut as close to the stem as possible. This is done with utmost care so as not to damage the flower cushions, pods, and tree itself. Infested pods are removed. About four harvest cycles with 10 to 21 days intervals are generally made per season.

==== Sorting and grading ====
Sorting and grading will enhance bean quality. When the beans have completely dried, they are sorted and graded to remove flat, slaty, black, moldy, small, double beans and beans with insect damage. Beans are usually graded based on proportion of defective beans indicated by the Philippine National Standards for Cacao or Cocoa Beans. These processing and manufacturing guidelines successfully ensure quality before they are shipped or handled.

==== Packaging and storage ====
The dried cocoa beans are packed in bags made of food-grade or non-toxic materials such as jute bags or sacks that an imprint of the label, production number, date, the grade of the beans, code of the cooperative, farmer or area. They are stored in weatherproof, well ventilated, free from moisture, insects, or any other factor that can contaminate the cacao.

=== Output ===
After the seeds are shipped to different manufacturers, they are used for making cocoa powder, cocoa butter, the processing of tablea (cocoa liquor) and other chocolate products such as liquid chocolate, and chocolate bars. Tablea and cocoa powder are also used to create a variety of products such as hot chocolate, champorado, tablea de cacao cupcakes, tablea brownies, crinkles etc.

For chocolate bar flavors, Filipino chocolate brands such as Theo and Philo, Risa, CocoDolce, Kablon, and others, offer unique flavors that include chili, mango, calamansi, barako coffee, adobo, pili nuts, pastillas, bacon, turon, and coconut.

== See also ==
- Cocoa production in Japan

== Sources ==
- Juan, Pacita U.; Ramos, Josephine V.; Francisco, Ma Regina S. (2013). Cacao bean to bar: a cacao growers manual. Mandaluyong, Philippines: Anvil Publishing, Inc. ISBN 978-0-8014-0786-4.
