= Malagos =

Malagos is a barangay in Baguio District, Davao City, Philippines. It may also refer to:

- Malagos Chocolate, a chocolate company where it is based.
- Malagos Garden Resort, an agri-ecotourism site where it is located.
