= Sport management =

Field of education concerning the business aspects of sports and recreation

Sport management, also referred to as sport administration, is the field of business dealing with sports and recreation. Sports management involves any combination of skills that correspond with planning, organizing, directing, controlling, budgeting, leading, or evaluating of any organization or business within the sports field. The field of sport management has its origins in physical education departments. The discipline has evolved to incorporate history and sociology. Sport management has also extended to esport management growing to a $4.5 billion dollar industry by 2018. The opportunities in sport management have expanded to include sports marketing, sports media analytics, sports sponsorships and sports facilities management.

== Education ==
Bachelor's and master's degrees in sport management are offered by many colleges and universities. Some research on the impact of sport degrees has focused on sport science. There are various degrees you can earn for Sport Management, including a bachelor of science in Sport Management, bachelor of business administration in Sport Management, an MBA in Sport Management and a Ph.D in Sport Management.

The sport and entertainment industry is increasing globally. The business side of sport and various verticals of the industry can include sports leagues, sports infrastructures, sports tourism, sporting national governing body & federation, sporting goods and services, or sports media. The industry demands skilled managers and professionals in every vertical.

== Jobs ==
American sport management roles pay an average of $41,645 annually. In America, jobs in sport management include working for professional sports leagues like the NFL, NBA, MLB, NHL, MLS, and other professional or non-professional sport leagues in terms of marketing, health, and promotions.

== See also ==
- Hungarian system
