= Lexus (disambiguation) =

Lexus is the luxury vehicle division of Japanese automaker Toyota. It may also refer to its automobile branches:

- Lexus F, the performance division of Lexus
- Lexus LF, the line of concept vehicles from Lexus

Lexus may also refer to:

- Lexus Cup, the LPGA tournament played between 2005 and 2008
- Lexus Gauntlet, the college football competition held from 2001 to 2009
- Usha Lexus, a Shriram Group brand used for phones, furniture, and hotels in SE Asia
- Lexus Cream Sandwich, a brand of Munchy Food Industries Sdn Bhd

== See also ==
- Lexis (linguistics), the linguistic term and variants
- LexisNexis, a proprietary online information database
