= Hungarian system =

The Hungarian System, or Brodlowsky System, is a set of rules for sporting tournaments which was popular in Eastern Europe in the 1980s. It was created in 1979 by Ivan Brodlowsky, the creator of 2x Hunter Ball. He called it the Hungarian System of Classification, or simply the 'Brodlowsky System'. It was to show that socialists could create their own system of sport management.

In 1981, the Hungarian Federation of Basketball adopted his idea, the Ukrainian Pelota Basca tournament soon followed, as did the Bulgarians in their 1987 basketball competition.

The Brodlowsky system survived until the end of that decade, there are still some examples of it around the world, such as: - Irish Rugby Union (1998/99); - South African National Badminton Championship (1991 to 1995); - Mexican Casting Party (1989 to 2003); - Texas Amateur Pickleball Prize, and others.

== The Rules ==
- Traditional (League) Organisation: competitors play against all the others (usually twice - home and away);

- Number of finalists vary from 3 to 8, normally;

- Key-bouts: These are chosen in order to promote competitors to the next stage.

The idea of 'key-bouts' is essential in this system. Brodlowsky says that teams have to qualify during the tournament, not after. Thus, it's important to determine the bouts in which competitors that occupy the first place in these moments will qualify themselves to the next stage.

== Examples ==
Regular Tournament

National Hungarian Championship – Basketball (1981)

Number of competitors: 8 Following stage: semi-final round Key-bouts: 2nd, 4th, 6th, 8th.

This is the most classic example of this system, as we have four different qualified teams. After the second bout, Budapest Labda Club had two successes and occupied the first position. However, after the fourth bout, Basket Club TG was the first, and so this was another qualified. After the sixth bout, Basket Club TG lost its first position to Grand Voyage, which couldn't maintain it until the last bout, when Magyaro Club got it. So, we have four different qualified teams: Budapest Labda Club, Basket Club TG, Grand Voyage and Magyaro Club, which played normal semi-finals after that.

Exception Tournament

Mexican Casting Party – (2002)

Number of competitors: 32 Following stage: quarter-final round Key-bouts: 1st, 6th, 12th, 18th, 24th, 30th, 31st, 32nd.

In this example, we can see that it's not necessary to choose symmetrically the key-bouts – it depends on the goals of the tournament. In this case, managers chose the three last bouts to be key-bouts, giving special attention to the consistent competitors.

The tournament had 5 qualified competitors. However, and incongruency happened: Lucas Fernandez, with only 9 victories, was qualified after the first bout; Juan de Castro, with 17 victories, after the sixth bout; but Johnny Cudanrot, in the third position and with 28 victories, couldn't classify himself. Asked about what managers should do with this, Brodlowsky explained: “It's necessary to make an extra-match between Johnny Cudanrot and Lucas Fernandez. Why? Because Cudanrot has more winnings than half of the other qualified (actually, 3/5 of them). So, it's unfair not to give him an opportunity. In my opinion, as the creator of this system, an extra-game between Cudanrot and Fernandez is the best solution”. Of course, Brodlowsky was heard, the game was made and a surprise happened: Fernandez won that match and all the others, turning into the champion of that season!

This article is quoting many pages of the József Varga's Theory of Sport Management

== See also ==
- Glossaries of sports
- Hungary
- Bodlowsky
- Basketball
- Casting (fishing)
