= Salcedo, Ilocos Sur =

Municipality in Ilocos Sur, Philippines

Salcedo Bauguen
- Municipality
- Municipality of Salcedo
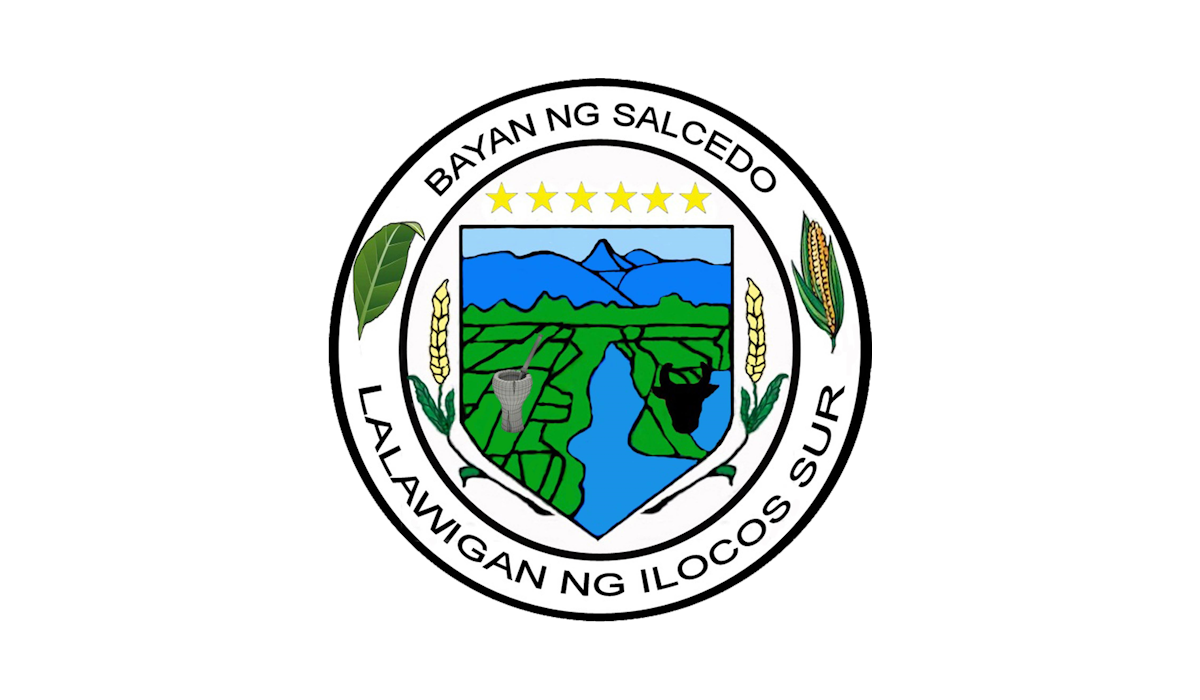
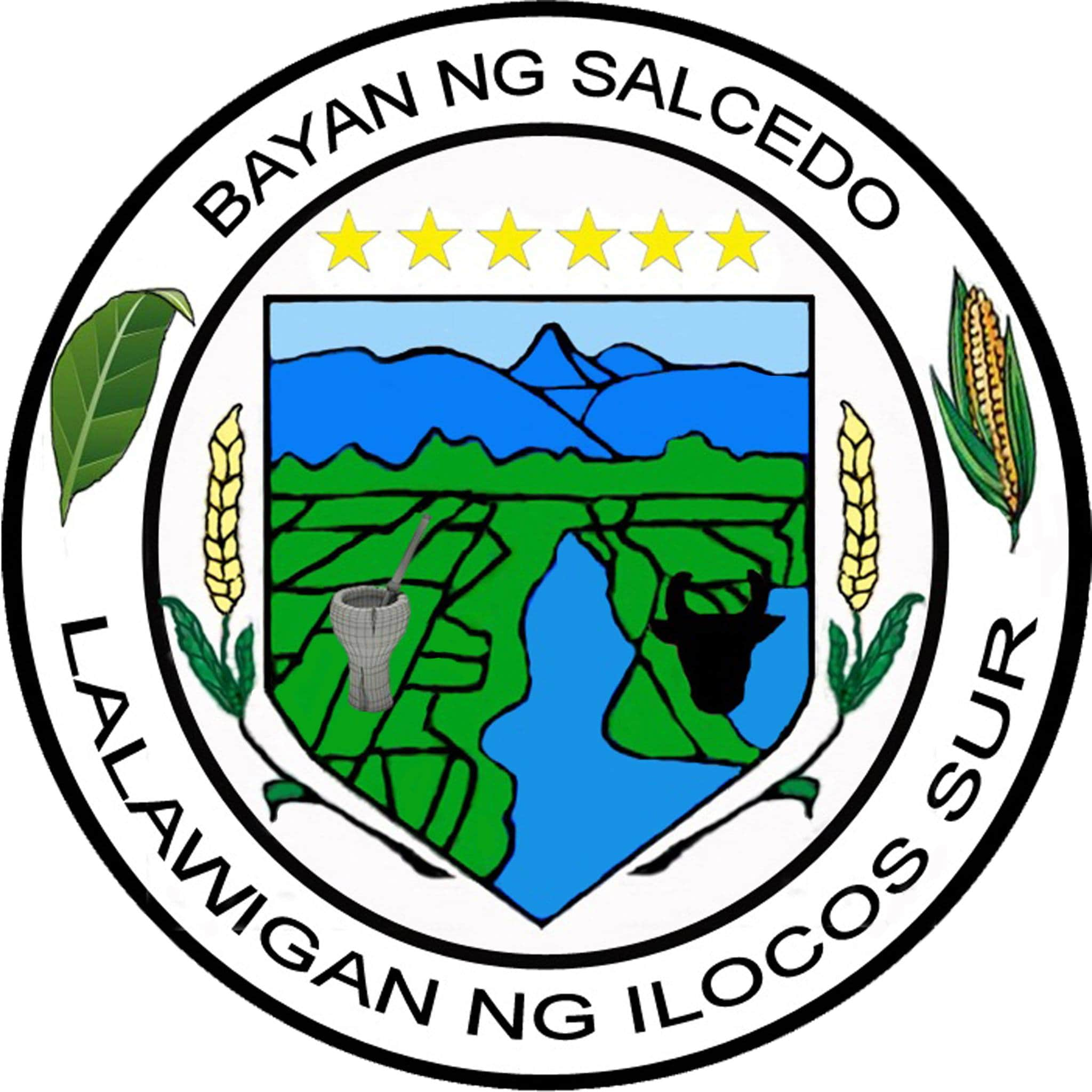
- Flag Seal
- Motto: Banat Salcedo
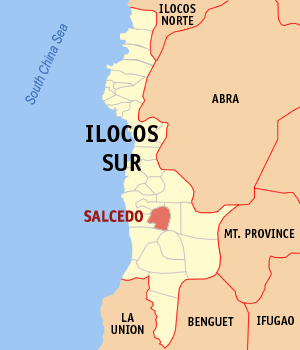
- Map of Ilocos Sur with Salcedo highlighted
- Interactive map of Salcedo
- Location within the Philippines
- Coordinates: 17°09′06″N 120°32′10″E
- Country: Philippines
- Region: Ilocos Region
- Province: Ilocos Sur
- District: 2nd district
- Named for: Juan de Salcedo
- Barangays: 21 (see Barangays)

Government
  - Type: Sangguniang Bayan
  - Mayor: Leopoldo G. Gironella Jr.
  - Vice Mayor: Grazielle G. Itchon
  - Representative: Kristine Singson-Meehan
  - Municipal Council: Members: Ruel B. Ronquillo; Dominador V. Bang-asan; Domingo D. Gironella; Rogelio T. Biteng; Laureano C. Roldan; Charlie S. Nang; Larry A. del Rosario; Ernesto L. Cottong
  - Electorate: 8,023 voters (2025)

Area
  - Total: 103.44 km^{2} (39.94 sq mi)
- Elevation: 212 m (696 ft)
- Highest elevation: 907 m (2,976 ft)
- Lowest elevation: 15 m (49 ft)

Population (2024 census)
  - Total: 11,196
  - Density: 108.24/km^{2} (280.33/sq mi)
  - Households: 2,836

Economy
  - Income class: 1st municipal income class
  - Poverty incidence: 7.81% (2023)
  - Revenue: ₱ 669.5 million (2024)
  - Assets: ₱ 2,685 million (2024)
  - Expenditure: ₱ 311.3 million (2024)
  - Liabilities: ₱ 176.1 million (2024)

Service provider
  - Electricity: Ilocos Sur Electric Cooperative (ISECO)
- Time zone: UTC+8 (PST)
- ZIP code: 2711
- PSGC: 0102916000
- IDD : area code: +63 (0)77
- Native languages: Ilocano; Tagalog
- Website: www.salcedo-ilocossur.gov.ph

Salcedo, officially the Municipality of Salcedo (Ilocano: Ili ti Salcedo; Filipino: Bayan ng Salcedo), is a municipality in the province of Ilocos Sur, Philippines. According to the 2024 census, it has a population of 11,196 people.

== Etymology ==
Formerly known as Baugen, it was renamed Salcedo on June 20, 1957 by virtue of Republic Act No. 1627, after the Spanish conquistador Juan de Salcedo.

== Geography ==
Salcedo is situated 72.18 kilometres (44.85 mi) from the provincial capital Vigan, and 348.18 kilometres (216.35 mi) from the country's capital city of Manila.

=== Barangays ===
Salcedo is politically subdivided into 21 barangays. Each barangay consists of puroks and some have sitios.

- Atabay
- Balidbid
- Baluarte
- Baybayading
- Boguibog
- Bulala-Leguey
- Calangcuasan
- Culiong
- Dinaratan
- Kaliwakiw
- Kinmarin
- Lucbuban
- Madarang
- Maligcong
- Pias
- Poblacion Norte
- Poblacion Sur
- San Gaspar
- San Tiburcio
- Sorioan
- Ubbog

=== Climate ===
Climate data for Salcedo, Ilocos Sur
Month	Jan	Feb	Mar	Apr	May	Jun	Jul	Aug	Sep	Oct	Nov	Dec	Year
Mean daily maximum °C (°F)	30 (86)	31 (88)	32 (90)	33 (91)	32 (90)	31 (88)	30 (86)	29 (84)	30 (86)	31 (88)	31 (88)	30 (86)	31 (88)
Mean daily minimum °C (°F)	20 (68)	21 (70)	22 (72)	24 (75)	25 (77)	25 (77)	25 (77)	25 (77)	24 (75)	23 (73)	22 (72)	20 (68)	23 (73)
Average precipitation mm (inches)	27 (1.1)	31 (1.2)	40 (1.6)	71 (2.8)	207 (8.1)	237 (9.3)	286 (11.3)	261 (10.3)	261 (10.3)	254 (10.0)	88 (3.5)	46 (1.8)	1,809 (71.3)
Average rainy days	9.4	9.3	12.7	17.0	25.4	26.8	27.4	26.1	25.0	21.0	15.5	10.6	226.2
Source: Meteoblue (modeled/calculated data, not measured locally)

== Demographics ==
Population census of Salcedo
Year	Pop.	±% p.a.
1903	1,504	—
1918	2,200	+2.57%
1939	5,065	+4.05%
1948	4,771	−0.66%
1960	6,005	+1.94%
1970	6,992	+1.53%
1975	7,978	+2.68%
1980	8,302	+0.80%
1990	9,397	+1.25%
1995	10,116	+1.39%
2000	10,409	+0.61%
2007	10,704	+0.39%
2010	10,935	+0.78%
2015	11,288	+0.61%
2020	11,110	−0.33%
2024	11,196	+0.19%
Source: Philippine Statistics Authority

In the 2024 census, Salcedo had a population of 11,196 people. The population density was 110 inhabitants per square kilometre (280/sq mi).

== Economy ==
Poverty incidence of Salcedo (%)

Source: Philippine Statistics Authority

The people are engaged in farming, producing food crops, mostly rice and tobacco.

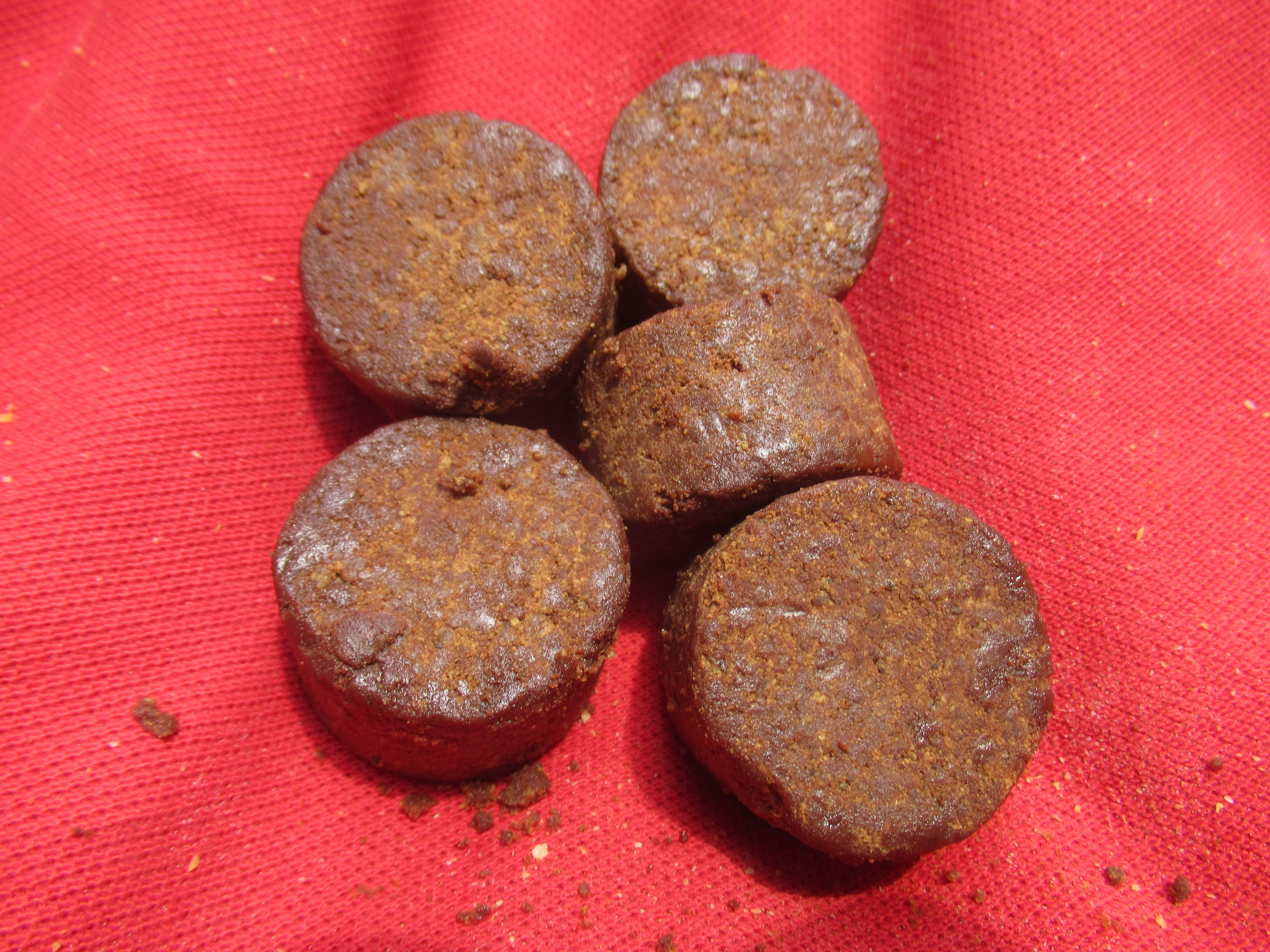
Tsokolate de Ylocos Cacao Tablea

In January 2024, the Department of Science and Technology and the Department of Trade and Industry assisted Tsokolate de Ylocos Cacao Tablea Ministry of Micro, Small and Medium Enterprises per the Small Enterprise Technology Upgrading Program of the Chocolate industry in the Philippines. The MSME produces cacao tablea, coconut cacao jam, cacao dark chocolate, cacao toffee candy, sugar-free tablea, dragon fruit vinegar, dragon fruit juice, chili garlic oil, and fried garlic.

Emmylou Jomero's Wynn’s Food Products are sourced from Salcedo's towering cacao trees and started in 2015. In 2019, she was Top 5 in the Best 70% Dark Chocolate Contest of Kakao Konek in Davao City and was awarded during the Kannawidan Ylocos Festival in Ilocos Sur.

Salcedo Philippine Nationhood Trail historical marker within the town plaza, with the St. Joseph the Husband of Mary Parish Church in the background

== Government ==
=== Local government ===
Salcedo, belonging to the second congressional district of the province of Ilocos Sur, is governed by a mayor designated as its local chief executive and by a municipal council as its legislative body in accordance with the Local Government Code. The mayor, vice mayor, and the councilors are elected directly by the people through an election which is being held every three years.

=== Elected officials ===
Members of the Municipal Council (2025–2028)
Position	Name
Congressman	Kristine Singson-Meehan
Mayor	Grazielle G. Itchon
Vice-Mayor	Louie F. Gironella
Councilors	Mario P. Lazan
Councilors	Dominador V. Bang-asan
Councilors	Pedro P. Aswegi Jr.
Councilors	Gerlie S. Garrido
Councilors	Ruel B. Ronquillo
Councilors	Francisca F. Francia
Councilors	Larry A. Del Rosario
Councilors	Charlie S. Nang

== Education ==
The Salcedo-Galimuyod-Sigay-Del Pilar Schools District Office governs all private and public schools within the municipality of Salcedo. The Schools District Office (SDO) also oversees the operations of all schools situated in Galimuyod, Sigay, and Gregorio del Pilar.

=== Primary and elementary schools ===
- Arangin-Dinaratan Elementary School
- Baluarte Elementary School
- Baybayading Primary School
- Boguibog Elementary School
- Bulala-Leguey Primary School
- Culiong Elementary School
- Kinayad Elementary School
- Kinmarin Primary School
- Lucbuban Primary School
- Madarang Elementary School
- Parabur Baptist School Inc
- Pias Elementary School
- Salcedo Central School
- San Gaspar Primary School
- Sorioan Elementary School
- Ubbog Primary School
- Victory Elementary School

=== Secondary schools ===
- Dinaratan National High School
- Salcedo National High School

== See also ==
- List of renamed cities and municipalities in the Philippines
