= Universal Robina =

Philippine food and beverage company

Universal Robina Corporation
- Logo used since 2016
- Trade name: Universal Robina
- Formerly: Universal Corn Products, Inc. (1954–1966)
- Type: Public
- Traded as: PSE: URC
- Industry: Manufacturing
- Predecessor: Consolidated Foods Corporation (1961–1974) / CFC Corporation (1974–2010)
- Founded: September 28, 1954; 71 years ago
- Founder: John Gokongwei Jr.
- Headquarters: 6/F Tera Tower, Bridgetowne, E. Rodriguez, Jr. Avenue, Barangay Ugong Norte, Quezon City, Metro Manila, Philippines
- Area served: Asia
- Key people: Lance Y. Gokongwei (Chairman); Irwin C. Lee (President and CEO)
- Products: Confectionery, snack foods, grocery and convenience foods, beverages, animal feeds and other agriculture-based products
- Revenue: ▲ ₱2.9 billion (2022)
- Operating income: ▲ ₱4.0 billion (2022)
- Net income: ▼ ₱−13.4 billion (2022)
- AUM: ▲ ₱64.8 billion (2020)
- Total assets: ▲ ₱168.7 billion (2020)
- Total equity: ▲ ₱95.2 billion (2020)
- Number of employees: 13,171 (2024)
- Parent: JG Summit Holdings
- Subsidiaries: Danone Universal Robina Beverages (Note: Joint venture with Danone S.A.); Munchy's; Nissin-Universal Robina Corporation (Note: Joint venture with Nissin Foods Holdings Co., Ltd.); URC China; URC Hong Kong; URC Indonesia; URC Malaysia; URC Myanmar; URC Singapore; URC Thailand; URC Vietnam; Vitasoy-URC, Inc. (Note: Joint venture with Vitasoy International Holdings Ltd.)
- Website: urc.com.ph

Former logo used from 1989 until 2016.

Universal Robina Corporation, abbreviated as URC and also known as Universal Robina, is a Philippine company headquartered in Quezon City. It is one of the largest food and beverage companies in the Philippines, along with San Miguel Corporation, Monde Nissin, Mondelez Philippines and Nestlé Philippines.

URC is a core subsidiary of JG Summit Holdings, Inc. (JGSHI) which is one of the largest business conglomerates listed in the Philippine Stock Exchange.

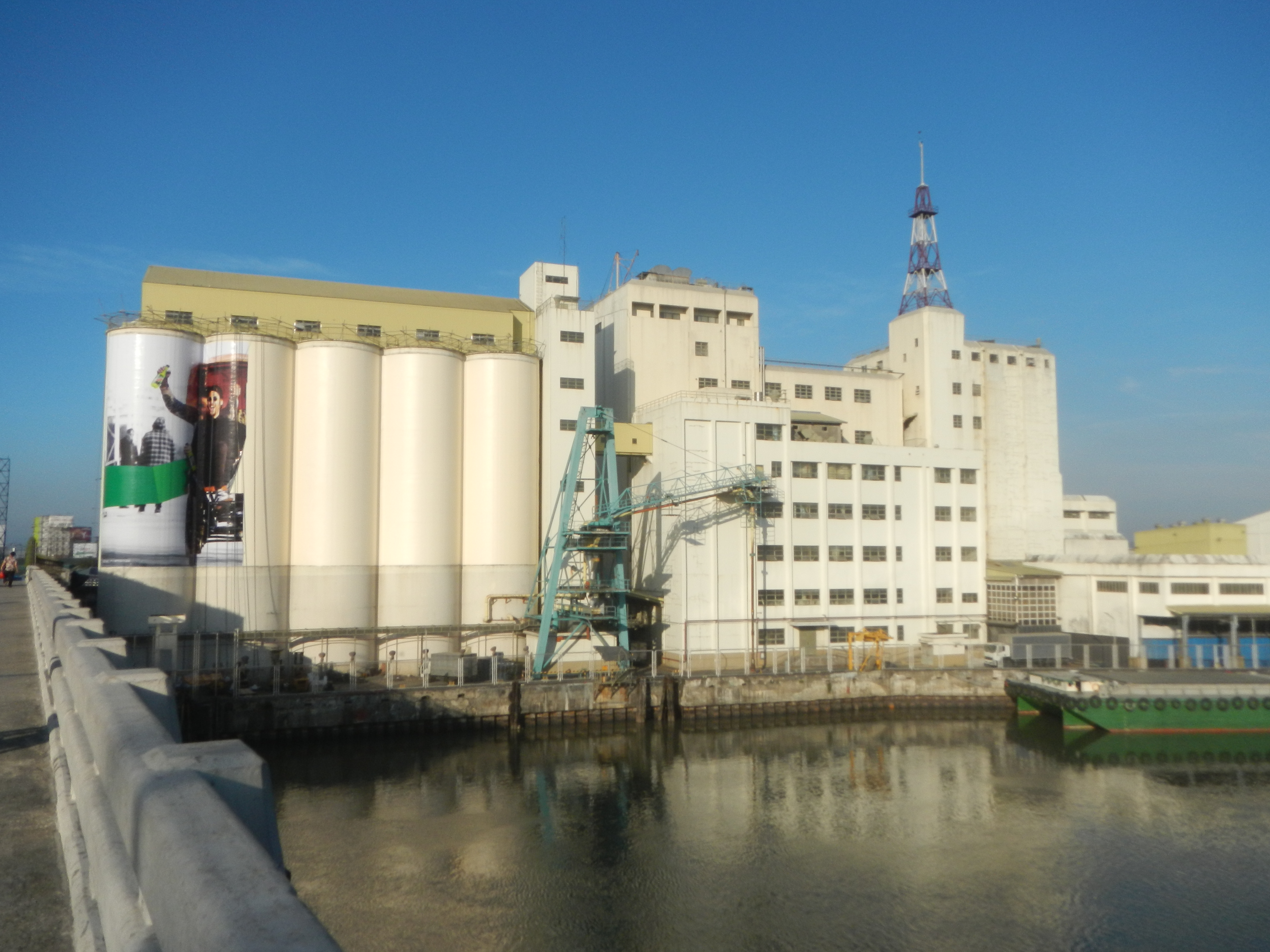
Pasig

== History ==
The company was founded on September 28, 1954 by John Gokongwei, Jr. under the name Universal Corn Products (UCP) after Gokongwei decided to construct a corn milling plant to produce glucose and cornstarch.

In 1961, Consolidated Food Corporation (later known as CFC Corporation) was established. The company's first product was Blend 45 instant coffee. It became one of the best-selling instant coffee brands in the local market, beating Café Puro and Nescafé at that time. After the success of Blend 45, the company launched the Presto brand to enter the chocolate segment in the late 1960s with its cocoa powder, powdered chocolate drink and confectionery. It later launched Nips, a brand of chocolate candies similar to M&M's. It became a staple among Filipino children.

In 1963, Robina Farms started their operations with poultry products. This marked the beginning of the vertical integration of the Gokongwei businesses, as the farms would be able to purchase feeds from UCP in the future. In the same decade, Robichem Laboratories was established for the veterinary needs of the farms' businesses. In the 1970s, Robina Farms expanded their operations as they entered the piggery business.

In 2014, URC announced a joint venture with Danone for a beverage production and distribution business in the Philippines. In the same year, URC established a joint venture with Calbee to establish local manufacturing for Calbee products. The joint venture was later terminated in 2018 upon Calbee selling its shares to URC. That same year, URC expanded to Oceania by acquiring New Zealand-based biscuit company, Griffin's Foods. This was followed by the acquisition of Snack Brands Australia in 2016. In December 2019, URC and German company Intersnack formed Unisnack ANZ, a joint venture comprising Griffin's Foods and Snack Brands Australia. Intersnack held a 40% stake in the consolidated business. However, URC would exit the venture in August 2021 by selling its stake in Unisnack ANZ to Intersnack.

In November 2021, URC entered an agreement to purchase Malaysia-based Munchy's from CVC Capital Partners for US$454 million.

== Presence ==
URC is based in Quezon City and as of 2018 has 19 production sites in the Philippines. It also has production sites in China, Myanmar, Thailand, Vietnam, Indonesia and Malaysia. The company also maintains an exclusive distributor presence in Laos and Cambodia, as well as sales offices in Hong Kong and Singapore.

== Sports ==
URC owned the Philippine Basketball Association franchise Great Taste Coffee Makers which played from the inaugural 1975 season to 1992 when the company sold the team to Sta. Lucia Realty. The Coffee Makers won six PBA championships.

== See also ==
- John Gokongwei
- JG Summit Holdings
- Robinsons Malls
