= Sports marketing =

Marketing strategy for sporting products

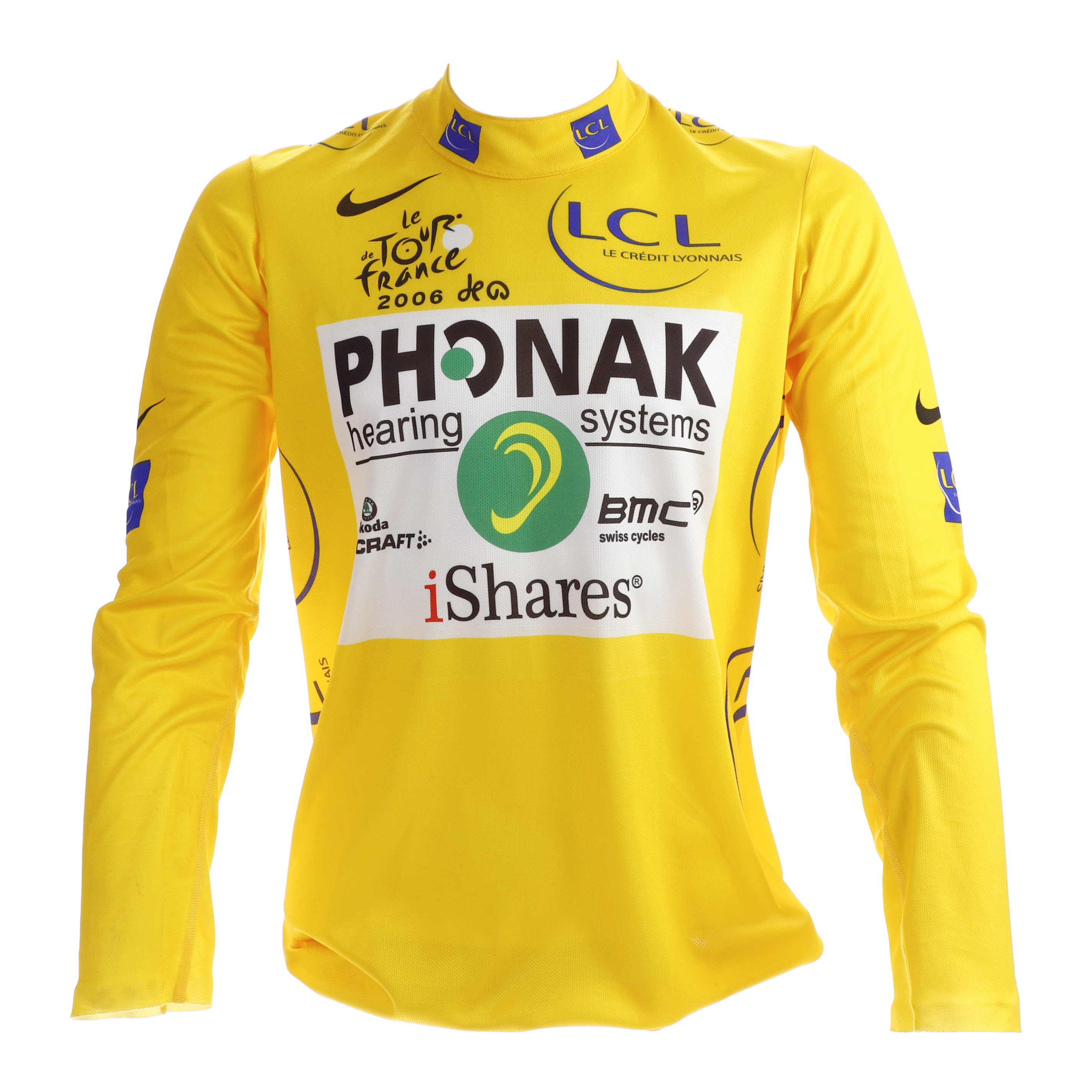
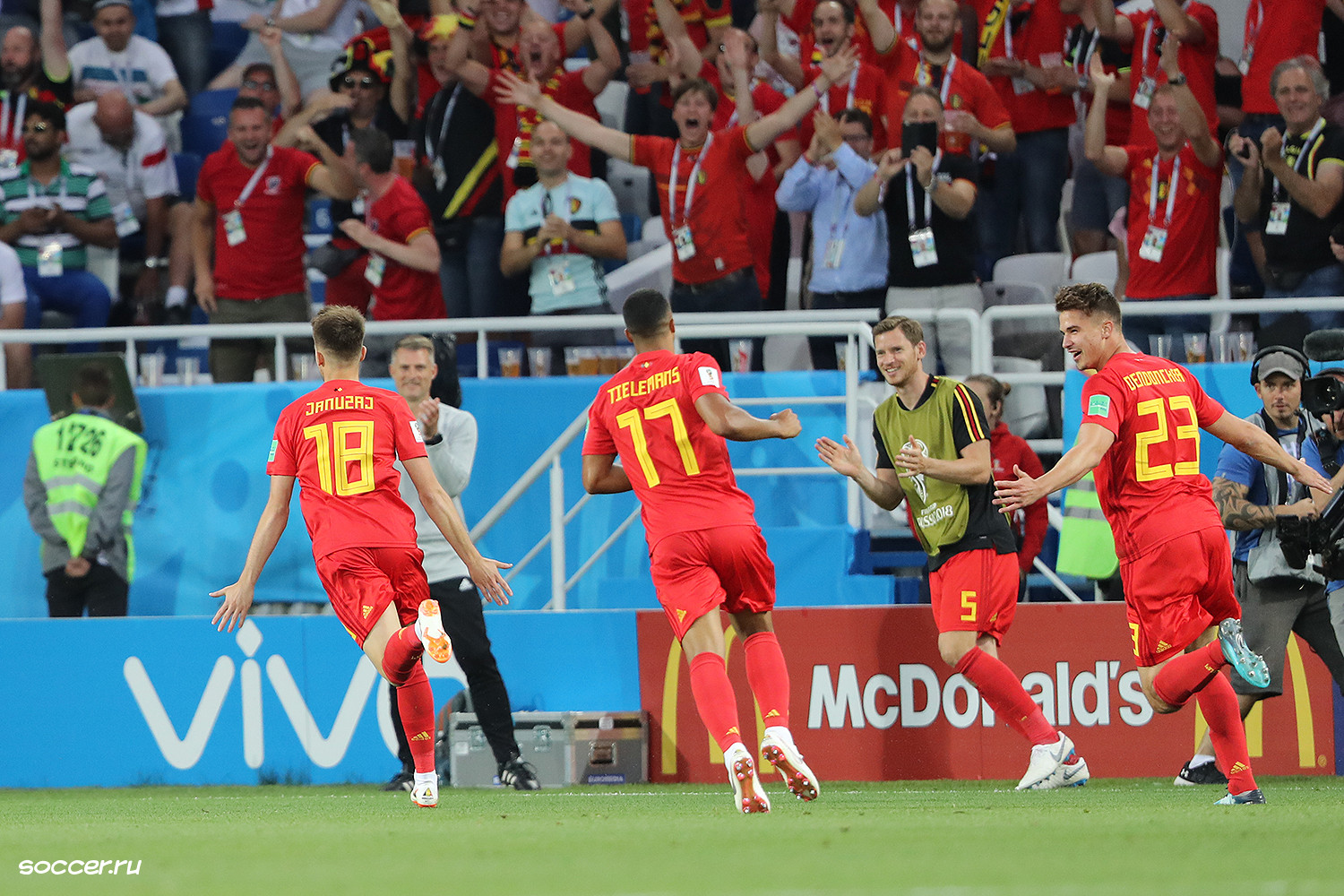
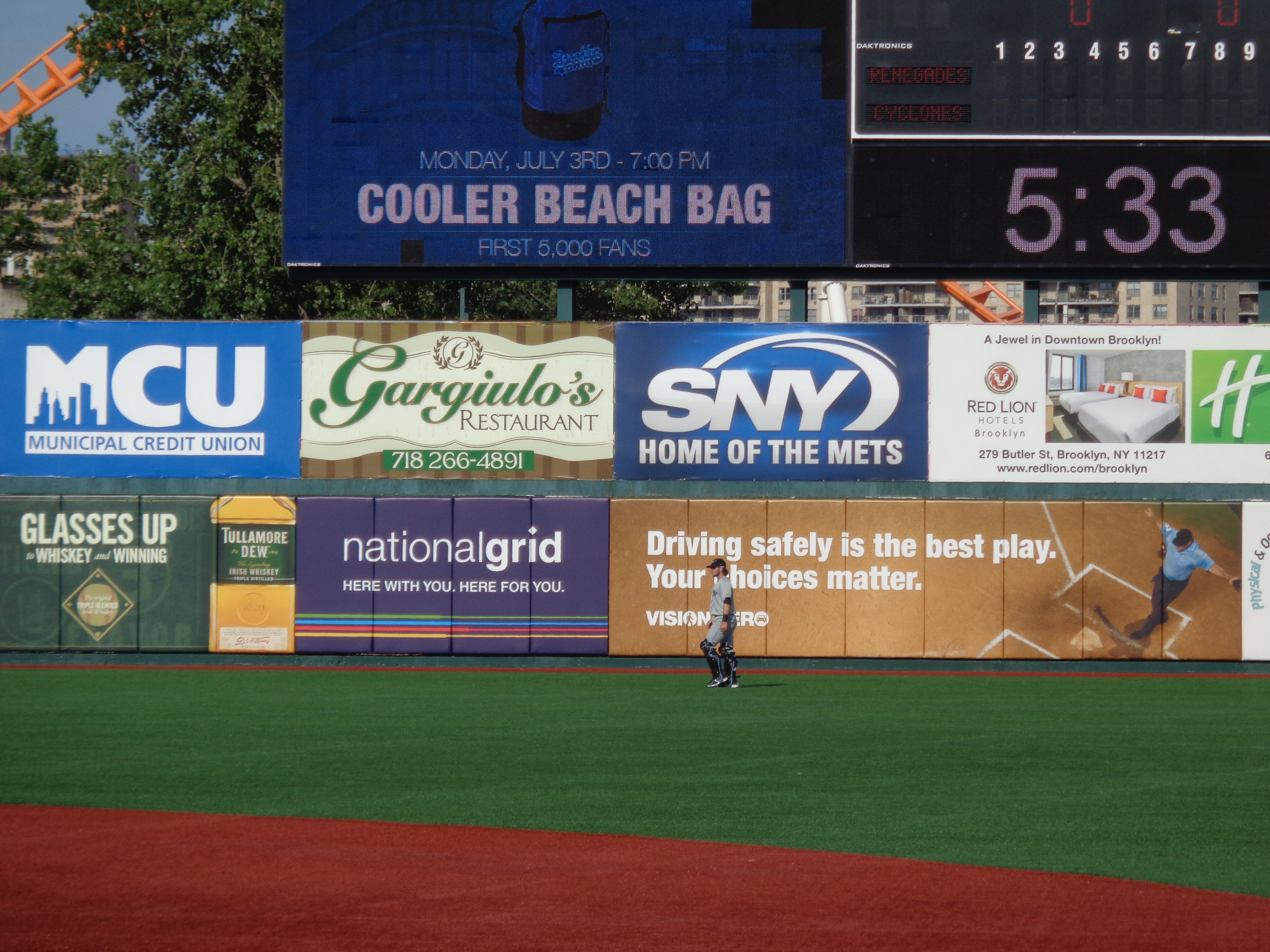
Corporations market their products through brand logo advertisements on (from left to right, top to bottom) a cycling jersey, the sidelines on an association football pitch, the boards of an ice hockey rink, and the outfield fence of a baseball park.

Sports marketing as a concept has established itself as a branch of marketing over the past few decades; however, a generally accepted definition does not exist. Academicians Kaser and Oelkers (2005, p. 9) define sports marketing as 'using sports to market products'. It is a specific application of marketing principles and processes to sport products and to the marketing of non- sports products through association with sport.

Sports Marketing is a subdivision of marketing which focuses both on the promotion of sports events and teams as well as the promotion of other products and services through sporting events and sports teams focused on customer-fans. It is a service in which the element promoted can be a physical product or a brand name. The goal is to provide the client with strategies to promote sports or to promote some other product, service, business or cause through sports. Sports marketing is also designed to meet the needs and wants of the consumers through exchange processes. These strategies follow the traditional four "P"'s of general marketing: Product, Price, Promotion and Place. Another four "P"’s are added to sports marketing, relating to the fact sports are considered to be a service. The additional 4 P’s are: Planning, Packaging, Positioning and Perception. The addition of the four extra elements is called the "sports marketing mix."

Sports marketing is an element of sports promotion which involves a wide variety of sectors of the sports industry, including broadcasting, advertising, social media, digital platforms, ticket sales, and community relations. Sports marketing is divided into three sectors. The first is the advertising of sport and sports associations such as the Olympics, Spanish Football league, NFL and the IPL, as well as sport teams like Mumbai Indians, Chennai Super Kings, Real Madrid and the New York Yankees. The second concerns the use of sporting events, sporting teams and individual athletes to promote various products. The third category is the promotion of sports to the public in order to increase participation.

In the first case, the promotion is directly related to sports. In the second case, the products can but do not have to be directly related to sports. When the promotion is about sports in general, the use of this kind of strategy is called “Marketing of Sports”. When the promotion is not about the sports but sports events, athletes, teams or leagues are used to promote different products, the marketing strategy is denominated “Marketing through sports." When the promotion is about increasing participation among the public, it is called "Grassroots Sports Marketing." To promote the products or services, the companies and associations use different channels such as sponsorships of teams or athletes, television or radio advertisement during the different broadcast sports events and celebrations, and/or advertisement on sporting venues.

Street marketing of sports considers sports marketing through billboards on the street and also through urban elements (street lighters and sidewalks, etc.) to help promote and gain publicity during major worldwide sporting events such as the Football World Cup, the Olympic Games, the Cricket World Cup or the Super Bowl.

== Sports fans ==
Like all business sectors, sports businesses also rely on market segmentation to effectively market themselves. Sport fans differ according to a number of attributes including motivations to attend sporting events, emotional attachment, economic attachment, identity, and loyalty. These attributes also make sports different from other forms of entertainment as sport fans behave differently than consumers of other products and services.

Attributes such as loyalty can be recognized through the contracts players and athletes sign with sports companies, in which they get paid to wear or use their products in each game or sporting event. By doing so, the players and athletes and also their fans develop a loyalty for the products for a longer time.

== Types of sports ==
With such an array of differences of sports fans, different types and levels of sports are found across the globe. For example, in many countries cricket and association football are extremely popular. In the United States, American football, baseball, and basketball are most favored, while college sports are also preferred. In addition to the classification of sports by levels, sports have also been classified as either mainstream or non-mainstream, also known as niche.

There are seven product attributes that differentiate mainstream sports from non-mainstream sports: accessibility, popularity, uniqueness, affordability, star power, player skill, and player similarity. Accessibility, affordability, and similarity are strongly related to niche sports while popularity, player skill as well as accessibility are strongly related to mainstream sports. Meanwhile, fans that are less-identified with a team are drawn to player similarity as they feel they can relate more with players while highly identified fans prefer the star power of players. Affordability also is a distinguishing factor among fans, as less-identified fans place greater importance on price. A practical marketing example of this is the National Lacrosse League mandating players to attend receptions of restaurants who sponsor the team. Other strategies that niche sports utilize to differentiate themselves from mainstream sports are providing easy access to team and player information, especially online, as well as offer affordable ticket prices and valuable promotions such as dollar beer nights and 25-cent hot dog nights. In contrast, popular mainstream sports like Major League Baseball (MLB) and the National Basketball Association (NBA) highlight the star power of players, which is why teams go to great effort to promote their best players. This is also seen in media as nationally televised sporting events often promote specific players leading up to games.

Fans also hold different expectations of different sport types and levels of sports. This is essential for sport marketers to understand. For example, fans attending a minor league baseball game will compare their experience to previous games attended at minor league baseball games, or even other minor league sports if they have little experience with minor league baseball. They will not, however, compare a minor league baseball experience to an NFL game as they understand the two experiences will be very different.

Sports differentiation is also important concerning sponsorship. Companies who sponsor niche sports place the most importance on attributes including cost effectiveness, spectator demographics, and the company fit with the sports image. Niche sports often allow companies who cannot afford to sponsor mainstream sports a channel to market their companies. Also, with niche sports shown to attract a different type of consumer, these companies desire to increase their public awareness within a specific target market. Other attributes important to companies sponsoring niche sports are enhancing both their image and community involvement.

== Benefits ==
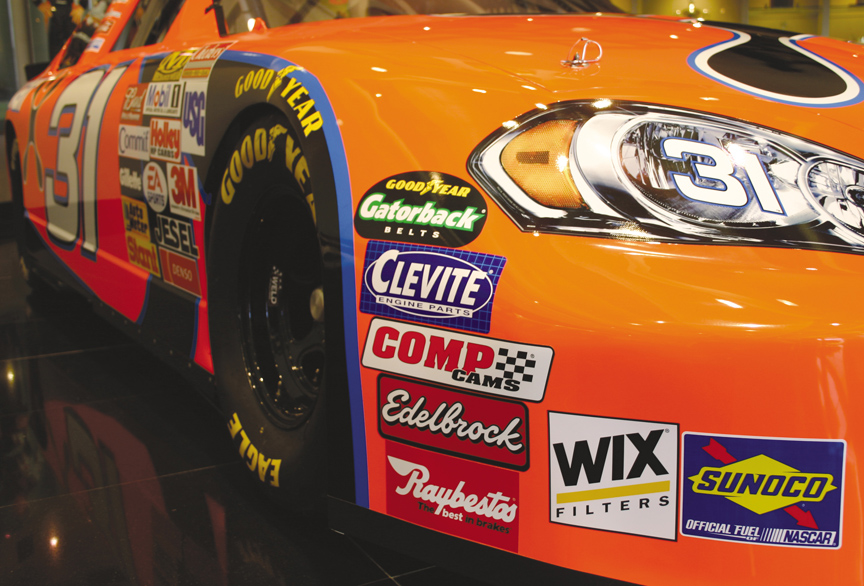
Stickers on a NASCAR race car from companies with large advertising contracts

The benefits of sports marketing are wide-ranging. Stakeholders involved in sports include leagues, teams, athletes, and fans as well as cities and countries hosting sporting events. The media and businesses who promote their products and services through sports also receive benefits. Direct benefits to leagues, teams, and athletes include revenue from tickets, media rights, and sponsorships. Cities and countries also receive revenue from taxes, and all of the stakeholders gain from the exposure provided through sports.

Sports sponsorship activation is often used by brands to increase visibility and brand awareness. Additionally, it also provides opportunities for companies to engage with target audiences and strengthen relationships with consumers. It also helps offer commercial benefits through increased exposure and fan engagement. When it comes to B2B, sponsorships are also used for corporate hospitality purposes, such as hosting clients at sporting events, providing premium viewing access, and facilitating networking opportunities in informal settings rather than in an office.

== New challenges for sports marketing ==
The role of traditional media and sports marketing is changing with millennials switching to new platforms to access sport. Inflexible contracts can leave little budget for marketing spend, and with fans choosing rival unofficial channels for insider content and insider information, the rewards can be hard won for organizations. New and accessible ways to view sports, from mobile to social to VR, mean there is less incentive for fans to attend events in person, while more expectation is placed on sports stars to pull off an authentic natural voice for their brands. The environment is challenging for small college athletics (e.g., NCAA Division III schools), who rely on fan attendance for revenue generation to keep their sports afloat, requiring communicators and marketers to become more creative in the ways they promote sports to their target audiences.

== Marketing of sports teams and events ==
According to different authors and organizations, the marketing of sports events and teams is defined as “Designing or developing a 'live' themed activity, occasion, display, or exhibit a sporting event to promote a product, a team, cause, or organization". In other words it can be defined as follows: The marketing of sports events and teams is the marketing strategy which is designed or developed for a “live” activity, which has a specific theme. Mostly this kind of strategy is used as a way to promote, display or exhibit different things, such as a sports team, a sport association among others. There are different events that can clearly exemplify this concept, such as the Super Bowl, the Olympic Games, the UEFA Champions League, the World Marathon Majors, and the FIFA World Cup.

Major sportswear companies compete to associate themselves with leading international marathons, often regarded as benchmarks of excellence in distance running, and for a genuine showcase for strengthening its marketing strategy to its target audience. Brands like Adidas, Asics and Nike play significant roles in dividing the market into the ‘World Marathon Majors’, an international competition established in 2006 that brings together some of the most prestigious marathonsworldwide. Although these companies typically serve as technical rather than title sponsors, such events remain central to their marketing strategies, often accompanied with dedicated advertising campaigns. These marathons are notable for attracting both elite and amateur runners competing within the same event.

The Super Bowl is an example of this concept because it is a massive sports event organized by a sport association, the NFL, which looks to promote the event, the sport, and as well the different football teams. The event is promoted through local and national media, and has also spread internationally. For example, in Mexico the NFL signed a contract with Cinemex, a Mexican movie theater chain, for the right to transmit its games in movie theaters. This displays the potential of sporting leagues and teams to promote not just the event, but the league and teams involved to a worldwide audience.

== Marketing products through sports ==
"Marketing through sports" is a concept that's been used since the 1980s, but has increased in importance in the last two decades due to the growth and expansion that the different types of sports have enjoyed since then. It is a marketing strategy that can be used in sports in two different ways. First, the use of marketing and promotion can be carried out through the sport or through the sports club. In the first case, the use of marketing is under responsibility of the different sporting associations, while in the second case, the responsibility falls on the different sports clubs. In this manner, marketing and promotion through sports and through the club involve sponsorship, corporate events and boxes, licensed merchandise, names and images also known as "endorsement", advertising through broadcaster, advertising such as advertising as ground signage/clothing/equipment advertising, promoting games, promoting using players/club/league or developing business opportunities. The peculiarity of sports is that "sports is the only entertainment where, no matter how many times you go back, you never know the ending." This singular fact is used by marketing companies as an advantage: every time the audience attends an event it will see the advertisements again and again, providing a wide range of opportunities for the different companies which operate in this field.

=== Examples ===
==== Sponsorship of events ====
One of the oldest examples of the marketing of products through sports is Slazenger's supply of the official ball of Wimbledon (1902–2015). Another international example of marketing products through sport is Adidas' sponsorship of FIFA, which includes the company supplying the balls used in the World Cup and having its logo on the side boards along the play-field. In what it described as a "world first" in corporate sports sponsorship, in 2016 BNY Mellon and Newton Investment Management announced they had donated their title sponsorship of the annual Oxford and Cambridge Boat Races to Cancer Research UK.

==== Sponsorship of teams ====
Sponsorship of teams is found throughout sports. Some of the most visible examples are found in the MLS as company names and logos are featured on team jerseys. For example, Alaska Airlines is the official jersey sponsor of the Portland Timbers while Valspar is the official sponsor of the Chicago Fire FC. These are examples of sponsorships of companies that are not related to sports.

Turkish Airlines established a sports marketing strategy involving high-profile sports teams, players, and sport associations including Manchester United, FC Barcelona, the Euroleague Basketball competition, NBA player Kobe Bryant, the Turkey national football team, and tennis player Caroline Wozniacki.

Another example of sports marketing through sponsorships of teams is the apparel contracts seen throughout sports. In 2011 Nike agreed to become the official apparel company of the NFL in exchange for around $220 million per year, a deal that has been extended through 2019.

At the college level, Ohio State and Nike maintain a contract that provides the school a value of $16.8 million per year in cash and product through the 2033-34 academic year. Michigan meanwhile receives a total value of $15.3 million per year. Under Armour and Adidas are also major apparel brands as Under Armour sponsors Notre Dame for $9 million per year while Adidas provides more than $7 million each year to both UCLA and Louisville.

These are examples of sports marketing because as it is defined, sports marketing is a marketing strategy in which companies related to sports products or services promote their trademark through design, production or other resources. In this case apparel companies Nike, Under Armour, and Adidas, which are all completely related to sports, design the uniforms of these teams and in this way, promote their trademarks every time there is an event.

In the Philippines, sports teams are often owned by corporations with names and branding of the teams itself used to market products. This is true for all of the franchise teams of the Philippine Basketball Association.

==== Sponsorship of athletes ====
Apparel companies also sponsor professional athletes such as Kevin Durant who receives $30 million per year from Nike. Stephen Curry is speculated to receive even more money than Durant from his contract with Under Armour. Meanwhile, Puma pays sprinter Usain Bolt $10 million per year.

Many athletes maintain contracts with a variety of companies; some of them are related to sports and others that are not. Roger Federer holds agreements with Nike, Wilson, Rolex, Mercedes-Benz, and Gillette, worth a sum close to $60 million each year. LeBron James’ contracts with Nike, Beats by Dre, Coca-Cola, Kia, McDonald's, and Samsung accrue the NBA player more than $40 million per year. Peyton Manning meanwhile holds sponsorship agreements with companies including Buick, DirecTV, Gatorade, Nationwide and Papa John's worth in sum approximately $12 million per year. Fellow NFL quarterback Drew Brees earns $11 million each year from his contracts with Wrangler, Vicks, Verizon, Nike, and Microsoft. Former professional boxing three time world champion Julio César Chávez promoted Mexican airline TAESA (an airline of which he was a stock owner) and Mexican beer company Tecate by having their logo sewn on his pants during many of his bouts. Similarly, Floyd Mayweather Jr. promoted Hublot and Manny Pacquiao promoted Nike, Air Asia, Phoenix Petroleum, Cafe Puro, Monolite and others during their bout.

Another example of marketing through sports is the strategy used by Gillette to promote its personal hygiene products through representative figures of each sport on television during broadcast sports events. Gillette uses athletes such as tennis player Roger Federer, golfer Tiger Woods, and soccer player Thierry Henry. In the commercial these celebrities appear using the products of the company. This is done in order to promote these products to the fans of these celebrities and inspire them to use these products. It is a clear example of this concept, because the company using this marketing strategy is not related to sports at all, but through important sports personalities, its products are exposed to a larger target audience.

Nike and Gatorade also hold sponsorship agreements with top athletes. Included among Nike's clients are Federer, Woods, golfer Rory McIlroy and tennis player Rafael Nadal while Gatorade has deals with NBA star Dwyane Wade, Serena Williams, and Peyton and Eli Manning.

== Promotion of sports to increase sports participation ==
Grassroots sports marketing is a part of the field of marketing known as social marketing. This refers to marketing something that is of benefit to the public, and is normally done by government or charities rather than private sector organizations. It is normally done with a much smaller budget than marketing of sports teams and event or marketing of products through sports as it does not bring any direct financial benefit. Although this marketing normally drives people to clubs where they will pay to play sports, it still needs to be subsidized in order to be run. The money therefore comes from local councils with a remit to increase participation or from public health sector which wants to decrease the cost of healthcare.

Examples of the promotion of sports to increase participation is the United States Golf Association's initiatives to increase golf participation as well as MLB's One Baseball campaign, which attempts to unify baseball organizations at all levels with the overarching goal of increasing youth participation and consequently creating new fans.

== Relationship marketing in sports ==
Relationship marketing relates to customer retention and building long term successful relationship between a business and its customers by maximizing customer satisfaction. Sport businesses need to communicate and participate in discussion with their customers in order to create, sustain and improve relationships. Existing studies offer insightful information into relationship and the general consensus is that sports businesses can benefit from its use. In many situations, sports marketing affairs include some sort of relationship marketing, where clubs, organisations, fans and athletes have relationships with one another that are dependent on the successful management of those relationships. In order for sport businesses to be successful in their goals, they should view their customers as partners for life rather than here and now consumers, and attempt to understand their ever-evolving needs, desires, expectations and values. By doing so, sport businesses are able to maintain and enhance their fan base easily than through the more commonly used short-term transactions such as merchandise and ticket sales. Social media enables businesses to do this and connect with their customers with much higher efficiency and effectiveness.

Used as a global communication and interaction channel, social media has changed the conventional customer relationship dynamics. Social media is a tool that enables customers’ engagement through an instantaneous and active back-to-back conversation. Customers are increasingly incorporating social media into their daily lives and using it for communication. Businesses have also made it an integral part of their marketing mix. Today, sports businesses can use social media to actively analyse customer's needs and wants rather than use out-dated methods of data collection such as surveys and focus groups, which do not provide rich information to better understand customers. It allows sports businesses to keep their customers updated on the latest news and information as well as interact with them on an individual basis. This instantaneous two-way communication tool available to sports businesses allows them to provide quality content within short time frames and interact with customers in real time. Effective utilization of social media enables sports brands to provide their customers with the best possible experience and expand their competitive advantage in marketing.

The benefits of social media are mutual: Apart from sports businesses benefitting from the use of social media in the context of relationship management and marketing, the constant interaction between sport businesses and their customers allows organisations to know and learn about each individual customer on a deeper level. As a result of this, customers feel more valued and this leads to higher customer loyalty. Social media enables sport businesses to involve customers in the marketing process by receiving feedback and ideas, which can then be implemented in future products and services. By doing so, sport businesses strengthen the level of engagement and connection between the organisation and the customer, and this reinforces the importance that customers hold in the brand building process.

=== Teams and athletes marketing ===
Professional leagues, teams, and athletes have started using social media as a part of their marketing strategies during the recent years. The emphasis, however, is often still on the brands that are promoted by popular teams and sportsmen.

The most popular social media platforms are Facebook and Twitter, but athletes and teams are also using sites including Instagram and Snapchat for marketing. As in case of all businesses, the advantages of social media use in sports include building brand awareness, reaching a larger audience in an easy and cost-effective way as well as creating brand advocates and engaging passionate sports fans. There are numerous examples of athletes and sports teams using social media for marketing and promotions.

- For example, for a brand like Babolat, having a world icon like Rafael Nadal as its top brand representative is priceless. There is no better way to stand up to your competition than by having the best on your side. You must also know how to do it because not everything works in marketing. This is why knowing how to use social media is fundamentally important. “A message on Twitter is not just an advertising channel with which you can win an audience. Its power lies in the message being relevant and credible”, explains Edwin Schravesande (professor of e-marketing at the Johan Cruyff Academy of Tilburg).
- Baylor Bold Rewards Program: When fans decide to "like" or "follow" Baylor athletics on either Twitter or Facebook, they are given day-to-day updates on their favorite teams. From a marketing aspect, the Baylor athletics page on Facebook and Twitter keeps track of fans who have "tweeted" or "commented" on certain links, posts, or tweets. There is an incentive for these fans to post and tweet because at the end of each year, the top three posting or tweeting fans are selected to receive grand prizes including free jerseys and merchandise to season tickets.
- Michigan Presale Incentive: Michigan used a very clever way to increase the total amount of "likes" or "followers" for their Facebook and Twitter Pages in order to find higher recognition. In order to have the opportunity to apply for pre-sale tickets for their Michigan football games, at the largest football arena in the nation 'The Big House,' fans are required to "follow" or "like" their page on Facebook or Twitter. This allows them to be able to purchase pre-sale tickets for any game that they desire, making this method of marketing a great tool for gaining awareness for their team and many other things.
- Louisville Slugger Scavenger Hunt: After the St. Louis Cardinals won the World Series in 2011, Hillerich & Bradsby, makers of Louisville Slugger bats and other baseball equipment, created a scavenger hunt through Twitter in order to raise awareness for their company. The hunt involved 45 world series commemorative bats, scattered all over the city of St. Louis, Missouri. The Louisville Slugger Twitter page posted "tweets" that hinted at where the bats were located within the city. The fan or participants used their mobile phones in order to remain up to date on the specific "tweets" referring to the hunt. If a fan or participant found one of the several bats, the participant was told that they were to be kept by the seeker. The reason this company held a scavenger hunt was to find recognition and to increase their number of followers on Twitter. The statistics shows that their fan base skyrocketed, lifting the number of Facebook likes by 143%, number of people talking about the brand on Facebook by 834% and its number of Tweeter followers by 161%.

Many teams have incorporated sponsorships into their social media strategies, such as the Minnesota Vikings “Touchdown Tracker” Instagram image, which was sponsored by FedEx. The Cleveland Browns also displayed sponsorship integration in their tweets recapping touchdown drives, sponsored by Cooper Tires.

Many athletes including Kobe Bryant, Russell Wilson, and Rafael Nadal have taken advantage of social media to increase their followers and improve their brand recognition. Athletes have also promoted brands through social media including Russell Wilson's sponsorship of Recovery Water and Serena Williams’ promotion of Wheels Up.
