= Malagos Garden Resort =

Agri-ecotourism site in Davao City, Philippines

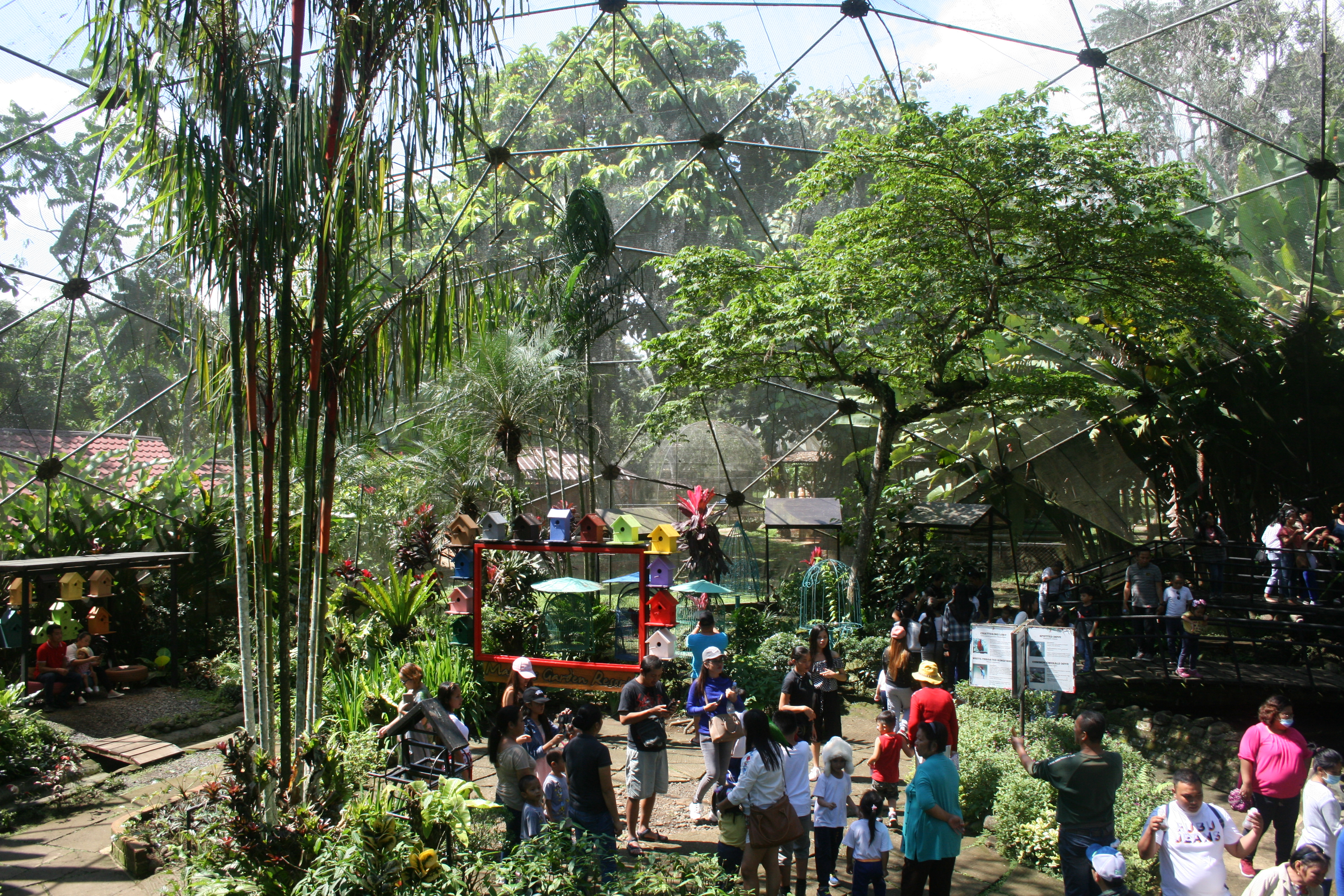
- Aviary
- Interactive map of Malagos Garden Resort
- Type: Agri-ecotourism site
- Location: Davao City
- Coordinates: 7°11′28″N 125°25′41″E
- Opened: 1994
- Designation: Farm tourism site (Department of Tourism)
- Website: www.malagos.com

The Malagos Garden Resort is an agri-ecotourism site in Davao City, Philippines.

== History ==
The Malagos Garden Resort which opened in 1994, is owned by the Puentespina family which introduced chocolate making in Davao City in 2012 through Malagos Chocolate.

The first chocolate museum in the Philippines was opened within the resort in November 2016.

In June 2018, the Malagos Chocolate Spa opened within the resort, which uses cacao husks, a byproduct of chocolate making, produced by the garden resort.

The garden resort stopped admitting tourists in mid-March 2020 due to the onset of the COVID-19 pandemic. The facility's farming operations continued.

== Facilities and attractions ==
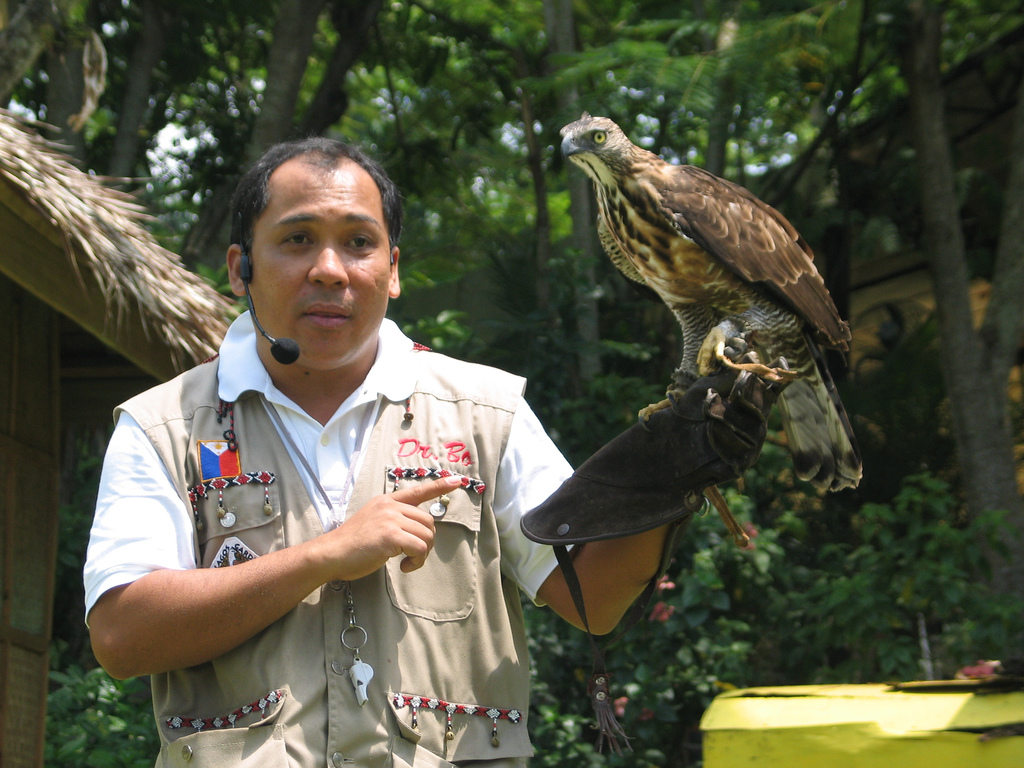
Dr. Bo with a Philippine hawk-eagle.

The Malagos Garden Resort covers an area of 12 hectares (30 acres) for ecotourism activities. It is accredited as a farm tourism site by the government's Department of Tourism. It is known for its Chocolate Museum, orchid farm, and chocolate spa. It also hosts a bird feeding dome, butterfly sanctuary and museum, a playground, a skate park, and a moonlight theater. A long-time attraction is the Malagos Bird Show which was hosted by Bo Puentespina which was held on weekends from the early 2000s to 2019. It operates a 70 hectares (170 acres) cacao farm.
