= Comfoods =

Philippine food and beverage company

Commonwealth Foods, Inc.
- Trade name: Comfoods
- Company type: Private
- Industry: Food and drink
- Founded: 1951; 75 years ago
- Founder: James Huang
- Headquarters: Comfoods Building, Makati, Metro Manila, Philippines
- Products: Instant and ground roasted coffee, chocolate, cookies, crackers
- Brands: Café Puro; Ricoa; Fibisco

Commonwealth Foods, Inc., simply known as Comfoods, is a Philippine food and beverage company based in Makati.

== History ==
Commonwealth Foods, Inc. (Comfoods) was established in the Philippines in 1951 by James Huang, a Chinese Filipino who was born in Amoy, Fukien, (now Xiamen). Huang established Comfoods with the help of New York-based coffee trader DeWitt Dyckman. In 1952, a factory was established in Makati where coffee was roasted and packaged under the Café Puro and Café Excelente brands. In 1955, the company introduced Café Bueno, the first soluble coffee in the Philippine market. By the late 1950s, Café Puro became the second most popular coffee brand in the country next to Nestlé. Huang also established Philippine Food Industries (Philfoods) in 1953 and Filipinas Biscuit Corporation (Fibisco) in 1959. Both companies were merged with Comfoods in 1968.

Comfoods expanded to British Hong Kong in 1960 with the establishment of a subsidiary and a factory. In August 1962, the company began promoting Café Puro to Singapore and Malaya through a deal with Guthrie & Company. Comfoods would later cease operations in Hong Kong, although the Comfoods subsidiary company still exists.

== Products ==
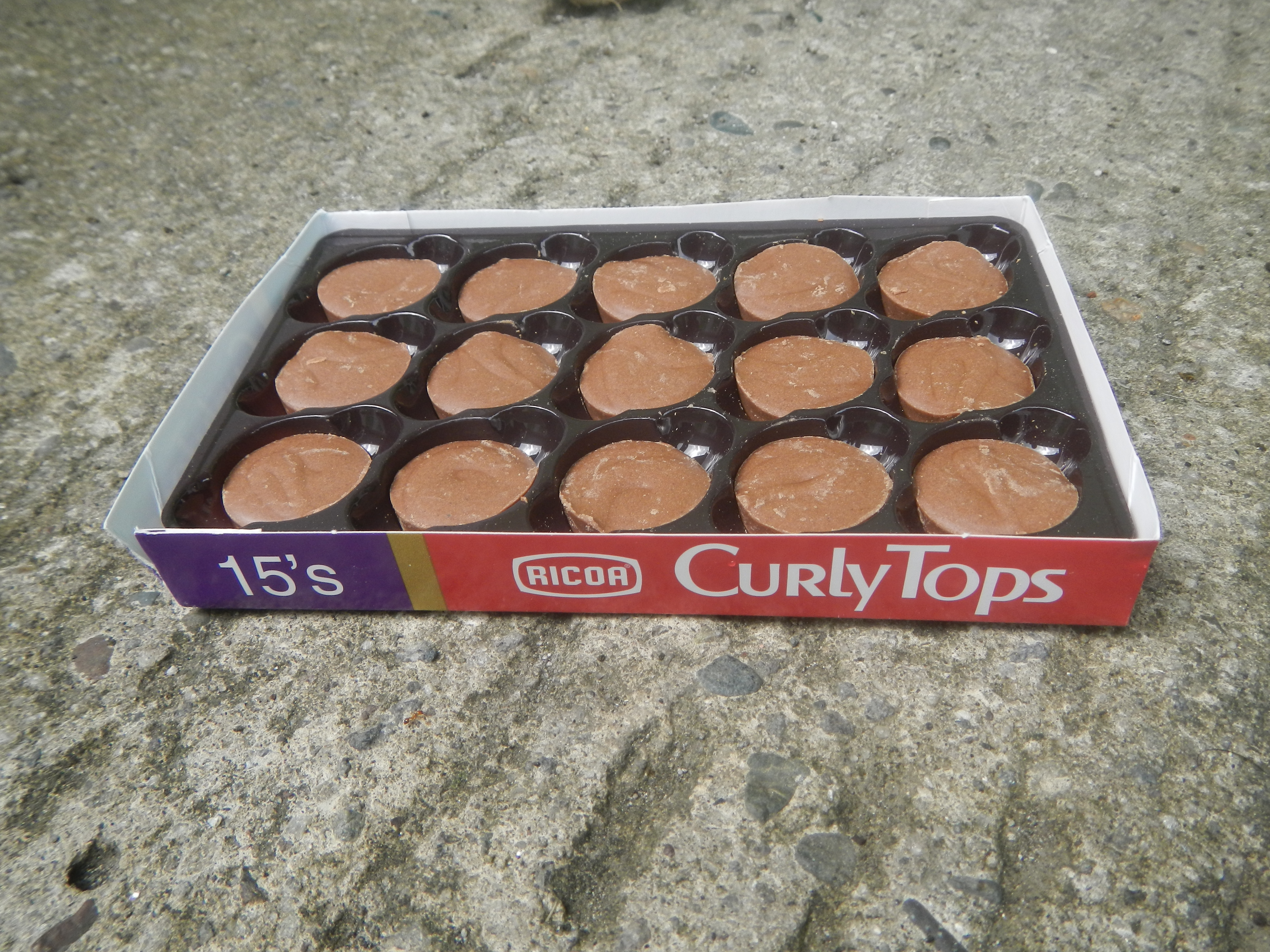
Curly Tops

Comfoods was established as a manufacturer and distributor of packaged roasted coffee under different brands such as Café Puro, Café Excelente, and Café Bueno.

The Ricoa division manufactures chocolate and chocolate-based products such as Ricoa cocoa powder and chocolate syrup, as well as chocolate candy brands, Flat Tops and Curly Tops.

The Fibisco division, produces cookies and crackers, including Choco Mallows - a chocolate-coated marshmallow biscuit.
