= Munchy's =

Malaysian snack food manufacturer

Munchy Food Industries Sdn Bhd
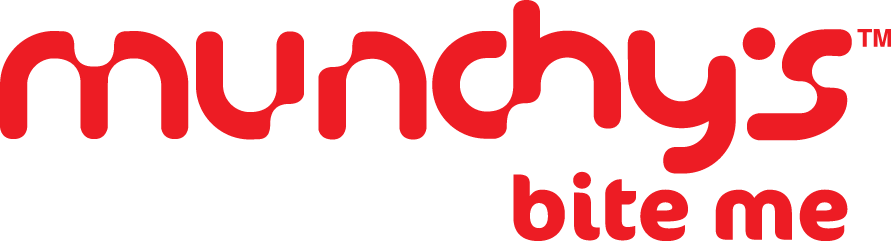
- Trade name: Munchy's
- Type: Subsidiary
- Industry: Food processing, snack
- Founded: 1991; 35 years ago in Batu Pahat, Johor, Malaysia
- Headquarters: Tongkang Pecah, Batu Pahat, Malaysia
- Area served: Global
- Key people: Cheang Kok Tan, Lee Kok Tan, Soo Kuok Tan and Net Tan
- Products: Biscuits, cookies
- Number of employees: 1,000+
- Parent: Universal Robina
- Website: www.munchys.com

Munchy Food Industries Sdn Bhd (doing business as Munchy's) is a Malaysia-based snack food manufacturer. Its group headquarters is in Batu Pahat and its corporate headquarters is in Klang. Munchy's has offices in Ipoh, Butterworth, Johor Bahru, Kota Bharu, Kuantan, Malacca City, Kota Kinabalu, Kuching and international offices in Singapore and Thailand. It exports its products to over 60 countries.

== History ==
=== Establishment ===
Munchy's started in 1991, in a small town in the South of Malaysia, Batu Pahat. The Munchy's origins started with the two brothers Soo Kuok Tan and Lee Kok Tan setting up Munchy Food Industries. With an initial investment of RM80,000 the brothers developed the company to its current state, with the involvement of their siblings, CK Tan and Net Tan.

Munchy's production capacity increased by the year as the brothers worked towards their goal to market Munchy's globally. The first destination for international expansion was South Africa. Subsequently, the brothers established a partnership with a reputable MNC chocolate company that allowed them to extend Munchy's product range to include chocolate wafers.

=== International expansion ===
In 1996, Munchy's factory was built in Johor, Malaysia, with 120,000 sq ft (11,000 m^{2}) of real estate and fully automated wafer technology. Considered the most advanced fully automatic wafer plant in South East Asia to date, three new products were revealed – Muzic Wafers, Munchini Wafer Rolls and Lexus Biscuits.

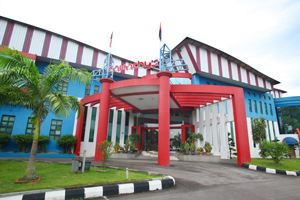
Munchy's Factory

Today, Munchy's owns a production plant and warehouse facility in Batu Pahat, Johor, Malaysia. The built-up area of these facilities amounts to more than 300,000 sq ft (28,000 m^{2}) and is outfitted with:

- 2 wafer plants with the capacity to manufacture up to 410 tons per month.
- 4 biscuit plants with production capacity up to 2,940 tons per month.
- 5 wafer stick machines with 20 production lines with production capacity up to 280 tons per month.

A 120,000 sq ft (11,000 m^{2}) warehouse was commissioned to be built. Munchy's had more recently adopted a new third-party logistics provider to enable its business to be executed with "Speed to Market" distribution.

All Munchy's products are manufactured solely under the brand name of Munchy's, with a record of 80 SKUs (Stock-Keeping Units) under their belt. The main product offerings for Munchy's are Krunch, Muzic, Munchy's, Lexus and Captain Munch.

1997 saw the introduction of MunchWorld Marketing Sdn Bhd, Munchy's marketing arm and sole distributor of Munchy's products. This entity was set up to spearhead Munchy's branding, marketing, advertising, events, promotions and distribution.

In 2018, CVC Capital Partners acquired 100% of Munchy's.

In 2021, Universal Robina of the Philippines acquired 100% of Munchy's for 1.925 billion Malaysian Ringgit from CVC Capital Partners.

== Operations ==
Munchy Food Industries Sdn Bhd remains the manufacturing and group headquarters for the Munchy's brand. Munchy's maintains branches in Ipoh, Butterworth, Johor Bahru, Kota Bharu, Kuantan, Malacca City, Kota Kinabalu, Kuching and international offices in Singapore, Thailand and Indonesia.

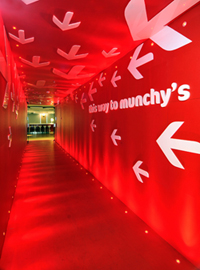
Munchy's Klang Office

MunchWorld Marketing Sdn Bhd, was established as Munchy's marketing arm and sole distributor of Munchy's products.

=== Product availability ===
- India
- Bangladesh
- Hong Kong
- Indonesia
- Iraq
- Libya
- Mauritius
- Nepal
- Singapore
- South Africa
- South Korea
- Thailand
- Brunei
- Taiwan
- Bahrain
- Mongolia
- Yemen
- Philippines
- Malaysia
- Saudi Arabia
- Morocco
- Lebanon
- Egypt
- Syria
- Tunisia
- United Kingdom
- China
- Vietnam

== Brands ==
- Captain Munch
- Oat Krunch
- Biskies
- Lexus
- Muzic
- Yosss
- Munchy's Wheat Crackers
- Munchy's Choc Sandwich
- Munchy's Funmix
- Munchy's Original Cream Crackers
- Munchy's Marie
- Munchy's Topmix
- Bear Brand
- Tae
- 7 Days
