= Malagos Chocolate =

Philippine chocolate company

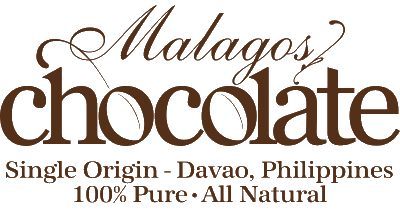
- Type: Private
- Industry: Food processing
- Founded: October 2012; 13 years ago
- Founders: Roberto and Charita Puentespina
- Headquarters: Davao City, Philippines
- Products: Confectionery cocoa liquor
- Website: malagoschocolate.com

Malagos Agri-Ventures Corporation (d.b.a. Malagos Chocolate) is a Philippine bean-to-bar chocolate manufacturer based in Davao City. Founders Roberto and Charita Puentespina leased cacao trees and made tablea with them. After collaborating with retailers, they partnered with the Mars Cocoa Development Center, where they learned practices pertaining to cacao. The company was commercially launched in June 2013 and had collaborations with Starbucks, The Tasting Club, AirAsia, Krispy Kreme, and other brands. They launched an international division in Canada in 2020. In 2017, a museum was founded by the brand that contained four sections, including an information area and a chocolate lab. Malagos has branches across the Philippines, with most of them in Davao.

The chocolates are made from cacao planted in farms in Davao City. The chocolate is then made into chocolate in a factory. As of 2024, they have 56 total international awards, especially for their dark chocolate and drinking chocolates. They received awards from the Academy of Chocolate; the International Chocolate Awards; the UK-based Guild of Fine Food; the Heirloom Cacao Preservation Fund; and the World Drinking Chocolate Competition. Malagos' beans were ranked top 50 worldwide.

== History ==
=== Origin and founding ===
The Malagos Agri-Ventures Corporation was founded by Charita and Roberto Puentespina in October 2012. The two had entered the cocoa industry in 2002, when they took on a lease of farmland in Malagos in the Baguio District of Davao City. Charita rehabilitated existing cacao trees on the property and began exporting the beans and using them to make tablea through a process of roasting over firewood, grinding, and molding. The final chocolate was described as having a silky taste. In December 2007, the cocoa sustainability team of Mars, Incorporated connected with the Puentespinas to establish the Mars Cocoa Development Center. Through this, the farm implemented other agricultural practices related to cacao, like how to properly process the beans. Around the 2010s, cacao exporters in Davao faced competition, causing Charita to travel to France with her daughter, where they attended the Salon du Chocolat trade show. Upon seeing the exhibits, Charita told her daughter she could do the same at home. They sold the products to a retailer in Singapore who distributed the beans worldwide. Originally, they distributed products domestically but changed to making chocolate bars when Sean Askinosie, the founder of the chocolate brand Askinosie Chocolate, came across them while looking to source cacao beans from Asia. The firm then began producing single-origin cocoa liquor. Malagos Chocolate was commercially launched in June 2013 and began producing other chocolate products.

=== Recent events ===
In May 2019, they sold their couverture chocolates at the International Food Exhibition of the Philippines. In mid-2019, the company held a partnership with food duo "The Tasting Club", a duo that utilized Zoom to give feedback related to food. The partnership paired Malagos Chocolate products with alcoholic beverages. In 2019, they released a recipe book titled the Malagos Book of Chocolates. In the COVID-19 pandemic, the company released advertising promoting their chocolates as fresh and opened an online store. Malagos is available in AirAsia flights through a partnership. They also collaborated with Krispy Kreme through a regional campaign, Max's Restaurant through a product named "Malagos Chocolate Cakes," which are made using their chocolates, and Honey Lemon, a milk-tea spot from Hong Kong, through two drinks with Malagos Chocolate.

Malagos Chocolate began exporting to Japan in 2016, and by April 2017 it was exporting to Thailand and Singapore. Of these, Malagos Sales and Marketing Head Rex Puentespina stated that Japan was the largest export market. Exports to Canada began in mid-2020 with an official branch opening shortly after.

== Products and services ==
Malagos 85% Dark Chocolate packaging and chocolate bar.

Malagos cultivates its own cacao at a Bureau of Plant Industry-certified cacao nursery at the foothills of Mount Talomo. They ferment, dry, sort, and roast the cacao beans they use in their production of chocolate. The farm is located at Barangay Baguio District, Davao City. The firm also buys beans from around 100 small-scale cocoa farmers in the Davao area and supplies cacao seeds, seedlings and scions throughout Mindanao. In October 2017, it was reported that Malagos Chocolate, along with other chocolate brands, would be participating in Salon du Chocolat on October 28 to November 1 in Paris, France. In 2017, the Puentespinas opened the first chocolate museum in the Garden Resort. Other than the museum, there are store branches in Metro Davao, and parts of Visayas and Mindanao.

The company has dark chocolates, including a 65% dark chocolate bar, an 85% bar, a 72% bar, and a 100% pure unsweetened chocolate. They also have a salted caramel chocolate bar and "cacao juices," which are made from the juice in cacao pods. According to Patricia Baes of Spot.ph, the juice is said to have a "sweet and tart flavor".

== Awards ==
They gained a total of 56 international awards as of February 2024 from the International Chocolate Awards and the Academy of Chocolate Awards, an increase from 28 in 2019. In April 2015, the Academy of Chocolate in London gave Malagos a bronze award for their 100% Unsweetened Chocolate. In 2015, the company received a silver award for its Malagos Dark Chocolate at the World Drinking Chocolate Competition by the International Chocolate Awards in Hannover, Germany. In 2016, the products gained a two-star accolade (Note: With three being the highest.) from the UK's Guild of Fine Food. In early 2015, they were awarded for their drinking chocolate in the Academy of Chocolate Awards, and earned another recognition in October (silver) in the International Chocolate Awards. Malagos garnered a bronze award each for its 62% dark chocolates and 72% dark chocolate bars in the 2017 edition of the awards. In 2017, their beans were the top 50 best worldwide. In May 2018, Malagos won five awards in the 10th Academy of Chocolate Awards in the United Kingdom. The brand gained awards at the 2019 International Chocolate Awards. In the 2019 Academy of Chocolate competition, Malagos received three bronze awards for the Filled Chocolate category. In October 2020, the company won four gold medals in the World Drinking Chocolate Competition held in Hannover, Germany, for their Plain Dark Drinking Chocolate. The company won three other awards in special categories, like Growing Country, Chocolate Maker, and Direct Traded. After the win, Trade Secretary Ramon Lopez congratulated the company, stating, "This is a validation of our nation’s never-ending quest for excellence in the field of cacao farming and chocolate-making."

== See also ==
- Malagos Garden Resort
- Chocolate industry in the Philippines
