= Café Puro =

Filipino coffee brand

- Product type: Coffee
- Current owner: Commonwealth Foods, Inc.
- Country: Philippines
- Introduced: 1952; 74 years ago
- Markets: Philippines
- Tagline: Sarap ng giniling na kape. (The delicious taste of ground coffee.)

Café Puro is a coffee brand in the Philippines owned by Commonwealth Foods, Inc. The brand was introduced in 1952, along with the company's several (now defunct) coffee brands—Café Bueno, Café Excellente and Lé Café—in ground and instant varieties.

== Sponsorships ==
Café Puro has sponsored many of Manny Pacquiao's boxing fights and was, along with Nike and Air Asia, one of the main sponsors of his fight with Floyd Mayweather Jr.
